= Licostinel =

Chemical compound

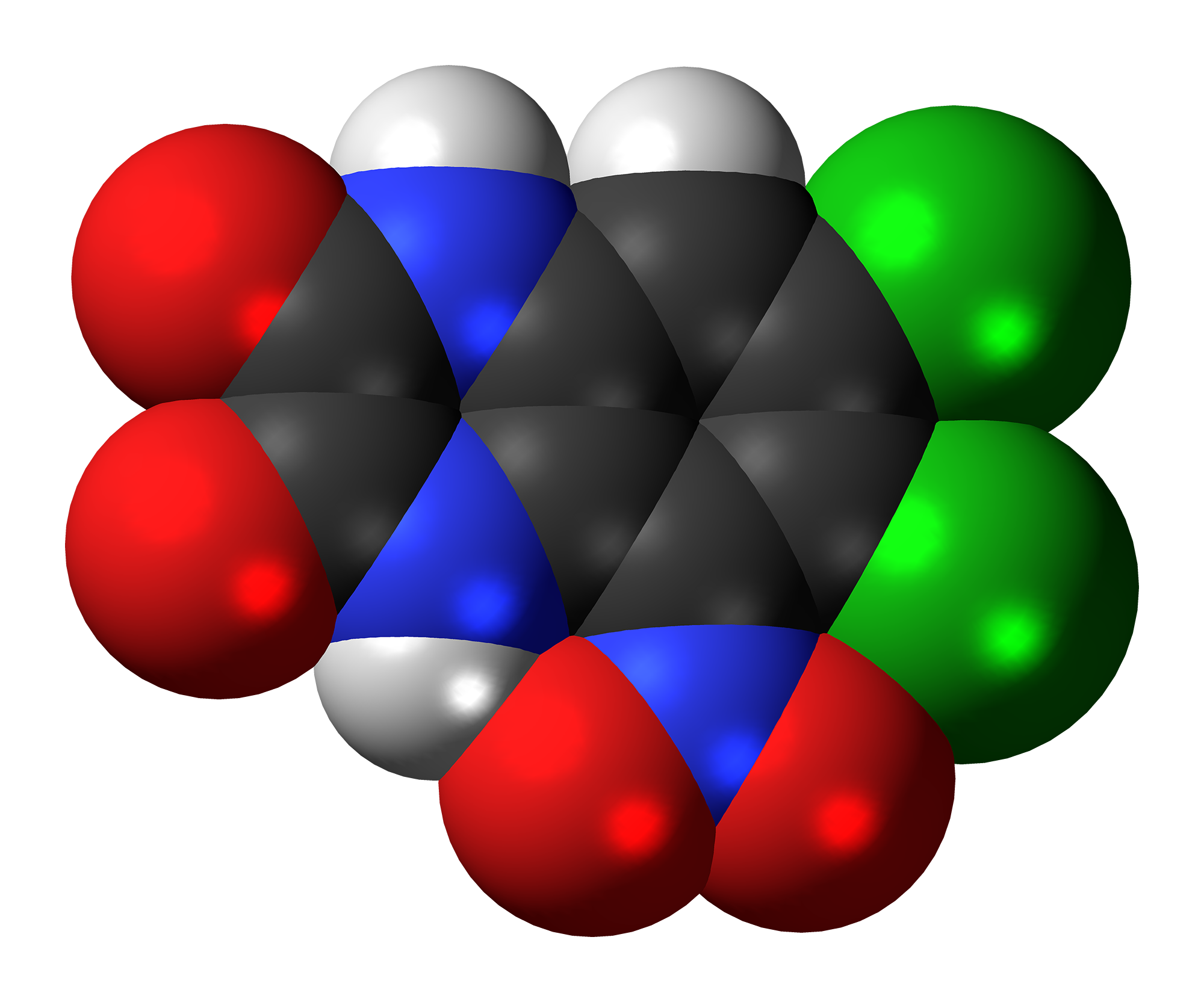

Clinical data
- Other names: ACEA-1021
- ATC code: None

Identifiers
- IUPAC name: 6,7-Dichloro-5-nitro-1,4-dihydro-2,3-quinoxalinedione
- CAS Number: 153504-81-5
- PubChem CID: 5486198
- ChemSpider: 4588899
- UNII: 3Z3037LJTC
- CompTox Dashboard (EPA): DTXSID60165346

Chemical and physical data
- Formula: C_{8}H_{3}Cl_{2}N_{3}O_{4}
- Molar mass: 276.03 g·mol^{−1}
- 3D model (JSmol): Interactive image
- SMILES: c1c2c(c(c(c1Cl)Cl)[N+](=O)[O-])[nH]c(=O)c(=O)[nH]2
- InChI: InChI=1S/C8H3Cl2N3O4/c9-2-1-3-5(6(4(2)10)13(16)17)12-8(15)7(14)11-3/h1H,(H,11,14)(H,12,15); Key:CHFSOFHQIZKQCR-UHFFFAOYSA-N

Licostinel (INN; development code ACEA-1021) is a competitive, silent antagonist of the glycine site of the NMDA receptor (K_{b} = 5 nM). It was under investigation by Acea Pharmaceuticals as a neuroprotective agent for the treatment of cerebral ischemia associated with stroke and head injuries but was ultimately never marketed. In clinical trials, licostinel did not produce phencyclidine-like psychotomimetic effects at the doses tested, though transient sedation, dizziness, and nausea were observed. In addition to its actions at the NMDA receptor, licostinel also acts as an antagonist of the AMPA and kainate receptors at high concentrations (K_{b} = 0.9 μM and 2.5 μM, respectively).

== See also ==
- Aptiganel
- Eliprodil
- Gavestinel
- Lubeluzole
- Selfotel
