= Nitromemantine =

Chemical compound

Clinical data
- Other names: NitroMemantine; NitroSynapsin; YQW-36; YQW36; EM-036; EM036;
- ATC code: None

Identifiers
- IUPAC name: 3-amino-5,7-diethyladamantan-1-yl nitrate
- CAS Number: 765890-91-3
- PubChem CID: 130449551
- UNII: VB3DW89EP2
- CompTox Dashboard (EPA): DTXSID301045555

Chemical and physical data
- Formula: C_{14}H_{24}N_{2}O_{3}
- Molar mass: 268.357 g·mol^{−1}
- 3D model (JSmol): Interactive image
- SMILES: N[C@@]12C[C@]3(O[N+]([O-])=O)C[C@@](C2)(CC)C[C@@](C1)(CC)C3

Nitromemantine (developmental code names YQW-36 and EM-036), also known as NitroSynapsin, is a derivative of memantine developed in 2006 for the treatment of Alzheimer's disease. It has been shown to reduce excitotoxicity mediated by over-activation of the glutamatergic system, by blocking NMDA receptors. It was being developed for treatment of Alzheimer's disease and pervasive developmental disorders like autism, but development was discontinued in 2023.

== Pharmacology ==
Like memantine, nitromemantine is a low-affinity voltage-dependent uncompetitive antagonist at glutamatergic NMDA receptors, however nitromemantine selectively inhibits extrasynaptic NMDA receptors while sparing normal physiological synaptic NMDA receptor activity, resulting in less side effects and a greater neuroprotective action, as well as stimulating regrowth of synapses with prolonged administration. The discoverers of nitromemantine have demonstrated that the amyloid-β peptide associated with Alzheimer's disease acts as an agonist at α7 nicotinic acetylcholine receptors, chronic overstimulation of which then results in uncontrolled release of glutamate, and consequent excitotoxicity. By blocking extrasynaptic NMDA receptors, nitromemantine is able to largely prevent this excitotoxicity while minimising the side effects usually seen with less selective NMDA antagonists. The nitrate group of nitromemantine was found to bind to a second site on the extrasynaptic NMDA receptor which had previously been targeted with nitroglycerin, and this double action is thought to be responsible for the increased effectiveness of nitromemantine.

== See also ==
- Memantine
- Neramexane
- Amantadine
