= EVT-103 =

Chemical compound

Clinical data
- Other names: ENS-103
- Routes of administration: By mouth
- Drug class: NMDA receptor antagonist

Identifiers
- CAS Number: 2457151-78-7

EVT-103, also known as ENS-103, is an experimental medication which originated from Roche and is under development by Evotec AG for the treatment of major depressive disorder. It acts as an NMDA receptor subunit 2B (NR2B) antagonist. As of November 2017, no recent reports of development for major depressive disorder have been identified. The drug was developed as a follow-up compound to EVT-101. The chemical structure of EVT-103 has not been released.

== See also ==
- List of investigational antidepressants
