= Kaitocephalin =

Names
- Systematic IUPAC name (2R,5R)-2-[(1S,2R)-2-Amino-2-carboxy-1-hydroxyethyl]-5-[(2S)-2-carboxy-2-(3,5-dichloro-4-hydroxybenzamido)ethyl]pyrrolidine-2-carboxylic acid

Identifiers
CAS Number	198710-92-8
3D model (JSmol)	Interactive image
ChemSpider	9504346
PubChem CID	11329395
UNII	9B96C79PCS
CompTox Dashboard (EPA)	DTXSID801316521
- InChI: InChI=1S/C18H21Cl2N3O9/c19-8-3-6(4-9(20)12(8)24)14(26)22-10(15(27)28)5-7-1-2-18(23-7,17(31)32)13(25)11(21)16(29)30/h3-4,7,10-11,13,23-25H,1-2,5,21H2,(H,22,26)(H,27,28)(H,29,30)(H,31,32)/t7-,10+,11-,13+,18-/m1/s1 Key: AJQRDRIPQOAJCM-BWOKQULHSA-N
- SMILES: O=C(O)[C@H](N)[C@H](O)[C@]2(C(=O)O)N[C@@H](C[C@H](NC(=O)c1cc(Cl)c(O)c(Cl)c1)C(=O)O)CC2

Properties
Chemical formula	C_{18}H_{21}Cl_{2}N_{3}O_{9}
Molar mass	494.28 g·mol^{−1}
- Except where otherwise noted, data are given for materials in their standard state (at 25 °C [77 °F], 100 kPa). Infobox references

Kaitocephalin is a non-selective ionotropic glutamate receptor antagonist, meaning it blocks the action of the neurotransmitter glutamate. It is produced by the fungus Eupenicillium shearii. Although similar molecules have been produced synthetically, kaitocephalin is the only known naturally occurring glutamate receptor antagonist. There is some evidence that kaitocephalin can protect the brain and central nervous system, so it is said to have neuroprotective properties. Kaitocephalin protects neurons by inhibiting excitotoxicity, a mechanism which causes cell death by overloading neurons with glutamate. Because of this, it is of interest as a potential scaffold for drug development. Drugs based on kaitocephalin may be useful in treating neurological conditions, including Alzheimer's, amyotrophic lateral sclerosis (ALS), and stroke.

== Synthesis ==
Kaitocephalin was originally isolated in 1997 from Eupenicillium shearii, a fungus in the same genus as those that produce penicillin. Its absolute configuration was determined in 2001. Due to the small amounts of kaitocephalin available, its absolute structure was not determined through chemical degradation. Instead, NMR spectroscopy was performed on derivatives of kaitocephalin. Other methods used to determine its absolute configuration included Mosher's method and NOESY.

Only small amounts of kaitocephalin are produced naturally, making it an attractive target for synthesis. To date, nine syntheses have been reported by seven research groups. The first synthesis was performed in 2001 by a team at the University of Tokyo. In addition, three structure-activity relationship (SAR) studies of kaitocephalin have been performed. Novel reaction mechanisms have been used in at least two syntheses, including the original synthesis in 2001. A key step in this synthesis was the reaction of a nitrone and an alkyl halide with zinc in aqueous solution and under sonication. This reaction enabled the stereoselective formation of a C-C bond, ensuring that the product's absolute configuration was correct.

Another novel reaction was discovered by a group at the University of California, Irvine in 2007. To form kaitocephalin's pyrrolidine core, a stereoconvergent cyclization reaction was discovered. A mixture of anti and syn isomers that undergoes this reaction will favor the trans product, regardless of the initial ratios used. This removes the need for an additional chiral reagent to obtain the desired stereochemistry. The mechanism for this cyclization is not yet understood. Difficulties in synthesis include the formation of the substituted pyrrolidine core, the incorporation of the C2 and C9 amino acids, and the formation of the C3 and C4 stereocenters.

== Mechanism of action ==
Kaitocephalin acts by inhibiting glutamate receptors. Glutamate is the most abundant neurotransmitter in the vertebrate nervous system and is involved in learning, memory, and neuroplasticity. It is an excitatory neurotransmitter, so binding of glutamate to its receptors increases ion flow through the postsynaptic membrane. Excess glutamate can lead to cell death and neurological damage through a phenomenon called excitotoxicity. Excitotoxicity occurs when calcium ion influx creates a positive feedback loop, leading to breakdown of the cell membrane and apoptosis. This process is part of the ischemic cascade, when low blood supply (ischemia) causes a series of events leading to cell death; this is the mechanism by which strokes cause brain damage. High levels of glutamate have also been linked to the neuronal degeneration observed in Alzheimer's disease, Parkinson's disease, and epilepsy.

Glutamate receptors are classified as either metabotropic or ionotropic. The ionotropic receptors are further divided into NMDA, AMPA, and kainate receptors. Kaitocephalin is a potent competitive antagonist of both NMDA and AMPA receptors, although it has a stronger affinity for NMDA receptors. Kaitocephalin's IC_{50} for NMDA receptors is around 75 nM, while its IC_{50} for AMPA receptors is 200-600 nM. It is also a weak inhibitor of kainate receptors, with an IC_{50} of around 100 μM. Since the ischemic cascade involves overstimulation of NMDA and AMPA receptors, kaitocephalin may be able to inhibit this process, giving it neuroprotective properties. This makes it an attractive starting point to develop treatments for neurological conditions, including Alzheimer's disease, ALS, Parkinson's disease, epilepsy, and stroke.

== See also ==
- Memantine
- CNQX
- Quinoxalinedione
