= C14H19N =

The molecular formula C_{14}H_{19}N (molar mass: 201.31 g/mol, exact mass: 201.1517 u) may refer to:

- Camfetamine (N-methyl-3-phenyl-norbornan-2-amine)
- EXP-561
- PD-137889 (N-methylhexahydrofluorenamine)
