= C15H21N =

The molecular formula C_{15}H_{21}N (molar mass: 120.15 g/mol) may refer to:

- 8A-PDHQ, also known as 8a-Phenyldecahydroquinoline
- Fencamfamin, also known as fencamfamine
