= C7H14NO5P =

The molecular formula C_{7}H_{14}NO_{5}P (molar mass: 223.16 g/mol) may refer to:

- Monocrotophos, an organophosphate insecticide
- Selfotel, a competitive NMDA antagonist
