= Nelonemdaz =

Chemical compound

Legal status
- Legal status: Investigational

Identifiers
- IUPAC name: 2-Hydroxy-5-[[2,3,5,6-tetrafluoro-4-(trifluoromethyl)phenyl]methylamino]benzoic acid
- CAS Number: 640290-67-1
- PubChem CID: 9951955
- UNII: TP6PKI8CQP

Chemical and physical data
- Formula: C_{15}H_{8}F_{7}NO_{3}
- Molar mass: 383.222 g·mol^{−1}
- 3D model (JSmol): Interactive image
- SMILES: C1=CC(=C(C=C1NCC2=C(C(=C(C(=C2F)F)C(F)(F)F)F)F)C(=O)O)O
- InChI: InChI=1S/C15H8F7NO3/c16-10-7(11(17)13(19)9(12(10)18)15(20,21)22)4-23-5-1-2-8(24)6(3-5)14(25)26/h1-3,23-24H,4H2,(H,25,26); Key:HABROHXUHNHQMY-UHFFFAOYSA-N

Nelonemdaz is an experimental drug that works as a free radical reducer and selective antagonist of the NMDA receptor 2b. It is hypothesized to have neuroprotective effects in people who recently experienced a stroke.
