= Bading =

Bading may refer to:

- Gerhard Adolph Bading (1870–1946), American politician and diplomat
- Hilmar Bading (b. 1958), German physician and neuroscientist
- Bading Pob. (Bgy. 22), a place in Butuan, Philippines
