= 5,7-Dichlorokynurenic acid =

Names
- Preferred IUPAC name 5,7-Dichloro-4-oxo-1,4-dihydroquinoline-2-carboxylic acid

Identifiers
CAS Number	131123-76-7
3D model (JSmol)	Interactive image
ChemSpider	1714
IUPHAR/BPS	2361
PubChem CID	1779
UNII	T61ORK73PY
CompTox Dashboard (EPA)	DTXSID80893710
- InChI: InChI=1S/C10H5Cl2NO3/c11-4-1-5(12)9-6(2-4)13-7(10(15)16)3-8(9)14/h1-3H,(H,13,14)(H,15,16) Key: BGKFPRIGXAVYNX-UHFFFAOYSA-N; InChI=1/C10H5Cl2NO3/c11-4-1-5(12)9-6(2-4)13-7(10(15)16)3-8(9)14/h1-3H,(H,13,14)(H,15,16) Key: BGKFPRIGXAVYNX-UHFFFAOYAD
- SMILES: C1=C(C=C2C(=C1Cl)C(=O)C=C(N2)C(=O)O)Cl

Properties
Chemical formula	C_{10}H_{5}Cl_{2}NO_{3}
Molar mass	258.05 g·mol^{−1}
- Except where otherwise noted, data are given for materials in their standard state (at 25 °C [77 °F], 100 kPa). verify (what is ?) Infobox references

5,7-Dichlorokynurenic acid (DCKA) is a selective NMDA receptor antagonist acting at the glycine site of the NMDA receptor complex.

== See also ==
- 7-Chlorokynurenic acid
- Kynurenic acid
