= Acquired neuroprotection =

Acquired neuroprotection is a synaptic-activity-dependent form of adaptation in the nervous system that renders neurons more resistant to harmful conditions. The term was coined by Hilmar Bading. This use-dependent enhancement of cellular survival activity requires changes in gene expression triggered by neuronal activity and nuclear calcium signaling. In rodents, components of the neuroprotective gene program can reduce brain damage caused by seizure-like activity or by a stroke. In acute and chronic neurodegenerative diseases, gene regulatory events important for acquired neuroprotection are antagonized by extrasynaptic NMDA receptor signaling leading to increased vulnerability, loss of structural integrity, and bioenergetics dysfunction.
