= Rislenemdaz =

Investigational antidepressant compound

Clinical data
- Other names: CERC-301; MK-0657
- Routes of administration: By mouth
- Drug class: Selective NMDA receptor antagonist

Identifiers
- IUPAC name: 4-Methylbenzyl (3S,4R)-3-fluoro-4-[(2-pyrimidinylamino)methyl]-1-piperidinecarboxylate
- CAS Number: 808732-98-1
- PubChem CID: 11394238
- ChemSpider: 9569140
- UNII: 5HAM167S5T
- KEGG: D11340
- ChEMBL: ChEMBL2068839
- CompTox Dashboard (EPA): DTXSID801031864

Chemical and physical data
- Formula: C_{19}H_{23}FN_{4}O_{2}
- Molar mass: 358.417 g·mol^{−1}
- 3D model (JSmol): Interactive image
- SMILES: CC1=CC=C(C=C1)COC(=O)N2CC[C@@H]([C@@H](C2)F)CNC3=NC=CC=N3
- InChI: InChI=1S/C19H23FN4O2/c1-14-3-5-15(6-4-14)13-26-19(25)24-10-7-16(17(20)12-24)11-23-18-21-8-2-9-22-18/h2-6,8-9,16-17H,7,10-13H2,1H3,(H,21,22,23)/t16-,17-/m1/s1; Key:RECBFDWSXWAXHY-IAGOWNOFSA-N

Rislenemdaz (developmental code names CERC-301, MK-0657) was an orally active, selective NMDA receptor subunit 2B (NR2B) antagonist which is under development by Cerecor in the United States as an adjunctive therapy for treatment-resistant depression (TRD). In November 2013, phase II clinical trials were initiated, and in the same month, rislenemdaz received Fast Track Designation from the Food and Drug Administration for TRD.

A pilot study was published in 2012, and a phase II trial was completed in 2014, but was deemed insufficient. A second attempt at a phase II trial in 2016 also found that the drug failed to demonstrate efficacy against depression.

== Pharmacology ==
Rislenemdaz is a small-molecule antagonist of the NMDA receptor. The NMDA receptor is composed of several subunits, but rislenemdaz is specific for the GluN2B subunits which are only seen in the spinal cord and forebrain. Rislenemdaz binds specifically to the GluN2B subunit in order to prevent endogenous glutamate from acting on it. It is considered to be a novel drug for the treatment of MDD and TRD for its immediate onset of efficacy in an oral dosage form. Rislenemdaz and its active metabolite have been shown to have an onset of action of about 1 hour and half-lives of 12–17 h and 21–26 h, respectively. It has been proven to have a very high binding affinity for its target (K_{i} = 8.1 nM). This specificity allows rislenemdaz to mitigate the symptoms of depression without having many adverse effects due to off-target binding.

== History ==
=== Commercial development ===
Cerecor acquired the exclusive rights from Merck in 2013 to develop an NMDA receptor antagonist for the treatment of major depressive disorder (MDD). This compound acquired from Merck would eventually become rislenemdaz. Funds generated through the IPO of Cerecor in 2015 and a common stock purchase agreement with Aspire Capital Fund in 2016 are being used to further develop the molecule. Cerecor currently holds three families of patents regarding rislenemdaz in the United States as well as several other countries. These patents cover composition of matter, methods of manufacture, methods of use, as well as picture claims to rislenemdaz and any pharmaceutical salts of it. These patents will begin to expire in 2022 but some will not expire until 2035.

Commercial competitors of the drug include Naurex's apimostinel (NRX-1074) and 4-chlorokynurenine (AV-101) from VistaGen Therapeutics.

=== Preliminary research ===
Research into the use of ketamine to treat MDD had already determined that the drug could have effectiveness in rapidly reducing the symptoms of depression. Unfortunately ketamine has powerful dissociative effects, leaving patients in a trance-like state after administration and lending itself to recreational abuse. In 2008 a proof of concept study was conducted by Pfizer using the NR2B antagonist traxoprodil, which proved that drugs similar to ketamine could be used to treat depressive symptoms without causing the dissociative effect seen in that drug. Traxoprodil was eventually dropped from development due to bioavailability issues and the possibility of it causing QT prolongation.

The first preclinical study of rislenemdaz was conducted in 2015 and was primarily geared towards assessing the molecule's safety and pharmacokinetic profile in rats and a small group of men. The study showed that rislenemdaz was very orally bioavailable, rapid acting, and that it was safe compared to other similar molecules which had caused neurodegenerative problems in rats. A clinical trial with 135 subjects revealed that rislenemdaz does not have any influence on ECG in humans as is seen in traxoprodil.

== Clinical trials ==
=== Phase II ===
Rislenemdaz initiated its first phase II randomized double blind clinical trial (NCT01941043) in November, 2013. This study was funded through a $32 million Series B Financing tranche led by venture capital companies such as New Enterprise Associates (NEA), Apple Tree Partners (ATP) and MPM Capital. The trial consisted of 135 patients diagnosed with MDD who were resistant to SSRI/SNRI treatment. The study lasted 28 days and saw patients receiving 8 mg/day doses of rislenemdaz in order to see a change in the Hamilton Depression Rating Scale (HDRS) of the patient by day 7, but no significant changes were noted.

However, in March 2015, Cerecor announced that the 8 mg dose for the study did not meet the primary objective for the study, although the study showed the safety and tolerance of rislenemdaz. The company also announced that in a separate study, higher daily doses of drug were able to safely treat patients, indicating that higher doses of drug could be used in future clinical trials.

Cerecor conducted a second double blind, randomized, placebo controlled phase II clinical trial (NCT02459236) studying the effects of 12 mg/day and 20 mg/day doses of rislenemdaz on patients with MDD. Numerous changes were made to the study in order to achieve a greater likelihood of success and new top-line data from this study in November 2016. However, the study reported in November 2016 that the drug failed to demonstrate efficacy.

== See also ==
- List of investigational antidepressants
- List of investigational orthostatic intolerance drugs
