= Olney's lesions =

Neurotoxicity caused by some NMDA receptor antagonists

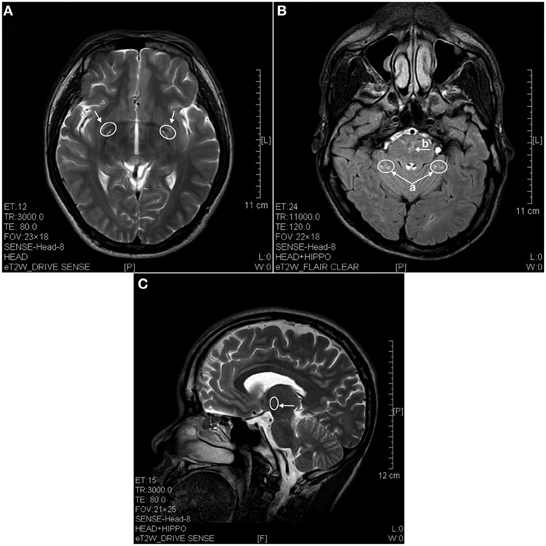

Olney's lesions, also known as NMDA receptor antagonist neurotoxicity (NAT), is a form of brain damage consisting of selective death of neurons but not glia, observed in restricted brain regions of rats and certain other animal models exposed to large quantities of psychoactive drugs that inhibit the normal operation of the neuronal NMDA receptor. NMDA antagonism is common in anesthesia, as well as certain psychiatric treatments.

The visible signs of NAT are named after John Olney, who conducted a study in 1989 to investigate neurotoxicity caused by PCP and related drugs. It is unclear whether the phenomenon is relevant to the practice of modern medicine: most NMDA antagonists are co-administered with other drugs that reduce neurotoxicity.

== Clinical effects ==
NMDA receptor antagonists include physician-prescribed drugs for therapeutic treatment of human diseases such as memantine for Alzheimer's disease.

In anesthesiology, many general anesthetics generate their dissociative effect through NMDA receptor antagonism. These anesthetics are typically administered with positive allosteric GABA_{A}-receptor modulators to prevent any neurotoxicity they might cause. Drugs that work to suppress NAT include anticholinergics, benzodiazepines, barbiturates and Alpha-adrenergic agonists, such as clonidine. Conversely, coadministration of NMDA-antagonists with α-2 adrenergic antagonists, like yohimbine, could theoretically potentiate NAT.

== History ==
=== Development in rats ===
In the late 1980s, John Olney, a researcher specializing in excitotoxicity, the phenomenon where persistently high neurotransmitter concentrations damage nerve cells, began to investigate the pharmacology of NMDA receptor antagonists. Other workers had recently begun proposing to use NMDA antagonists PCP, MK-801 (dizocilpine) and ketamine in clinical trials for various psychological effects; but the drugs' current illegality meant that scientists had no record of pharmacological response to guide safe use. Olney and his coworkers discovered that, when they injected rats with PCP, dizocilpine, ketamine, or the addition NMDA antagonist tiletamine, the rat brains rapidly developed cell-level vacuolation, a sign of biochemical stress. Within two hours, mitochondria had begun to lyse, and other cytotoxic changes were apparent, peaking at 12 hours following administration. If cells were to recover, they did so within 24 hours, but unrecovered cells went on to neuronal cell death in dissected animals.

The regions of the brain that show neuronal death are remarkably restricted, and consist chiefly of the cingulate and retrosplenial cortex.

Varying the dosing regimes revealed that the drugs' lesiary potency correlated with their NMDA antagonism (MK-801 > PCP > tiletamine > ketamine). Repeated administration had the same effect as single administration, leading to the conclusion that either the drugs were not cumulatively neurotoxic or that neurotoxicity had already proceeded irreversibly after a single administration.

Researcher Roland N. Auer conducted similar studies to look at the correlation between age and sex and the development of NMDA receptor antagonist neurotoxicity in test rats. Older rats experienced a much higher mortality rate after the development of NAT, and female rats were found, at all ages, to have a higher incidence of necrotic (dead) neurons as a result of NAT.

Dextromethorphan, a common antitussive often found in cough medicines, has been shown to cause vacuolization in rats' brains when administered at doses of 75 mg/(kg ip). However, oral administration of dextromethorphan hydrobromide (DXM HBr) to female rats in single doses as high as 120 mg/kg did not result in detectable neurotoxic changes at 4–6 hours or 24–26 hours post-dose (female rats are more sensitive to NMDA antagonist neurotoxicity). The same researchers also found no evidence of neurotoxic changes in retrosplenial or cingulate cortices of male rats orally administered up to 400 mg/(kg day) DXM HBr or female rats orally administered 120 mg/(kg day) DXM HBr, both for 30 days. Carliss et al. (2007) also found that rats administered 9 mg/(kg day sc) (+)-MK-801 hydrogen maleate for 30 days did produce detectable vacuolation as expected. When 30 mg/(kg ip) dextrorphan was administered to male rats, neurotoxic changes were observed only 30 minutes post-dose.

Nitrous oxide, a common anesthetic for humans (especially in dentistry), has also been shown to cause vacuolization in rats' brains, but caused no irreversible lesions.

=== Controversy regarding human analogues ===
In 1999, an autopsy study by Johannes Kornhuber of 8 patients who had received amantadine therapy looked at the selectively vulnerable brain regions where Olney's lesions occur, the cingulate and retrosplenial cortex, and found no evidence of Olney's lesions.

In Ketamine: Dreams and Realities, Karl Jansen writes:

Roland Auer injected the common squirrel monkey with Dizocilpine, or MK-801 and was unable to produce any vacuoles.

The brain regions where Olney's lesions occur show hypermetabolism [R]ats have rates of brain metabolism that are almost twice as high as those in humans to start with. It is because of this higher basal rate of cerebral metabolism that lesions may appear in rodents but not in large and mature primate brains. Ketamine causes over-excitement and euphoria in rats at doses below those at which it activates shutdown systems.

Frank Sharp also works in this area. I discussed with Sharp how this issue stood in 1998. His view was that reversible toxic changes in the rat started to appear at 40mg/kg and reached a level at which no further changes occurred (a plateau) at 100mg/kg, when a little cell death could be seen - but matters would not progress beyond this point. Extensive attempts to produce toxic changes in monkeys had been a total failure at doses up to 10mg/kg i.m. These Gorilla studies are unpublished.

I sought the view of Olney's colleague, Dr Nuri Farber. The work of his team indicated that N-P receptors must be blocked for at least 2 hours to cause reversible changes, and at least 24 hours to produce some cell death, in rats. [...][H]e thought that the methods used in monkey studies so far were unsatisfactory, because the animals were probably too young. Only adult rats show the toxic changes. He was not prepared to accept a clean bill of health for the drug in primates until this work with elderly Gorillas had been done, and until the drug companies published their Gorilla studies to support their claims of harmlessness.

There is thus no published evidence at this time (January 2000) that ketamine can produce toxic cell changes in monkeys. The unpublished monkey data that we know about, that of Frank Sharp, actually shows that there is no damage at doses up to 10mg/kg.

— Karl Jansen, Ketamine: Dreams and Realities (2004)

In 2013 a study using magnetic resonance imaging showed brain lesions in ketamine addicts (using from 0.2g twice a week up to 1g daily for 0.5 up to 12 years) with severity depending on the duration of addiction and daily intake of ketamine. Cortical atrophy and holes in superficial white matter are seen early on. After 4 years of addiction lesions spread throughout the brain and damage is evident in the pons and other deeper brain structures.

== See also ==
- NMDA receptor
- NMDA receptor antagonist
- Dissociative
- Neurotoxic drug
