= Midafotel =

Chemical compound

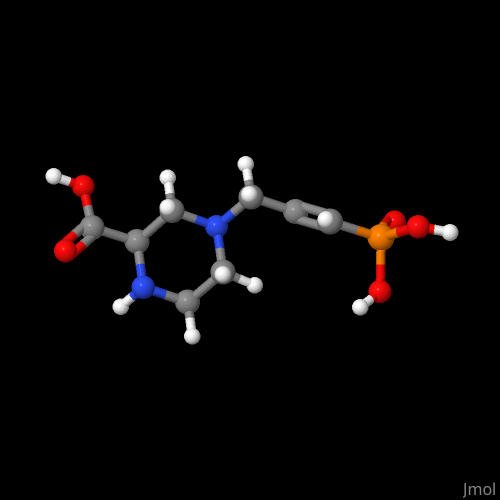

Clinical data
- Other names: CPPene, Midafotel, SDZ EAA 494
- ATC code: none

Pharmacokinetic data
- Excretion: Renal

Identifiers
- IUPAC name: (R)-4-[(E)- 3-phosphonoprop- 2-enyl]piperazine- 2-carboxylic acid
- CAS Number: 117414-74-1
- PubChem CID: 6437356
- IUPHAR/BPS: 4170
- ChemSpider: 4940497
- UNII: 7LYU6ZF84G
- ChEBI: CHEBI:180900
- CompTox Dashboard (EPA): DTXSID001179674

Chemical and physical data
- Formula: C_{8}H_{15}N_{2}O_{5}P
- Molar mass: 250.191 g·mol^{−1}
- 3D model (JSmol): Interactive image
- SMILES: C1CN(C[C@@H](N1)C(=O)O)C/C=C/P(=O)(O)O
- InChI: InChI=1S/C8H15N2O5P/c11-8(12)7-6-10(4-2-9-7)3-1-5-16(13,14)15/h1,5,7,9H,2-4,6H2,(H,11,12)(H2,13,14,15)/b5-1+/t7-/m1/s1; Key:VZXMZMJSGLFKQI-ABVWVHJUSA-N

Midafotel (CPPene; SDZ EAA 494) is a potent, competitive antagonist at the NMDA receptor. It was originally designed as a potential therapy for excitotoxicity, epilepsy or neuropathic pain. It looked very promising in in vitro trials proving to be a potent competitive antagonist at the NMDA without affecting other receptors. Research continued through to in vivo cat studies where it proved to limit damage after occluding the middle cerebral artery, leading to ischaemia. It also blocked photosensitive epilepsies in baboons.

CPPene had a pharmacokinetic profile suitable for progressing to clinical trials, as it has no toxic byproducts, is excreted exclusively via the renal system, and remains unchanged in the brain.

However, CPPene was removed from clinical trials, as it provided no suitable neuronal protection or beneficial treatment for epilepsy, and had side effects which led to many patients withdrawing from trials. A possible explanation for its lack of efficacy in trials is the relatively short therapeutic time window following ischaemic damage and the fact that a small amount of glutamate helps neuronal survival. It is also believed that some "pro-survival" genes are activated by NMDA receptors.

== See also ==
- NMDA receptor antagonist
