= John Olney =

American medical doctor and neuropathologist (1931–2015)

John Olney (1932 – April 14, 2015) was a physician and a professor of psychiatry, pathology, and immunology at the Washington University School of Medicine. He is known for his work on brain damage. He coined the term excitotoxicity in his 1969 paper published in Science. Olney's lesions are named after him.

In 1996 he was elected to the Institute of Medicine of the United States National Academy of Sciences. He had campaigned for greater regulation of monosodium glutamate (MSG), and aspartame and other excitotoxins for over twenty years. Following his research on MSG and publication of his findings in his 1969 paper, his experimentation methods, results and conclusions have been heavily criticised, disproved and lampooned. He died at his residence on April 14, 2015 at the age of 83.
