= CGP-37849 =

Chemical compound

Clinical data
- Other names: CGP-37849, CGP-40116

Identifiers
- IUPAC name: (E,2R)-2-amino-4-methyl-5-phosphonopent-3-enoic acid
- CAS Number: 137424-81-8
- PubChem CID: 6604869
- ChemSpider: 5037128
- UNII: 76IND1BS43
- ChEMBL: ChEMBL29811
- CompTox Dashboard (EPA): DTXSID901214124

Chemical and physical data
- Formula: C_{6}H_{12}NO_{5}P
- Molar mass: 209.138 g·mol^{−1}
- 3D model (JSmol): Interactive image
- SMILES: C/C(=C\[C@H](C(=O)O)N)/CP(=O)(O)O
- InChI: InChI=1S/C6H12NO5P/c1-4(3-13(10,11)12)2-5(7)6(8)9/h2,5H,3,7H2,1H3,(H,8,9)(H2,10,11,12)/b4-2+/t5-/m1/s1; Key:BDYHNCZIGYIOGJ-XWCPEMDWSA-N

CGP-37849 is a competitive antagonist at the NMDA receptor. It is a potent, orally active anticonvulsant in animal models, and was researched for the treatment of epilepsy. It also has neuroprotective activity and shows antidepressant and anxiolytic effects.
