= 4-Chlorokynurenine =

Investigational antidepressant compound

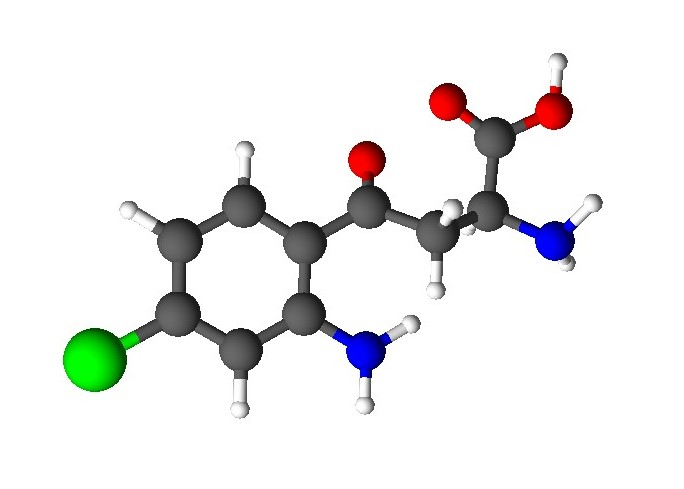

Clinical data
- Other names: 4-Cl-KYN; AV-101; 3-(4-Chloroanthraniloyl)-DL-alanine
- Routes of administration: By mouth
- Drug class: NMDA receptor antagonist
- ATC code: None

Legal status
- Legal status: US: Investigational New Drug

Pharmacokinetic data
- Bioavailability: 39–84% (rodents); ≥ 31% (humans)
- Elimination half-life: 2–3 hours

Identifiers
- IUPAC name: (2S)-2-Amino-4-(2-amino-4-chlorophenyl)-4-oxobutanoic acid
- CAS Number: 153152-32-0
- PubChem CID: 9859632
- ChemSpider: 151423
- UNII: 77XLH9L40B
- CompTox Dashboard (EPA): DTXSID30997196

Chemical and physical data
- Formula: C_{10}H_{11}ClN_{2}O_{3}
- Molar mass: 242.66 g·mol^{−1}
- 3D model (JSmol): Interactive image
- SMILES: O=C(C[C@H](N)C(=O)O)c1ccc(Cl)cc1N
- InChI: InChI=1S/C10H11ClN2O3/c11-5-1-2-6(7(12)3-5)9(14)4-8(13)10(15)16/h1-3,8H,4,12-13H2,(H,15,16)/t8-/m0/s1; Key:HQLHZNDJQSRKDT-QMMMGPOBSA-N

L-4-Chlorokynurenine (4-Cl-KYN; developmental code name AV-101) is an orally active small molecule prodrug of 7-chlorokynurenic acid, a NMDA receptor antagonist. It was investigated as a potential rapid-acting antidepressant.

AV-101 was discovered at Marion Merrell Dow and its biological activity was explored at University of Maryland. It underwent initial development at Artemis Neuroscience which was acquired by VistaGen in 2003. A phase II clinical trial failed to show any effect over placebo in alleviating treatment-resistant depression.

== Pharmacology ==
Stylized depiction of an activated NMDAR. Glutamate is in the glutamate-binding site and glycine is in the glycine-binding site. 4-Chlorokynurenine inhibits NMDARs at the glycine binding site.

4-Chlorokynurenine penetrates the blood–brain barrier via the large neutral amino acid transporter 1. In the central nervous system it is converted to 7-chlorokynurenic acid by kynurenine aminotransferase in astrocytes.

Most of its therapeutic potential is believed to occur via 7-chlorokynurenic acid which inhibits the glycine co-agonist site of NMDA receptors.

Another metabolite, 4-chloro-3-hydroxy-anthranilic acid, inhibits the enzyme 3-hydroxyanthranilate oxidase, which provides a rationale for further testing in neurodegenerative diseases.

== Chemistry ==
4-Chlorokynurenine is prodrug of 7-chlorokynurenic acid (7-Cl-KYNA), which in turn is a halogenated derivative of L-kynurenine.

== History ==
Artemis Neuroscience was formed to develop work done by University of Maryland professor Robert Schwartz in collaboration with scientists at Marion Merrell Dow (which became part of Sanofi by way of Aventis); this work included AV-101.

VistaGen acquired AV-101 when it acquired Artemis in 2003.

VistaGen filed an Investigational New Drug application with the FDA for use of AV-101 in neuropathic pain in 2013.

In 2013, other NMDA receptor antagonists in clinical trials for depression included lanicemine, esketamine, and rapastinel, with lanicemine being the most advanced.

== Research ==
By 2013, AV-101 had successfully gone through two Phase I clinical trials. In 2016, a Phase II clinical trial was initiated to assess AV-101 in treatment-resistant major depression. The trial found no difference in treatment effects between AV-101 and placebo.

Preclinical studies in animal models suggested efficacy in treating neuropathic pain. AV-101 showed efficacy in an animal model of Huntington's disease and rapid-acting antidepressant effects similar to ketamine in behavioral models of depression in rodents.

== See also ==
- List of investigational antidepressants
