= LY-235959 =

Chemical compound

Identifiers
- IUPAC name: (3S,4aR,6S,8aR)-6-(phosphonomethyl)-1,2,3,4,4a,5,6,7,8, 8a-decahydroisoquinoline-3-carboxylic acid
- CAS Number: 137433-06-8
- PubChem CID: 131938
- ChemSpider: 116555
- UNII: AR2BHC0C6P
- CompTox Dashboard (EPA): DTXSID101336227 DTXSID20929264, DTXSID101336227

Chemical and physical data
- Formula: C_{11}H_{20}NO_{5}P
- Molar mass: 277.257 g·mol^{−1}
- 3D model (JSmol): Interactive image
- SMILES: [H][C@]12[C@](CC[C@H](CP(O)(O)=O)C2)([H])CN[C@H](C(O)=O)C1
- InChI: InChI=1S/C11H20NO5P/c13-11(14)10-4-9-3-7(6-18(15,16)17)1-2-8(9)5-12-10/h7-10,12H,1-6H2,(H,13,14)(H2,15,16,17)/t7-,8-,9+,10-/m0/s1; Key:STIRHCNEGQQBOY-QEYWKRMJSA-N

LY-235959 is a competitive antagonist at the NMDA receptor. It has analgesic and neuroprotective effects and causes hypothermia in animal models, as well as reducing the development of tolerance to morphine and altering the reinforcing effects of cocaine.
