= Besonprodil =

Chemical compound

Clinical data
- Other names: CI-1041
- ATC code: None

Identifiers
- IUPAC name: 6-[2-(4-[(4-fluorophenyl)methyl]piperidin-1-yl)ethylsulfinyl]-3H-1,3-benzoxazol-2-one
- CAS Number: 253450-09-8
- PubChem CID: 156328
- ChemSpider: 137662
- UNII: 5K3N2D15WW
- ChEMBL: ChEMBL219631
- CompTox Dashboard (EPA): DTXSID2047270

Chemical and physical data
- Formula: C_{21}H_{23}FN_{2}O_{3}S
- Molar mass: 402.48 g·mol^{−1}
- 3D model (JSmol): Interactive image
- SMILES: c4cc(F)ccc4CC(CC2)CCN2CCS(=O)c(cc1o3)ccc1[nH]c3=O
- InChI: InChI=1S/C21H23FN2O3S/c22-17-3-1-15(2-4-17)13-16-7-9-24(10-8-16)11-12-28(26)18-5-6-19-20(14-18)27-21(25)23-19/h1-6,14,16H,7-13H2,(H,23,25); Key:FCBQJNCAKZSIAH-UHFFFAOYSA-N

Besonprodil (CI-1041) is a drug which acts as an NMDA antagonist, selective for the NR2B subunit. It is under development as a supplemental medication for Parkinson's disease, and has been shown in animals to be effective in counteracting the dyskinesias associated with long-term treatment with levodopa and related drugs.
