= 7-Chlorokynurenic acid =

Names
- Preferred IUPAC name 7-Chloro-4-oxo-1,4-dihydroquinoline-2-carboxylic acid
- Other names 7-Chlorokynurenate; 7-CTKA

Identifiers
CAS Number	18000-24-3
3D model (JSmol)	Interactive image
ChEBI	CHEBI:63965
ChEMBL	ChEMBL311389
ChemSpider	1813
ECHA InfoCard	100.038.088
EC Number	241-913-6
PubChem CID	1884
UNII	S7936QON2K
CompTox Dashboard (EPA)	DTXSID7042568
- InChI: InChI=1S/C10H6ClNO3/c11-5-1-2-6-7(3-5)12-8(10(14)15)4-9(6)13/h1-4H,(H,12,13)(H,14,15) Key: UAWVRVFHMOSAPU-UHFFFAOYSA-N
- SMILES: C1=CC2=C(C=C1Cl)NC(=CC2=O)C(=O)O

Properties
Chemical formula	C_{10}H_{6}ClNO_{3}
Molar mass	223.61 g·mol^{−1}
- Except where otherwise noted, data are given for materials in their standard state (at 25 °C [77 °F], 100 kPa). Infobox references

7-Chlorokynurenic acid (7-CKA) is a tool compound that acts as a potent and selective competitive antagonist of the glycine site of the NMDA receptor. It produces ketamine-like rapid antidepressant effects in animal models of depression. However, 7-CKA is unable to cross the blood-brain-barrier, and for this reason, is unsuitable for clinical use. As a result, a centrally-penetrant prodrug of 7-CKA, 4-chlorokynurenine (AV-101), has been developed for use in humans, and is being studied in clinical trials as a potential treatment for major depressive disorder, and anti-nociception. In addition to antagonizing the NMDA receptor, 7-CKA also acts as a potent inhibitor of the reuptake of glutamate into synaptic vesicles (or as a vesicular glutamate reuptake inhibitor), an action that it mediates via competitive blockade of vesicular glutamate transporters (K_{i} = 0.59 mM).

== See also ==
- 5,7-Dichlorokynurenic acid
- Evans blue
- Kynurenic acid
- Xanthurenic acid
