= PD-137889 =

Names
- IUPAC name (4aR)-N-Methyl-1,2,3,4,9,9a-hexahydro-4aH-fluoren-4a-amine

Identifiers
3D model (JSmol)	Interactive image
ChemSpider	8279807
PubChem CID	10104280
UNII	2KU62QB3UM
CompTox Dashboard (EPA)	DTXSID101337144
- InChI: InChI=1S/C14H19N/c1-15-14-9-5-4-7-12(14)10-11-6-2-3-8-13(11)14/h2-3,6,8,12,15H,4-5,7,9-10H2,1H3 Key: KQLIVVYSTDBTMZ-UHFFFAOYSA-N
- SMILES: c12c(cccc1)C3(NC)CCCCC3C2

Properties
Chemical formula	C_{14}H_{19}N
Molar mass	201.313 g·mol^{−1}
- Except where otherwise noted, data are given for materials in their standard state (at 25 °C [77 °F], 100 kPa). Infobox references

PD-137889 (N-methylhexahydrofluorenamine) is a chemical compound that is active as an NMDA receptor antagonist in the central nervous system at roughly 30 times the potency of the "flagship" of its class, ketamine, and substitutes for phencyclidine in animal studies. K_{i} [^{3}H]TCP (Note: [^{3}H]N-[1-(2-thienyl)cyclohex-yl]piperidine) binding = 27 nM versus ketamine's K_{i} = 860 nM.

== See also ==
- Aptiganel
- Dizocilpine
- Fourphit
- Metaphit
- Selfotel
