= Ifenprodil =

Chemical compound

Clinical data
- Trade names: Cerocral, Dilvax, Vadilex
- Other names: NP-120; NP 120; NP120; RC 61-91
- Drug class: Cerebral vasodilators; NMDA receptor antagonists
- ATC code: C04AX28 (WHO)

Identifiers
- IUPAC name: 4-[2-(4-benzylpiperidin-1-yl)-1-hydroxypropyl]phenol
- CAS Number: 23210-56-2
- PubChem CID: 3689
- IUPHAR/BPS: 5472
- ChemSpider: 3561
- UNII: R8OE3P6O5S
- KEGG: D08064
- ChEBI: CHEBI:93829
- ChEMBL: ChEMBL305187
- CompTox Dashboard (EPA): DTXSID2045656
- ECHA InfoCard: 100.041.341

Chemical and physical data
- Formula: C_{21}H_{27}NO_{2}
- Molar mass: 325.452 g·mol^{−1}
- 3D model (JSmol): Interactive image
- SMILES: CC(C(C1=CC=C(C=C1)O)O)N2CCC(CC2)CC3=CC=CC=C3
- InChI: InChI=1S/C21H27NO2/c1-16(21(24)19-7-9-20(23)10-8-19)22-13-11-18(12-14-22)15-17-5-3-2-4-6-17/h2-10,16,18,21,23-24H,11-15H2,1H3; Key:UYNVMODNBIQBMV-UHFFFAOYSA-N

Ifenprodil, sold under the brand names Cerocral, Dilvax, and Vadilex, is a cerebral vasodilator that has been marketed in some countries, including in Japan, Hong Kong, and France. It is currently under development for treatment of a variety of additional indications.

Ifenprodil has multiple known pharmacological actions. It is an inhibitor of the NMDA receptor, specifically of NMDA receptors containing GluN1 and GluN2B subunits, the "ifenprodil binding site". Additionally, ifenprodil inhibits GIRK channels and interacts with α_{1}-adrenergic, serotonin, and sigma receptors.

Chemically, ifenprodil is a substituted phenethylamine and β-hydroxyamphetamine derivative. It is used pharmaceutically as the tartrate salt.

== Research ==
Ifenprodil has been studied as a possible medication to prevent tinnitus after acoustic trauma.

It is currently in phase II trials for cough and idiopathic pulmonary fibrosis, among other investigational uses.

== See also ==
- Traxoprodil (another β-hydroxyamphetamine NMDA receptor antagonist)
