= PEAQX =

Chemical compound

Clinical data
- Other names: PEAQX, NVP-AAM077

Identifiers
- IUPAC name: ({[(1S)-1-(4-bromophenyl)ethyl]amino}-(2,3-dioxo-1,4-dihydroquinoxalin-5-yl)methyl)phosphonic acid
- CAS Number: 459836-30-7
- PubChem CID: 9868551
- ChemSpider: 8044242
- UNII: LE8K7M4APN
- ChEMBL: ChEMBL273636

Chemical and physical data
- Formula: C_{17}H_{17}BrN_{3}O_{5}P
- Molar mass: 454.217 g·mol^{−1}
- 3D model (JSmol): Interactive image
- SMILES: C[C@@H](C1=CC=C(C=C1)Br)NC(C2=C3C(=CC=C2)N=C(C(=N3)O)O)P(=O)(O)O
- InChI: InChI=1S/C17H17BrN3O5P/c1-9(10-5-7-11(18)8-6-10)19-17(27(24,25)26)12-3-2-4-13-14(12)21-16(23)15(22)20-13/h2-9,17,19H,1H3,(H,20,22)(H,21,23)(H2,24,25,26)/t9-,17?/m0/s1; Key:XXZGNAZRWCBSBK-WFVOFKTRSA-N

PEAQX is a competitive antagonist at the NMDA receptor. Although originally described as 100-fold selective for GluN1/GluN2A receptors vs. GluN1/GluN2B receptors, more detailed studies of the Ki of PEAQX revealed it only shows a 5 fold difference in affinity for GluN1/GluN2A vs. GluN1/GluN2B receptors. It is also a potent anticonvulsant in animal tests.
