= EVT-101 =

Chemical compound

Clinical data
- Other names: ENS-101
- Drug class: NMDA receptor antagonist

Identifiers
- IUPAC name: 5-[3-(Difluoromethyl)-4-fluorophenyl]-3-[(2-methylimidazol-1-yl)methyl]pyridazine
- CAS Number: 627525-33-1 1166398-51-1 1189088-41-2 (HCl)
- PubChem CID: 22240172
- ChemSpider: 11255877
- UNII: 14DN1WB87S
- ChEMBL: ChEMBL3545350
- CompTox Dashboard (EPA): DTXSID101127745

Chemical and physical data
- Formula: C_{16}H_{13}F_{3}N_{4}
- Molar mass: 318.303 g·mol^{−1}
- 3D model (JSmol): Interactive image
- SMILES: CC1=NC=CN1CC2=NN=CC(=C2)C3=CC(=C(C=C3)F)C(F)F
- InChI: InChI=1S/C16H13F3N4/c1-10-20-4-5-23(10)9-13-6-12(8-21-22-13)11-2-3-15(17)14(7-11)16(18)19/h2-8,16H,9H2,1H3; Key:BOVUHBFXPNLTKF-UHFFFAOYSA-N

EVT-101, also known as ENS-101, is an experimental medication which originated from Roche and is under development by Evotec AG for the treatment of major depressive disorder. It acts as a selective NMDA receptor subunit 2B (NR2B) antagonist. The drug was first claimed by Roche in 2002. By 2017, EVT-101 was in phase II clinical trials for major depressive disorder; however, development of the drug was discontinued in 2021.

== See also ==
- List of investigational antidepressants
