= Eupenicillium shearii =

Species of fungus

Eupenicillium shearii is a fungus in the genus Penicillium. The type strain was first isolated in 1931 by Dr. Otto R. Reinking from a soil sample taken in Honduras. It has also been isolated from soil collected in the Democratic Republic of the Congo and near Abidjan. It was named and described in 1967.

E. shearii is of interest to medicinal chemists due to its production of kaitocephalin, a substance that may protect the brain and nervous system. Therefore, kaitocephalin is an attractive scaffold for drug development. Drugs based on this compound may be used to treat neurological conditions including Alzheimer’s, amyotrophic lateral sclerosis (ALS), and stroke.

== See also ==
- List of Penicillium species
