= 8A-PDHQ =

Chemical compound

Identifiers
- IUPAC name: 8a-phenyldecahydroquinoline
- CAS Number: 131556-11-1
- PubChem CID: 131397
- ChemSpider: 116144
- UNII: 8GBT78N4EC
- CompTox Dashboard (EPA): DTXSID40927262

Chemical and physical data
- Formula: C_{15}H_{21}N
- Molar mass: 215.340 g·mol^{−1}
- 3D model (JSmol): Interactive image
- SMILES: C1([C@]23CCCC[C@H]2CCCN3)=CC=CC=C1
- InChI: InChI=1S/C15H21N/c1-2-7-13(8-3-1)15-11-5-4-9-14(15)10-6-12-16-15/h1-3,7-8,14,16H,4-6,9-12H2; Key:QEXADSRMRUUCQJ-UHFFFAOYSA-N

8a-Phenyldecahydroquinoline (8A-PDHQ) is a high affinity NMDA antagonist developed by a team at Parke Davis in the 1950s. It is a structural analog of phencyclidine with slightly lower binding affinity than the parent compound. (−)-8a-Phenyldecahydroquinoline has an in vivo potency comparable to that of (+)-MK-801.
