= Nuclear calcium =

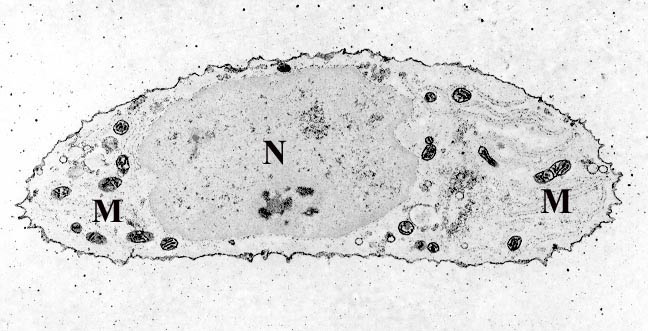
Transmission electron micrograph of calcium content in the nucleus (N) and mitochondria (M) of a chondrocyte

The concentration of calcium in the cell nucleus can increase in response to signals from the environment. Nuclear calcium is an evolutionary conserved potent regulator of gene expression that allows cells to undergo long-lasting adaptive responses. The 'Nuclear Calcium Hypothesis' by Hilmar Bading describes nuclear calcium in neurons as an important signaling end-point in synapse-to-nucleus communication that activates gene expression programs needed for persistent adaptations. In the nervous system, nuclear calcium is required for long-term memory formation, acquired neuroprotection, and the development of chronic inflammatory pain. In the heart, nuclear calcium is important for the development of cardiac hypertrophy. In the immune system, nuclear calcium is required for human T cell activation. Plants use nuclear calcium to control symbiosis signaling.
