= Hilmar Bading =

German physician and neuroscientist

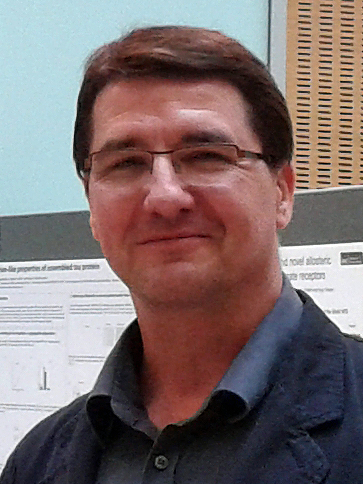
- Born: November 3, 1958 (age 67); Berlin, Germany
- Education: Ruprecht-Karls-University Heidelberg
- Scientific career
- Fields: Neurobiology, NMDA receptor and calcium signaling
- Workplaces: Ruprecht-Karls-University Heidelberg
- Academic advisors: Wilhelm Hasselbach, Karin Mölling, Michael E. Greenberg

Hilmar Bading (born 1958) is a German physician and neuroscientist. He is a member of the German National Academy of Science Leopoldina.

== Education and career ==
Hilmar Bading studied medicine from 1978 to 1984 at Heidelberg University (MD in 1984) and carried out his MD Thesis at the Max Planck Institute for Medical Research, Heidelberg on calcium transport ATPase in skeletal muscle. He received postdoctoral training at the Max Planck Institute for Molecular Genetics in Berlin, Germany (1985–1989) and at Harvard Medical School, Boston, US (1989–1993). From 1993 to 2001 he was a staff scientist at the MRC Laboratory of Molecular Biology, Cambridge, UK. Since 2001 he has been professor of neurobiology and director of the Neurobiology Institute and the Interdisciplinary Center for Neurosciences (IZN) at Heidelberg University.

He is co-founder of FundaMental Pharma GmbH, Heidelberg.

He founded the Foundation BrainAid.

== Research ==
Hilmar Bading's work is focused on neuronal calcium signaling and gene regulation in the nervous system. He identified calcium as the principal second messenger in the coupling of neuronal activity to gene expression and characterized the processes that mediate the dialogue between the synapse and the nucleus. His work highlighted the spatial aspects of calcium signals and in particular the importance of nuclear calcium in governing activity-dependent gene expression and adaptations in the nervous system that include memory formation and acquired neuroprotection. The discovery of toxic signaling by extrasynaptic NMDA receptors which antagonizes gene regulation by synaptic activity and causes neuronal dysfunction and cell death contributed to the understanding of neurodegenerative disorders including Huntington's disease, Alzheimer's disease, and amyotrophic lateral sclerosis (ALS).

Hilmar Bading and colleagues identified a signaling complex formed by extrasynaptic NMDA receptors (NMDARs) and TRPM4 that mediates excitotoxicity. They further described a class of neuroprotective small molecules, termed "NMDAR/TRPM4 interaction interface inhibitors" or "TwinF interface inhibitors", which disrupt the NMDAR/TRPM4 complex. In mouse disease models, these compounds were reported to protect against neurodegeneration and cell death associated with stroke, retinal ganglion cell degeneration, Huntington's disease, and Alzheimer's disease. The compounds are being further developed for the therapy of treatment-resistant depression by FundaMental Pharma GmbH, based in Heidelberg.

== Awards and honors ==
2001: Wolfgang-Paul Prize of the Alexander von Humboldt Foundation

2016: Innovation Prize of the German BioRegions

2019: Elected to the German National Academy of Science Leopoldina
