= 3-hydroxyanthranilate oxidase =

Class of enzymes

Identifiers
- EC no.: 1.10.3.5
- CAS no.: 37256-53-4

Databases
- IntEnz: IntEnz view
- BRENDA: BRENDA entry
- ExPASy: NiceZyme view
- KEGG: KEGG entry
- MetaCyc: metabolic pathway
- PRIAM: profile
- PDB structures: RCSB PDB PDBe PDBsum
- Gene Ontology: AmiGO / QuickGO
Search
- PMC: articles
- PubMed: articles
- NCBI: proteins

3-hydroxyanthranilate oxidase (EC 1.10.3.5) (also called 3-HAO) is an enzyme that catalyzes the chemical reaction:

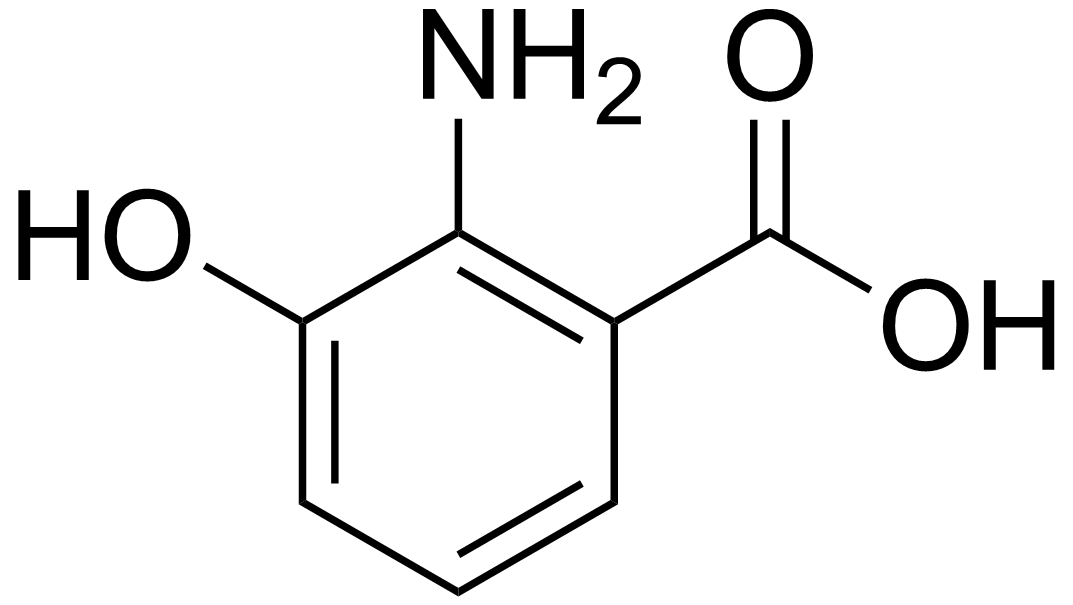
3-Hydroxyanthranilic acid
O_{2}
H_{2}O_{2}
6-imino-5-oxocyclohexa-1,3-dienecarboxylic acid

The two substrates of this enzyme are 3-hydroxyanthranilic acid and oxygen. Its products are 6-imino-5-oxocyclohexa-1,3-dienecarboxylic acid and hydrogen peroxide.

This enzyme belongs to the family of oxidoreductases, specifically those acting on diphenols and related substances as donor with oxygen as acceptor. The systematic name of this enzyme class is 3-hydroxyanthranilate:oxygen oxidoreductase. This enzyme is also called 3-hydroxyanthranilic acid oxidase.
