= Traxoprodil =

Chemical compound

Clinical data
- Other names: CP-101606; CP-98113
- ATC code: None

Identifiers
- IUPAC name: (1S,2S)-1-(4-hydroxyphenyl)-2-(4-hydroxy-4-phenylpiperidino)-1-propanol
- CAS Number: 134234-12-1 189894-57-3 (methanesulphonate)
- PubChem CID: 219101
- IUPHAR/BPS: 4163
- ChemSpider: 189919
- UNII: UTC046R5HM
- KEGG: D06204
- ChEMBL: ChEMBL17350
- CompTox Dashboard (EPA): DTXSID90158605
- ECHA InfoCard: 100.222.813

Chemical and physical data
- Formula: C_{20}H_{25}NO_{3}
- Molar mass: 327.424 g·mol^{−1}
- 3D model (JSmol): Interactive image
- SMILES: C[C@@H]([C@H](C1=CC=C(C=C1)O)O)N2CCC(CC2)(C3=CC=CC=C3)O
- InChI: InChI=1S/C20H25NO3/c1-15(19(23)16-7-9-18(22)10-8-16)21-13-11-20(24,12-14-21)17-5-3-2-4-6-17/h2-10,15,19,22-24H,11-14H2,1H3/t15-,19+/m0/s1; Key:QEMSVZNTSXPFJA-HNAYVOBHSA-N

Traxoprodil (developmental code name CP-101606) is a drug developed by Pfizer which acts as an NMDA antagonist, selective for the NR2B subunit. It has neuroprotective, analgesic, and anti-Parkinsonian effects in animal studies. Traxoprodil has been researched in humans as a potential treatment to lessen the damage to the brain after stroke, but results from clinical trials showed only modest benefit. The drug was found to cause EKG abnormalities (QT prolongation) and its clinical development was stopped. More recent animal studies have suggested traxoprodil may exhibit rapid-acting antidepressant effects similar to those of ketamine, although there is some evidence for similar psychoactive side effects and abuse potential at higher doses, which might limit clinical acceptance of traxoprodil for this application.

Traxoprodil showed ketamine-like rapidly-acting antidepressant effects in a small clinical trial of 30 patients with depression who were non-responders to 6 weeks of paroxetine treatment. The response rate was 60%, relative to 20% for placebo, and 33% of the participants met remission criteria by day five following a single administration. After one week, 78% of responders still showed an antidepressant response, and after 15 days, 42% did so. In the study, half of the participants had to have their dose lowered due to a high incidence of dissociative side effects at the higher doses. Development was stopped due to incidence of QTc prolongation. Other NR2B subunit-selective antagonists of the NMDA receptor are still under development for depression, such as rislenemdaz (CERC-301, MK-0657).

Chemically, traxoprodil is a substituted phenethylamine and β-hydroxyamphetamine derivative.

== See also ==
- List of investigational antidepressants
- Ifenprodil (another β-hydroxyamphetamine NMDA receptor antagonist)
