= Eliprodil =

Chemical compound

Clinical data
- ATC code: None

Identifiers
- IUPAC name: 1-(4-Chlorophenyl)-2-[4-[(4-fluorophenyl)methyl]piperidin-1-yl]ethanol
- CAS Number: 119431-25-3
- PubChem CID: 60703
- ChemSpider: 54708
- UNII: YW62A6TW29
- ChEBI: CHEBI:91784
- ChEMBL: ChEMBL28564
- CompTox Dashboard (EPA): DTXSID1045744
- ECHA InfoCard: 100.162.249

Chemical and physical data
- Formula: C_{20}H_{23}ClFNO
- Molar mass: 347.86 g·mol^{−1}
- 3D model (JSmol): Interactive image
- SMILES: C1CN(CCC1CC2=CC=C(C=C2)F)CC(C3=CC=C(C=C3)Cl)O
- InChI: InChI=1S/C20H23ClFNO/c21-18-5-3-17(4-6-18)20(24)14-23-11-9-16(10-12-23)13-15-1-7-19(22)8-2-15/h1-8,16,20,24H,9-14H2; Key:GGUSQTSTQSHJAH-UHFFFAOYSA-N

Eliprodil (codenamed SL-82.0715) is an NMDA antagonist drug candidate which selectively inhibits the NR2B (GLUN2B) subtype NMDA receptor at submicromolar concentrations. Eliprodil failed a Phase III clinical trial for the treatment of acute ischemic stroke in 1996, sponsored by Synthélabo Recherche.

NMDA receptors are a key component in mediating glutamate-induced excitotoxicity, and it is believed that NMDA antagonists would be neuroprotective after a stroke or other traumatic brain injury. After a traumatic brain injury, neurons become deprived of glucose and oxygen. These neurons quickly lose ATP and become depolarized, which releases glutamate. The extracellular buildup of glutamate triggers the overstimulation of AMPA and NMDA receptors. This, in turn, causes an influx of Na^{+} and Ca^{2+}. Therefore, when NMDA receptors are activated, there is an increase in intracellular Ca^{2+} concentration. High Ca^{2+} causes fatal metabolic consequences, including neuronal cell death.
