= GRIN2B =

Protein-coding gene in the species Homo sapiens

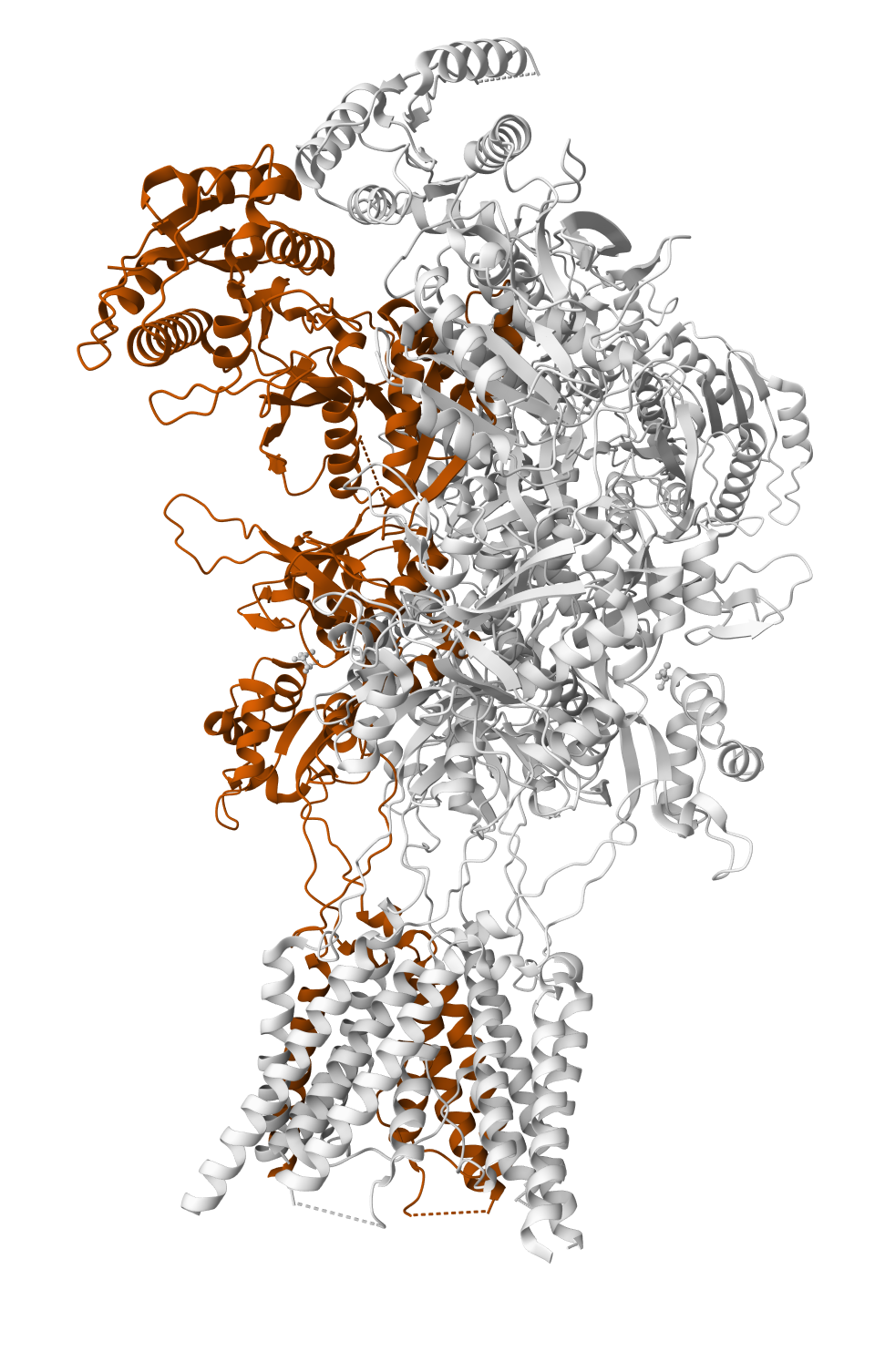

Identifiers
- Aliases: GRIN2B, GluN2B, MRD6, NMDAR2B, NR2B, hNR3, EIEE27, glutamate ionotropic receptor NMDA type subunit 2B, NR3, DEE27
- External IDs: OMIM: 138252; MGI: 95821; GeneCards: GRIN2B
Available structures
PDB	Ortholog search: PDBe RCSB
PDB	List of PDB id codes 5EWM, 5EWL, 5EWJ

Gene location (Human)
Chr.	Chromosome 12 (human)
Band	12p13.1	Start	13,437,942 bp
Band	12p13.1	End	13,982,002 bp

Gene location (Mouse)
Chr.	Chromosome 6 (mouse)
Band	6 G1|6 66.38 cM	Start	135,690,231 bp
Band	6 G1|6 66.38 cM	End	136,150,509 bp
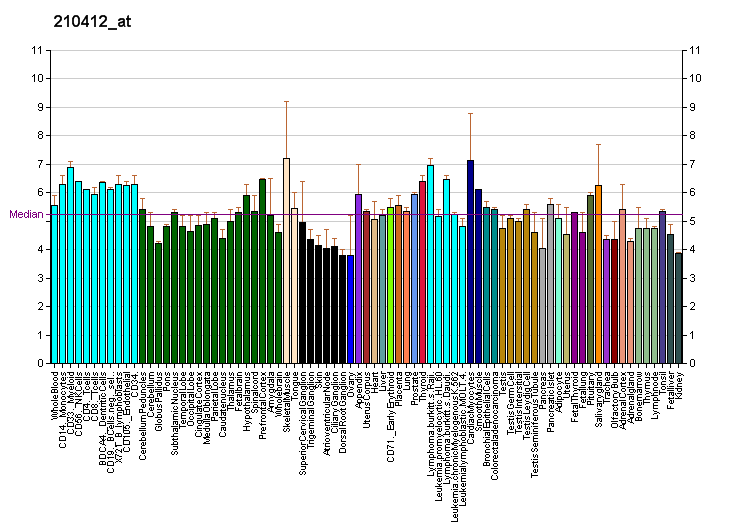

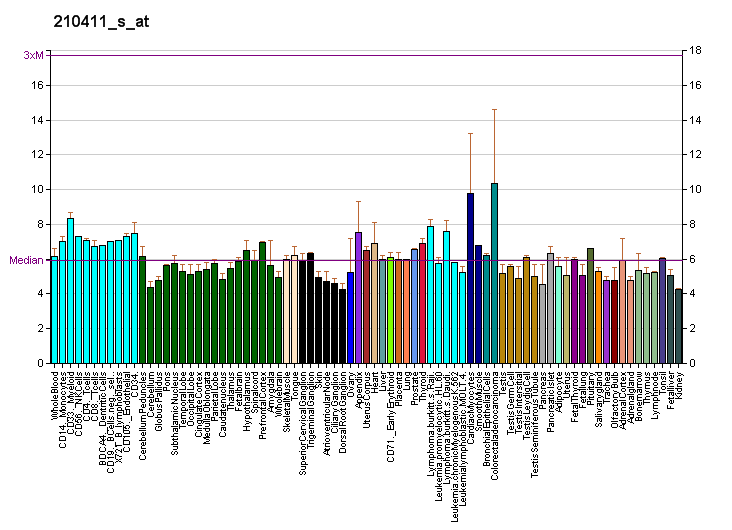
RNA expression pattern
Bgee	Human / Mouse (ortholog); Top expressed in: buccal mucosa cell; Brodmann area 23; sural nerve; middle temporal gyrus; primary visual cortex; corpus callosum; prefrontal cortex; nucleus accumbens; endothelial cell; dorsolateral prefrontal cortex / Top expressed in: lateral septal nucleus; olfactory tubercle; lateral geniculate nucleus; dentate gyrus of hippocampal formation granule cell; anterior amygdaloid area; superior frontal gyrus; subiculum; seminiferous tubule; nucleus accumbens; primary visual cortex; More reference expression data
BioGPS	More reference expression data
Gene ontology
Molecular function	zinc ion binding; glycine binding; metal ion binding; ion channel activity; protein binding; ionotropic glutamate receptor activity; extracellularly glutamate-gated ion channel activity; NMDA glutamate receptor activity; glutamate binding; glutamate-gated calcium ion channel activity; amyloid-beta binding; signaling receptor activity
Cellular component	integral component of membrane; postsynaptic membrane; membrane; synapse; NMDA selective glutamate receptor complex; cell surface; cell junction; neuron projection; intracellular anatomical structure; integral component of plasma membrane; postsynaptic density; plasma membrane; cytoplasm; synaptic membrane; postsynaptic density membrane
Biological process	glutamate receptor signaling pathway; ephrin receptor signaling pathway; ion transport; MAPK cascade; learning or memory; response to ethanol; chemical synaptic transmission; ionotropic glutamate receptor signaling pathway; excitatory postsynaptic potential; regulation of ion transmembrane transport; transport; calcium-mediated signaling; protein heterotetramerization; regulation of molecular function; calcium ion transmembrane import into cytosol; multicellular organism development; brain development; regulation of synaptic plasticity; long-term potentiation; excitatory chemical synaptic transmission; positive regulation of neuron death; negative regulation of dendritic spine maintenance; positive regulation of cysteine-type endopeptidase activity; regulation of NMDA receptor activity
Sources:Amigo / QuickGO
Orthologs
Databases	NCBI: entry; OMA: entry
Species	Human	Mouse
Entrez	2904	14812
Ensembl	ENSG00000273079	ENSMUSG00000030209
UniProt	Q13224	Q01097
RefSeq (mRNA)	NM_000834	NM_008171; NM_001363750
RefSeq (protein)	NP_000825	NP_032197; NP_001350679
Location (UCSC)	Chr 12: 13.44 – 13.98 Mb	Chr 6: 135.69 – 136.15 Mb
PubMed search
- Wikidata
View/Edit Human	View/Edit Mouse

Glutamate Receptor Ionotropic [NMDA] subunit epsilon-2, also known as N-methyl D-aspartate receptor subtype 2B (NMDAR2B or NR2B), is a protein that in humans is encoded by the GRIN2B gene.

== NMDA receptors ==
N-Methyl-D-aspartate (NMDA) receptors are a class of ionotropic glutamate receptors. The NMDA receptor channel has been shown to be involved in long-term potentiation, an activity-dependent increase in the efficiency of synaptic transmission thought to underlie certain kinds of memory and learning. NMDA receptor channels are heterotetramers composed of two molecules of the key receptor subunit NMDAR1 (GRIN1) and two drawn from one or more of the four NMDAR2 subunits: NMDAR2A (GRIN2A), NMDAR2B (GRIN2B), NMDAR2C (GRIN2C), and NMDAR2D (GRIN2D). The NR2 subunit acts as the agonist binding site for glutamate, one of the predominant excitatory neurotransmitter receptors in the mammalian brain.

== Function ==
NR2B has been associated with age- and visual-experience-dependent plasticity in the neocortex of rats, where an increased NR2B/NR2A ratio correlates directly with the stronger excitatory LTP in young animals. This is thought to contribute to experience-dependent refinement of developing cortical circuits.

Engineered to overexpress GRIN2B in their brains, mice and rats exhibit improved mental function. The "Doogie" mouse performed twice as well on one learning test.

== Ligands ==
- Besonprodil
- CERC-301, a selective NR2B receptor antagonist
- Eliprodil
- Ethanol - apparent induction of dephosphorylation of the NR2B Tyr1472 residue by STEP, leading to reduced receptor function
- Ifenprodil
- Rislenemdaz
- EVT-101, a selective NR2B receptor antagonist. This compound was tested as a potentially fast-acting antidepressant. In 2011 it was voluntarily withdrawn from a Phase II clinical study in treatment-resistant depression due to an unsatisfactory toxicity profile.
- Felbamate, an anticonvulsant that is also a positive allosteric modulator for the GABA_{A} receptor
- Ro-25-6981 (also known as MI-4), a selective NR2B receptor antagonist
- Traxoprodil, a selective NR2B receptor antagonist
- Toluene - noncompetitive antagonist

== Interactions ==
GRIN2B has been shown to interact with:

- Actinin, alpha 2,
- DLG2,
- DLG3,
- DLG4,
- EXOC4,
- LIN7B, and
- RICS.

== See also ==
- NMDA receptor
- Glutamate receptor
