= Lubeluzole =

Chemical compound

Clinical data
- ATC code: none

Identifiers
- IUPAC name: (2S)-1-[4-(1,3-Benzothiazol-2-yl-methylamino)piperidin-1-yl]-3-(3,4-difluorophenoxy)propan-2-ol
- CAS Number: 144665-07-6
- PubChem CID: 65998
- ChemSpider: 59390
- UNII: V2SIB71583
- KEGG: D04789
- ChEMBL: ChEMBL281724
- CompTox Dashboard (EPA): DTXSID60162779
- ECHA InfoCard: 100.233.379

Chemical and physical data
- Formula: C_{22}H_{25}F_{2}N_{3}O_{2}S
- Molar mass: 433.52 g·mol^{−1}
- 3D model (JSmol): Interactive image
- SMILES: CN(C1CCN(CC1)C[C@@H](COC2=CC(=C(C=C2)F)F)O)C3=NC4=CC=CC=C4S3
- InChI: InChI=1S/C22H25F2N3O2S/c1-26(22-25-20-4-2-3-5-21(20)30-22)15-8-10-27(11-9-15)13-16(28)14-29-17-6-7-18(23)19(24)12-17/h2-7,12,15-16,28H,8-11,13-14H2,1H3/t16-/m0/s1; Key:OZFSWVOEXHGDES-INIZCTEOSA-N

Lubeluzole (Prosynap) is a drug which acts as an indirect NMDA antagonist. It inhibits the release of glutamate, inhibits nitric oxide synthesis, and blocks calcium and sodium gated ion channels. It has neuroprotective effects particularly in hypoxic conditions, and was developed for the treatment of stroke. Trials showed it to be safe, effective and well tolerated at low doses, but higher doses produced the dangerous cardiac side effect of lengthening the QTc interval, which could potentially lead to heart failure, and so this meant that subsequent trials were limited to using only the low dose range. Animal studies had shown lubeluzole to produce neuroprotective effects when administered for prolonged periods, but the aim of its developers was to produce a drug that would be effective for preventing damage from acute stroke, and so ultimately it failed to show sufficient efficacy in trials and development for medical use was halted.
