= Green monkey (disambiguation) =

Green monkey may refer to

== Biology ==
- Green monkey (Chlorocebus sabaeus), also known as the Sabaeus monkey or the Callithrix monkey
  - Chlorocebus, sometimes called the African green monkey
- Green monkey disease, the Marburg virus disease

== Other ==
- Alphege, or the Green Monkey, fairy tale
- The Green Monkey, an American Thoroughbred racehorse
- Green Monkeys, team designation within the Legends of the Hidden Temple children's game show

== See also ==
- "Green Monkey Dreams", a 1996 short story by Isobelle Carmody
