= Excitotoxicity =

Process that kills nerve cells

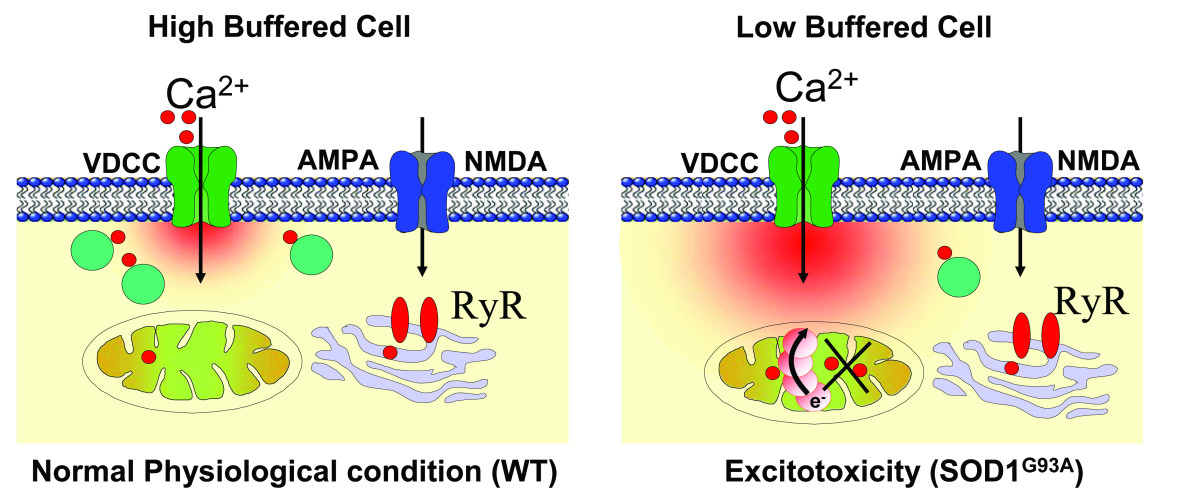
Low Ca^{2+} buffering and excitotoxicity under physiological stress and pathophysiological conditions in motor neuron (MNs). Low Ca^{2+} buffering in amyotrophic lateral sclerosis (ALS) vulnerable hypoglossal MNs exposes mitochondria to higher Ca^{2+} loads compared to highly buffered cells. Under normal physiological conditions, the neurotransmitter opens glutamate, NMDA and AMPA receptor channels, and voltage dependent Ca^{2+} channels (VDCC) with high glutamate release, which is taken up again by EAAT1 and EAAT2. This results in a small rise in intracellular calcium that can be buffered in the cell. In ALS, a disorder in the glutamate receptor channels leads to high calcium conductivity, resulting in high Ca^{2+} loads and increased risk for mitochondrial damage. This triggers the mitochondrial production of reactive oxygen species (ROS), which then inhibit glial EAAT2 function. This leads to further increases in the glutamate concentration at the synapse and further rises in postsynaptic calcium levels, contributing to the selective vulnerability of MNs in ALS. Jaiswal et al., 2009.

Excitotoxicity is when nerve cells suffer damage or death when the levels of otherwise necessary and safe neurotransmitters such as glutamate become pathologically high, resulting in excessive stimulation of receptors. For example, when glutamate receptors such as NMDA receptors or AMPA receptors encounter excessive levels of the excitatory neurotransmitter glutamate, significant neuronal damage might ensue. Different mechanisms might lead to increased extracellular glutamate concentrations, e.g. reduced uptake by glutamate transporters (EAATs), synaptic hyperactivity, or abnormal release from different neural cell types. Excess glutamate allows high levels of calcium ions (Ca^{2+}) to enter the cell. Ca^{2+} influx into cells activates a number of enzymes, including phospholipases, endonucleases, and proteases such as calpain. These enzymes go on to damage cell structures such as components of the cytoskeleton, membrane, and DNA. In evolved, complex adaptive systems such as biological life it must be understood that mechanisms are rarely, if ever, simplistically direct. For example, NMDA, in subtoxic amounts, can block glutamate toxicity and induce neuronal survival. In addition to abnormally high neurotransmitter concentrations, elevation of the extracellular potassium concentration, acidification and other mechanisms may contribute to excitotoxicity.

Excitotoxicity may be involved in cancers, spinal cord injury, status epilepticus, stroke, traumatic brain injury, hearing loss (through noise overexposure or ototoxicity), and in neurodegenerative diseases of the central nervous system such as multiple sclerosis, Alzheimer's disease, amyotrophic lateral sclerosis (ALS), Parkinson's disease, alcoholism, alcohol withdrawal or hyperammonemia and especially over-rapid benzodiazepine withdrawal, and also Huntington's disease. Other common conditions that cause excessive glutamate concentrations around neurons are hypoglycemia. Blood sugars are the primary energy source for glutamate removal from inter-synaptic spaces at the NMDA and AMPA receptor site. Patients should be given 5% glucose (dextrose) IV drip during excitotoxic shock to avoid a dangerous buildup of glutamate. When 5% glucose (dextrose) IV drip is not available high levels of fructose are given orally. Treatment is administered during the acute stages of excitotoxic shock along with glutamate receptor antagonists. Dehydration should be avoided as this also contributes to the concentrations of glutamate in the inter-synaptic cleft and "status epilepticus can also be triggered by a buildup of glutamate around inter-synaptic neurons."

== History ==
The harmful effects of glutamate on the central nervous system were first observed in 1954 by T. Hayashi, a Japanese scientist who stated that direct application of glutamate caused seizure activity, though this report went unnoticed for several years. D. R. Lucas and J. P. Newhouse, after noting that "single doses of [20–30 grams of sodium glutamate in humans] have ... been administered intravenously without permanent ill-effects", observed in 1957 that a subcutaneous dose described as "a little less than lethal", destroyed the neurons in the inner layers of the retina in newborn mice. In 1969, John Olney discovered that the phenomenon was not restricted to the retina, but occurred throughout the brain, and coined the term excitotoxicity. He also assessed that cell death was restricted to postsynaptic neurons, that glutamate agonists were as neurotoxic as their efficiency to activate glutamate receptors, and that glutamate antagonists could stop the neurotoxicity.

In 2002, Hilmar Bading and co-workers found that excitotoxicity is caused by the activation of NMDA receptors located outside synaptic contacts. The molecular basis for toxic extrasynaptic NMDA receptor signaling was uncovered in 2020 when Hilmar Bading and co-workers described a death signaling complex that consists of extrasynaptic NMDA receptor and TRPM4. Disruption of this complex using NMDAR/TRPM4 interface inhibitors (also known as 'interface inhibitors') renders extrasynaptic NMDA receptor non-toxic.

== Pathophysiology ==
Excitotoxicity can occur from substances produced within the body (endogenous excitotoxins). Glutamate is a prime example of an excitotoxin in the brain, and it is also the major excitatory neurotransmitter in the central nervous system of mammals. During normal conditions, glutamate concentration can be increased up to 1mM in the synaptic cleft, which is rapidly decreased in the lapse of milliseconds. When the glutamate concentration around the synaptic cleft cannot be decreased or reaches higher levels, the neuron kills itself by a process called apoptosis.

This pathologic phenomenon can also occur after brain injury and spinal cord injury. Within minutes after spinal cord injury, damaged neural cells within the lesion site spill glutamate into the extracellular space where glutamate can stimulate presynaptic glutamate receptors to enhance the release of additional glutamate. Brain trauma or stroke can cause ischemia, in which blood flow is reduced to inadequate levels. Ischemia is followed by accumulation of glutamate and aspartate in the extracellular fluid, causing cell death, which is aggravated by lack of oxygen and glucose. The biochemical cascade resulting from ischemia and involving excitotoxicity is called the ischemic cascade. Because of the events resulting from ischemia and glutamate receptor activation, a deep chemical coma may be induced in patients with brain injury to reduce the metabolic rate of the brain (its need for oxygen and glucose) and save energy to be used to remove glutamate actively. (The main aim in induced comas is to reduce the intracranial pressure, not brain metabolism).

Increased extracellular glutamate levels leads to the activation of Ca^{2+} permeable NMDA receptors on myelin sheaths and oligodendrocytes, leaving oligodendrocytes susceptible to Ca^{2+} influxes and subsequent excitotoxicity. One of the damaging results of excess calcium in the cytosol is initiating apoptosis through cleaved caspase processing. Another damaging result of excess calcium in the cytosol is the opening of the mitochondrial permeability transition pore, a pore in the membranes of mitochondria that opens when the organelles absorb too much calcium. Opening of the pore may cause mitochondria to swell and release reactive oxygen species and other proteins that can lead to apoptosis. The pore can also cause mitochondria to release more calcium. In addition, production of adenosine triphosphate (ATP) may be stopped, and ATP synthase may in fact begin hydrolysing ATP instead of producing it, which is suggested to be involved in depression.

Inadequate ATP production resulting from brain trauma can eliminate electrochemical gradients of certain ions. Glutamate transporters require the maintenance of these ion gradients to remove glutamate from the extracellular space. The loss of ion gradients results in not only the halting of glutamate uptake, but also in the reversal of the transporters. The Na^{+}-glutamate transporters on neurons and astrocytes can reverse their glutamate transport and start secreting glutamate at a concentration capable of inducing excitotoxicity. This results in a buildup of glutamate and further damaging activation of glutamate receptors.

On the molecular level, calcium influx is not the only factor responsible for apoptosis induced by excitoxicity. Recently, it has been noted that extrasynaptic NMDA receptor activation, triggered by both glutamate exposure or hypoxic/ischemic conditions, activate a CREB (cAMP response element binding) protein shut-off, which in turn caused loss of mitochondrial membrane potential and apoptosis. On the other hand, activation of synaptic NMDA receptors activated only the CREB pathway, which activates BDNF (brain-derived neurotrophic factor), not activating apoptosis.

=== Exogenous excitotoxins ===
Exogenous excitotoxins refer to neurotoxins that also act at postsynaptic cells but are not normally found in the body. These toxins may enter the body of an organism from the environment through wounds, food intake, aerial dispersion etc. Common excitotoxins include glutamate analogs that mimic the action of glutamate at glutamate receptors, including AMPA and NMDA receptors.

=== BMAA ===
The L-alanine derivative β-methylamino-L-alanine (BMAA) has long been identified as a neurotoxin which was first associated with the amyotrophic lateral sclerosis/parkinsonism–dementia complex (Lytico-bodig disease) in the Chamorro people of Guam. The widespread occurrence of BMAA can be attributed to cyanobacteria which produce BMAA as a result of complex reactions under nitrogen stress. Following research, excitotoxicity appears to be the likely mode of action for BMAA which acts as a glutamate agonist, activating AMPA and NMDA receptors and causing damage to cells even at relatively low concentrations of 10 μM. The subsequent uncontrolled influx of Ca^{2+} then leads to the pathophysiology described above. Further evidence of the role of BMAA as an excitotoxin is rooted in the ability of NMDA antagonists like MK801 to block the action of BMAA. More recently, evidence has been found that BMAA is misincorporated in place of L-serine in human proteins. A considerable portion of the research relating to the toxicity of BMAA has been conducted on rodents. A study published in 2016 with green monkeys (Chlorocebus sabaeus) in St. Kitts, which are homozygous for the apoE4 (APOE-ε4) allele (a condition which in humans is a risk factor for Alzheimer's disease), found that orally administered BMAA developed hallmark histopathology features of Alzheimer's Disease including amyloid beta plaques and neurofibrillary tangle accumulation. Subjects in the trial fed smaller doses of BMAA were found to have correlative decreases in these pathology features. This study demonstrates that BMAA, an environmental toxin, can trigger neurodegenerative disease as a result of a gene/environment interaction. While BMAA has been detected in brain tissue of deceased ALS/PDC patients, further insight is required to trace neurodegenerative pathology in humans to BMAA.

== See also ==
- Glutamate (neurotransmitter)
- Glutamic acid (flavor)
- NMDA receptor antagonist
- Dihydropyridine
