= Neramexane =

Chemical compound

Clinical data
- ATC code: none

Identifiers
- IUPAC name: 1,3,3,5,5-pentamethylcyclohexanamine
- CAS Number: 219810-59-0
- PubChem CID: 6433106
- ChemSpider: 4938294
- UNII: 856DX0KJ84
- CompTox Dashboard (EPA): DTXSID40176399
- ECHA InfoCard: 100.107.752

Chemical and physical data
- Formula: C_{11}H_{23}N
- Molar mass: 169.312 g·mol^{−1}
- 3D model (JSmol): Interactive image
- SMILES: C1(C)(N)CC(C)(C)CC(C)(C)C1
- InChI: InChI=1S/C11H23N/c1-9(2)6-10(3,4)8-11(5,12)7-9/h6-8,12H2,1-5H3; Key:OGZQTTHDGQBLBT-UHFFFAOYSA-N

Neramexane is a drug related to memantine, which acts as an NMDA antagonist and has neuroprotective effects. It is being developed for various possible applications, including treatment of tinnitus, Alzheimer's disease, drug addiction and as an analgesic. Animal studies have also suggested antidepressant and nootropic actions so that this drug may be used for a wide range of potential applications. It also acts as a nicotinic acetylcholine receptor antagonist.

A clinical trial found that doses of 50 mg and above safely improved tinnitus scores over 16 weeks.

== See also ==
- Arylcyclohexylamine
