= Extrasynaptic NMDA receptor =

Hilmar Bading and colleagues uncovered that extrasynaptic NMDA receptors form a signaling complex with the transient receptor potential cation channel subfamily M member 4 (TRPM4). The NMDAR/TRPM4 complex is considered central to glutamate excitotoxicity. NMDAR/TRPM4 interaction interface inhibitors (also known as 'TwinF interface inhibitors') disrupt the NMDAR/TRPM4 complex thereby detoxifying extrasynaptic NMDA receptors. In mouse disease models, TwinF interface inhibitors protect against stroke induced brain damage, retinal ganglion cell degeneration, amyotrophic lateral sclerosis (ALS), Huntington's disease, Alzheimer's disease, and demonstrate antidepressant efficacy in treatment-resistant depression.
