= Selfotel =

Chemical compound

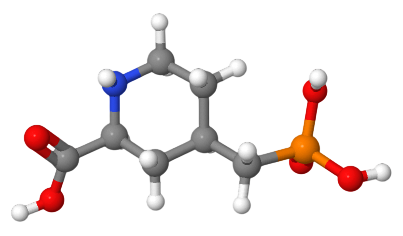

Clinical data
- Other names: Selfotel

Legal status
- Legal status: In general: legal

Identifiers
- IUPAC name: (2S,4R)-4-(phosphonomethyl)piperidine-2-carboxylic acid
- CAS Number: 110347-85-8
- PubChem CID: 68736
- IUPHAR/BPS: 4155
- ChemSpider: 61982
- UNII: 4VGJ4A41L2
- KEGG: D02410
- ChEMBL: ChEMBL39664
- CompTox Dashboard (EPA): DTXSID5045675

Chemical and physical data
- Formula: C_{7}H_{14}NO_{5}P
- Molar mass: 223.165 g·mol^{−1}
- 3D model (JSmol): Interactive image
- SMILES: C1CN[C@@H](C[C@@H]1CP(=O)(O)O)C(=O)O
- InChI: InChI=1S/C7H14NO5P/c9-7(10)6-3-5(1-2-8-6)4-14(11,12)13/h5-6,8H,1-4H2,(H,9,10)(H2,11,12,13)/t5-,6+/m1/s1; Key:LPMRCCNDNGONCD-RITPCOANSA-N

Selfotel (CGS-19755) is a drug which acts as a competitive NMDA antagonist, directly competing with glutamate for binding to the receptor. Initial studies showed it to have anticonvulsant, anxiolytic, analgesic and neuroprotective effects, and it was originally researched for the treatment of stroke, but subsequent animal and human studies showed phencyclidine-like effects, as well as limited efficacy and evidence for possible neurotoxicity under some conditions, and so clinical development was ultimately discontinued.
