= 3-Me-PCE =

New Psychoactive Substance Dissociative Eticyclidine Derivative

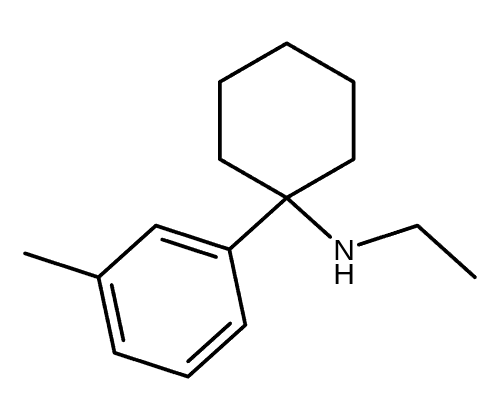

Legal status
- Legal status: DE: NpSG (Industrial and scientific use only)

Identifiers
- IUPAC name: N-Ethyl-1-(3-methylphenyl)cyclohexanamine
- CAS Number: 2201-64-1
- PubChem CID: 154133693
- ChemSpider: 74893746
- CompTox Dashboard (EPA): DTXSID501343119

Chemical and physical data
- 3D model (JSmol): Interactive image
- SMILES: CCNC1(CCCCC1)c2cc(C)ccc2
- InChI: InChI=1S/C15H23N/c1-3-16-15(10-5-4-6-11-15)14-9-7-8-13(2)12-14/h7-9,12,16H,3-6,10-11H2,1-2H3; Key:USOQORZXGGZQGO-UHFFFAOYSA-N

3-Me-PCE is the 3-methyl derivative of the internationally controlled substance Eticyclidine (PCE). It shares structural similarities with 3-MeO-PCE and 3-HO-PCE. 3-Me-PCE first appeared in the scientific literature in 2015 in the context of synthesis and analytical caracterization of a series of arylcyclohexylamines by Wallach et al. It is believed to produce ketamine-like dissociative effects predominantly via antagonism of NMDA receptors. The EUDA issued a notification of its first analytical identification in March 2024.

== See also ==
- 3-Methyl-PCP
- 3-Methyl-PCPy
- Deoxymethoxetamine
