= 2-Oxo-PCE =

Chemical compound

Legal status
- Legal status: CA: Schedule I; DE: NpSG (Industrial and scientific use only); UK: Class B; Illegal in Hong Kong and Sweden

Identifiers
- IUPAC name: 2-(ethylamino)-2-phenyl-cyclohexanone
- CAS Number: 6740-82-5; hydrochloride: 4551-92-2
- PubChem CID: 132989542
- ChemSpider: 76590394
- UNII: 2TRF16U3MR; hydrochloride: 6Q4N3KH3MG

Chemical and physical data
- Formula: C_{14}H_{19}NO
- Molar mass: 217.312 g·mol^{−1}
- 3D model (JSmol): Interactive image
- SMILES: CCNC1(CCCCC1=O)C2=CC=CC=C2
- InChI: InChI=1S/C14H19NO/c1-2-15-14(11-7-6-10-13(14)16)12-8-4-3-5-9-12/h3-5,8-9,15H,2,6-7,10-11H2,1H3; Key:IDLSBAANXISGEI-UHFFFAOYSA-N

2-Oxo-PCE (also known as N-ethyldeschloroketamine, eticyclidone and O-PCE) is a dissociative anesthetic of the arylcyclohexylamine class that is closely related to deschloroketamine and eticyclidine, and has been sold online as a designer drug.

== See also ==
- 3-HO-PCE
- 3-Chloro-PCP
- 4-Keto-PCP
- Deoxymethoxetamine
- MXiPr
- Isoethcathinone
