= 3-MeO-PCMo =

Chemical compound

Legal status
- Legal status: CA: Schedule I; DE: NpSG (Industrial and scientific use only); UK: Under Psychoactive Substances Act

Identifiers
- IUPAC name: 4-[1-(3-methoxyphenyl)cyclohexyl]morpholine
- CAS Number: 138873-80-0
- PubChem CID: 132605908
- ChemSpider: 58191437
- UNII: 96QW73BA62
- CompTox Dashboard (EPA): DTXSID201032507

Chemical and physical data
- Formula: C_{17}H_{25}NO_{2}
- Molar mass: 275.392 g·mol^{−1}
- 3D model (JSmol): Interactive image
- SMILES: COC1=CC(C2(N3CCOCC3)CCCCC2)=CC=C1
- InChI: InChI=1S/C17H25NO2/c1-19-16-7-5-6-15(14-16)17(8-3-2-4-9-17)18-10-12-20-13-11-18/h5-7,14H,2-4,8-13H2,1H3; Key:BOGOEDFWPOXWQE-UHFFFAOYSA-N

3-MeO-PCMo is a dissociative anesthetic drug which is similar in structure to phencyclidine and has been sold online as a designer drug. It has been shown to have reinforcing effects in animal studies, although human data is limited.

== Pharmacology ==
3-MeO-PCMo acts as an NMDA antagonist with an IC_{50} of 26.67 μM, with the value for PCP being 2.02 μM.

== See also ==
- Arylcyclohexylamine
- Ketamine
- 3-HO-PCE
- 3-MeO-PCE
- 3-HO-PCP
- 3-MeO-PCP
- 4-MeO-PCP
- Methoxyketamine
