= Hydroxetamine =

Chemical compound

Legal status
- Legal status: CA: HXE is not specifically scheduled but ketamine and its analogues are schedule I; DE: NpSG (Industrial and scientific use only); UK: Class B

Identifiers
- IUPAC name: 2-(ethylamino)-2-(3-hydroxyphenyl)cyclohexan-1-one
- CAS Number: 1620054-73-0
- PubChem CID: 163192347
- ChemSpider: 112747181
- UNII: JQ2YE6NTZ8
- CompTox Dashboard (EPA): DTXSID001336931

Chemical and physical data
- Formula: C_{14}H_{19}NO_{2}
- Molar mass: 233.311 g·mol^{−1}
- 3D model (JSmol): Interactive image
- SMILES: O=C1CCCCC1(NCC)C2=CC(O)=CC=C2
- InChI: InChI=1S/C14H19NO2/c1-2-15-14(9-4-3-8-13(14)17)11-6-5-7-12(16)10-11/h5-7,10,15-16H,2-4,8-9H2,1H3; Key:CQERUJSORROCGH-UHFFFAOYSA-N

Hydroxetamine (3'-hydroxy-2-oxo-PCE, O-desmethylmethoxetamine, HXE) is a recreational designer drug from the arylcyclohexylamine family, with dissociative effects. It is known as an active metabolite of the dissociative designer drug methoxetamine, but has also been sold in its own right since late 2019.

== See also ==
- 3-HO-PCP
- 4-Keto-PCP
- Desmetramadol
- Deoxymethoxetamine
- Fluorexetamine
