= TCTHP =

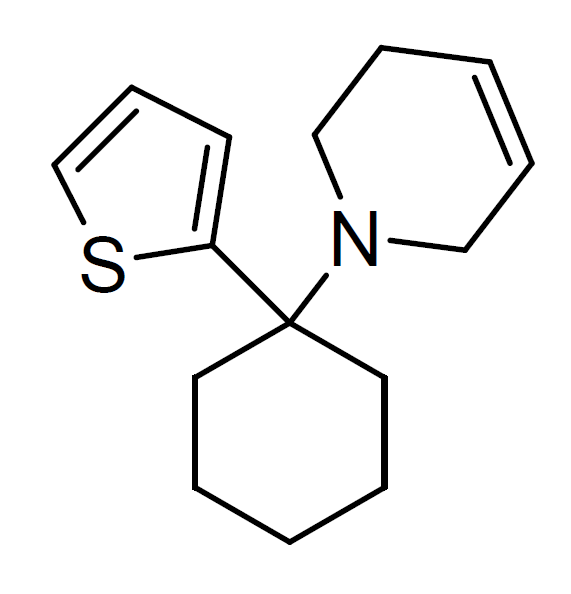

Identifiers
- IUPAC name: 1,2,3,6-tetrahydro-1-[1-(2-thienyl)cyclohexyl]pyridine
- CAS Number: 111318-13-9
- PubChem CID: 399892
- ChemSpider: 354431
- ChEMBL: ChEMBL307113
- CompTox Dashboard (EPA): DTXSID601345887

Chemical and physical data
- Formula: C_{15}H_{21}NS
- Molar mass: 247.40 g·mol^{−1}
- 3D model (JSmol): Interactive image
- SMILES: C1CCC(CC1)(C2=CC=CS2)N3CCC=CC3
- InChI: InChI=1S/C15H21NS/c1-3-9-15(10-4-1,14-8-7-13-17-14)16-11-5-2-6-12-16/h2,5,7-8,13H,1,3-4,6,9-12H2; Key:NDTNWLZCHFUWIS-UHFFFAOYSA-N

TCTHP is a designer drug from the arylcyclohexylamine family, which has dissociative-like effects in animal studies. It is an analogue of tenocyclidine where the piperidine ring has been replaced by an unsaturated 1,2,3,6-tetrahydropyridine ring. Similarly to tenocyclidine itself and other related compounds such as ketamine and phencyclidine, TCTHP acts as an NMDA antagonist. While NMDA antagonists can be neurotoxic at high doses, they can also be neuroprotective under certain conditions, particularly in preventing death of brain tissue following conditions of transient hypoxia such as those which may occur when the supply of oxygenated blood to the brain is cut off following medical events such as stroke or heart attack. TCTHP and related compounds were developed in an attempt to exploit this property and develop potential medications for the alleviation of brain injury following transient hypoxic events, and show neuroprotective effects against hypoxic brain injury in animal models.
