= Methoxpropamine =

Chemical compound

Legal status
- Legal status: CA: Schedule I; DE: NpSG (Industrial and scientific use only); UK: Class B

Identifiers
- IUPAC name: 2-(3-Methoxyphenyl)-2-(propylamino)cyclohexanone
- CAS Number: 2504100-71-2
- PubChem CID: 155817932
- ChemSpider: 128909942
- UNII: LTF83AU3X8
- CompTox Dashboard (EPA): DTXSID501336500

Chemical and physical data
- Formula: C_{16}H_{23}NO_{2}
- Molar mass: 261.365 g·mol^{−1}
- 3D model (JSmol): Interactive image
- SMILES: COc1cccc(c1)C2(NCCC)CCCCC2=O
- InChI: InChI=1S/C16H23NO2/c1-3-11-17-16(10-5-4-9-15(16)18)13-7-6-8-14(12-13)19-2/h6-8,12,17H,3-5,9-11H2,1-2H3; Key:AAVOSBAXDRASAH-UHFFFAOYSA-N

Methoxpropamine (MXPr, 2-Oxo-3'-methoxy-PCPr) is a dissociative anesthetic drug of the arylcyclohexylamine class and NMDA receptor antagonist that is closely related to substances such as methoxetamine and PCPr. It has been sold online as a designer drug, first being identified in Denmark in October 2019, and is illegal in Finland.

== See also ==
- Methoxmetamine
- Methoxyketamine
- MXiPr
- SN 35210
