= Methoxisopropamine =

Chemical compound

MXiPr

Legal status
- Legal status: CA: Schedule I; DE: NpSG (Industrial and scientific use only); UK: Class B

Identifiers
- IUPAC name: 2-(isopropylamino)-2-(3-methoxyphenyl)cyclohexan-1-one
- CAS Number: 2666932-55-2
- PubChem CID: 163192824
- ChemSpider: 129433717
- UNII: KHM3GXB3S9
- CompTox Dashboard (EPA): DTXSID101336877

Chemical and physical data
- Formula: C_{16}H_{23}NO_{2}
- Molar mass: 261.365 g·mol^{−1}
- 3D model (JSmol): Interactive image
- SMILES: CC(C)NC1(CCCCC1=O)c1cccc(OC)c1
- InChI: InChI=1S/C16H23NO2/c1-12(2)17-16(10-5-4-9-15(16)18)13-7-6-8-14(11-13)19-3/h6-8,11-12,17H,4-5,9-10H2,1-3H3; Key:FTQIVDGNGXPEKP-UHFFFAOYSA-N

MXiPr (Methoxisopropamine, Isopropyloxetamine, Isopropyxetamine) is a recreational designer drug with dissociative effects. It is an arylcyclohexylamine derivative, related to drugs such as ketamine and methoxetamine. It is the N-isopropyl homologue to methoxetamine. Since it hasn't been extensively studied, the pharmacological effects are unclear, but its effects are reportedly similar to methoxetamine. It was first identified in Slovenia in December 2020, and was made illegal in Hungary in April 2021.

== See also ==
- 3-Methyl-PCP
- Deoxymethoxetamine
- Fluorexetamine
- MDPCP
- Methoxpropamine
- O-PCE
- Ketamine
