= 3-Methyl-PCPy =

Chemical compound

3-Me-PCPy

Clinical data
- ATC code: None

Legal status
- Legal status: CA: Schedule I; DE: NpSG (Industrial and scientific use only); UK: Class B

Identifiers
- IUPAC name: 1-[1-(3-methylphenyl)cyclohexyl]pyrrolidine
- CAS Number: 1622348-63-3
- PubChem CID: 137332188
- ChemSpider: 129433265
- UNII: FS9Z5C7CQ5
- CompTox Dashboard (EPA): DTXSID201337066

Chemical and physical data
- Formula: C_{17}H_{25}N
- Molar mass: 243.394 g·mol^{−1}
- 3D model (JSmol): Interactive image
- SMILES: CC1=CC(=CC=C1)C2(CCCCC2)N3CCCC3
- InChI: InChI=1S/C17H25N/c1-15-8-7-9-16(14-15)17(10-3-2-4-11-17)18-12-5-6-13-18/h7-9,14H,2-6,10-13H2,1H3; Key:JZVMREFYFTZXGN-UHFFFAOYSA-N

3-Methyl-PCPy (3-Me-PCPy) is an arylcyclohexylamine derivative with an unusual spectrum of pharmacological effects, acting as both a potent NMDA antagonist and also a triple reuptake inhibitor which inhibits reuptake of all three monoamine neurotransmitters serotonin, dopamine and noradrenaline. It also acts as a high affinity sigma receptor ligand, selective for the σ_{2} subtype. It produces both stimulant and dissociative effects in animal behavioural studies.

== Pharmacology ==
In in vitro binding assays, 3-Me-PCPy displays high affinities across monoamine reuptake transporters alongside the NMDA receptor complex. Unusually for an arylcyclohexylamine dissociative, its affinity for the serotonin transporter (SERT) is approximately ten-fold higher than its affinity for the NMDA receptor pore.

Binding affinities of 3-Me-PCPy (Wallach & Brandt, 2018)
Target site	Assay / Site	K_{i} (nM)
Serotonin transporter (SERT)	Monoamine reuptake	5.6
Dopamine transporter (DAT)	Monoamine reuptake	39.0
Norepinephrine transporter (NET)	Monoamine reuptake	45.0
NMDA receptor	Dizocilpine (MK-801) site	52.3

== Legal Status ==
3-Methyl-PCPy is covered by drug analogue laws in various jurisdictions (UK, Germany, Japan, Australia etc.) as a generic arylcyclohexylamine derivative, and a structural isomer of phencyclidine.

== See also ==
- 3-Methyl-PCP
- 3-HO-PCE
- BTCP
- Deoxymethoxetamine
- Ephenidine
- MDPCP
