= 3-Methyl-PCP =

Chemical compound

3'-Me-PCP

Legal status
- Legal status: CA: Schedule I; DE: NpSG (Industrial and scientific use only); UK: Class B

Identifiers
- IUPAC name: 1-[1-(3-methylphenyl)cyclohexyl]piperidine
- CAS Number: 2201-30-1
- PubChem CID: 611899
- ChemSpider: 531905
- UNII: Y9XHS38QLZ
- CompTox Dashboard (EPA): DTXSID801336878

Chemical and physical data
- Formula: C_{18}H_{27}N
- Molar mass: 257.421 g·mol^{−1}
- 3D model (JSmol): Interactive image
- SMILES: CC1=CC(=CC=C1)C2(CCCCC2)N3CCCCC3
- InChI: InChI=1S/C18H27N/c1-16-9-8-10-17(15-16)18(11-4-2-5-12-18)19-13-6-3-7-14-19/h8-10,15H,2-7,11-14H2,1H3; Key:BMFKUCGCXMDGBK-UHFFFAOYSA-N

3-Methyl-PCP (3'-Methyl-PCP, meta-Methyl-PCP, 3-Me-PCP) is a recreational designer drug with dissociative effects. It is an arylcyclohexylamine derivative, related to drugs such as 3'-MeO-PCP and 3'-Me-PCPy. It was first synthesised in the 1960s, but was only identified on the illicit market in Hungary in September 2020, and was made illegal in Hungary in April 2021.

== See also ==
- 3-Cl-PCP
- 3-HO-PCP
- 3-F-PCP
- Deoxymethoxetamine
- MXiPr
