= Dieticyclidine =

Chemical compound

Clinical data
- ATC code: none

Legal status
- Legal status: CA: Schedule I; UK: Class B

Identifiers
- IUPAC name: N,N-diethyl-1-phenylcyclohexan-1-amine
- CAS Number: 2201-19-6
- PubChem CID: 604690
- ChemSpider: 525655
- UNII: 8JY6P22UVD
- CompTox Dashboard (EPA): DTXSID00944617

Chemical and physical data
- Formula: C_{16}H_{25}N
- Molar mass: 231.383 g·mol^{−1}
- 3D model (JSmol): Interactive image
- SMILES: CCN(CC)C1(CCCCC1)C2=CC=CC=C2
- InChI: InChI=1S/C16H25N/c1-3-17(4-2)16(13-9-6-10-14-16)15-11-7-5-8-12-15/h5,7-8,11-12H,3-4,6,9-10,13-14H2,1-2H3; Key:GRHWLIMQOFAGHA-UHFFFAOYSA-N

Dieticyclidine (PCDE), or diethylphenylcyclohexylamine, is a psychoactive drug and research chemical of the arylcyclohexylamine chemical class related to phencyclidine (PCP) and eticyclidine (PCE). It acts as an NMDA receptor antagonist but has low potency and acts mainly as a prodrug for eticyclidine.
