= Arylcyclohexylamine =

Class of chemical compounds

Phencyclidine, the prototypical arylcyclohexylamine derivative.

Arylcyclohexylamines, also known as arylcyclohexamines or arylcyclohexanamines, are a chemical class of pharmaceutical, designer, and experimental drugs.

== History ==
Phencyclidine (PCP) is believed to be the first arylcyclohexylamine with recognized anesthetic properties, but several arylcyclohexylamines were described before PCP in the scientific literature, beginning with PCA (1-phenylcyclohexan-1-amine) the synthesis of which was first published in 1907. PCP itself was discovered in 1926 but not researched by the pharmaceutical industry until the 1950s. PCE was reported in 1953 and PCMo (4-(1-phenyl-cyclohexyl)-morpholine see chart below for figure) in 1954, with PCMo described as a potent sedative. Arylcyclohexylamine anesthetics were intensively investigated at Parke-Davis, beginning with the 1956 studies of PCP and later the related compound ketamine. The 1970s saw the debut of these compounds, especially PCP and its analogues, as illicitly used recreational drugs due to their dissociative hallucinogenic and euphoriant effects. Since that time, the class has been expanded by scientific research into stimulant, analgesic, and neuroprotective agents, and also by clandestine chemists in search of novel recreational drugs.

== Structure ==
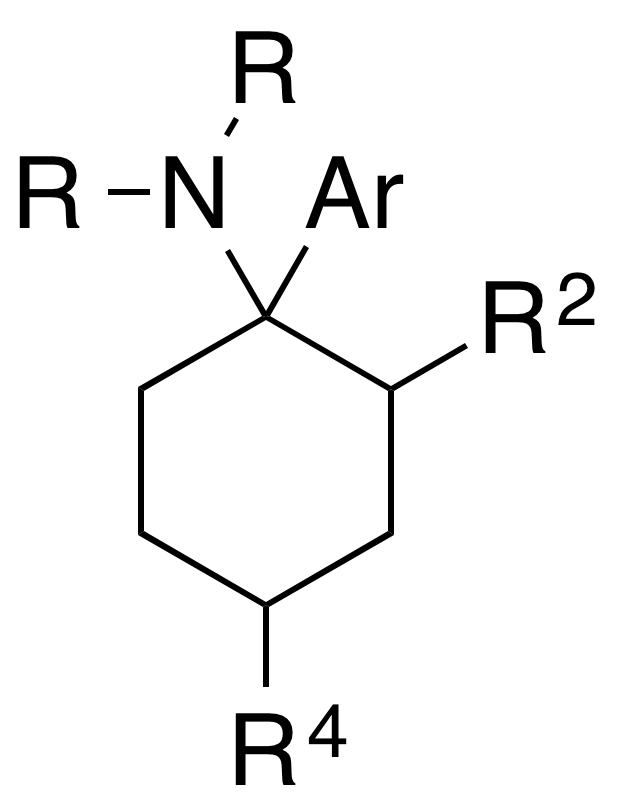
General structure of arylcyclohexylamines

An arylcyclohexylamine is composed of a cyclohexylamine unit with an aryl moiety attachment. The aryl group is positioned geminal to the amine. In the simplest cases, the aryl moiety is typically a phenyl ring, sometimes with additional substitution. The amine is usually not primary; secondary amines such as methylamine or ethylamine, or tertiary cycloalkylamines such as piperidine and pyrrolidine, are the most commonly encountered N-substituents.

== Pharmacology ==
Arylcyclohexylamines varyingly possess NMDA receptor antagonistic, dopamine reuptake inhibitory, and μ-opioid receptor agonistic properties. Additionally, σ receptor agonistic, nACh receptor antagonistic, and D_{2} receptor agonistic actions have been reported for some of these agents. Antagonism of the NMDA receptor confers anesthetic, anticonvulsant, neuroprotective, and dissociative effects; blockade of the dopamine transporter mediates stimulant and euphoriant effects as well as psychosis in high amounts; and activation of the μ-opioid receptor causes analgesic and euphoriant effects. Stimulation of the σ and D_{2} receptors may also contribute to hallucinogenic and psychotomimetic effects.

These are versatile agents with a wide range of possible pharmacological activities depending on the extent and range to which chemical modifications are implemented. The various choice of substitutions that are made allows for "fine-tuning" of the pharmacological profile that results. As examples, BTCP is a selective dopamine reuptake inhibitor, PCP is primarily an NMDA antagonist, and BDPC is a potent μ-opioid agonist, while PRE-084 is a selective sigma receptor agonist. Thus, radically different pharmacology is possible through different structural combinations.

== Notes on numbering ==
PCP itself is composed of three six-membered rings, which can each be substituted by a variety of groups. These are traditionally numbered in the older research as first the cyclohexyl ring, then the phenyl, and finally the piperidine ring, with the different rings represented by prime notation (') next to the number. For instance, 4-methyl-PCP, 4'-methyl-PCP and 4''-methyl-PCP are all known compounds, with similar activity but quite different potencies.

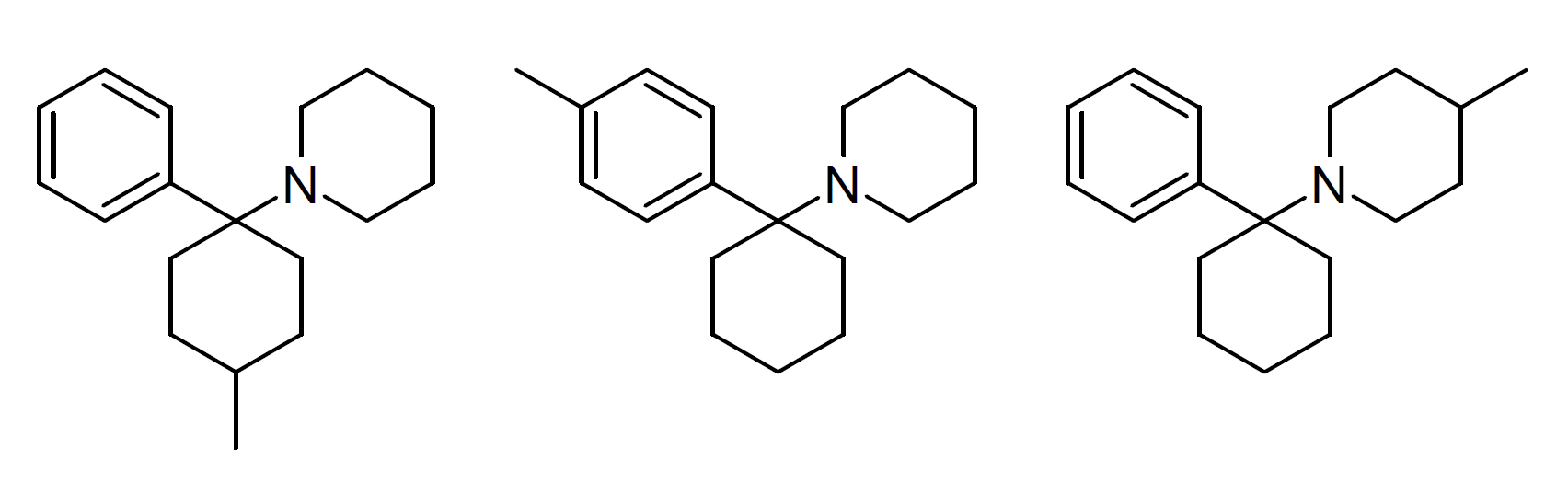
4-Methyl-PCP, 4'-Methyl-PCP and 4''-Methyl-PCP (left to right)

However, since the widespread sale of these compounds as grey-market designer drugs, nearly all such compounds that have come to prominence either have a bare cyclohexyl ring or a 2-ketocyclohexyl ring, while the piperidine is replaced by a variety of alkyl or cycloalkyl amines and most substitution has taken place on the phenyl ring. Consequently, it is common for widely used phenyl substituted analogues such as 3'-MeO-PCP and 3'-MeO-PCE to be referred to as 3-MeO-PCP and 3-MeO-PCE without the prime, even though this is technically incorrect and could lead to confusion.

== List of arylcyclohexylamines ==
Structures	Compound	Aryl Substituent	N Group	Cyclohexyl ring	CAS #
	PCA	Phenyl	NH_{2}	-	1934-71-0
	PCM	Phenyl	Methylamino	-	2201-16-3
	Eticyclidine	Phenyl	Ethylamino	-	2201-15-2
	PCPr	Phenyl	n-Propylamino	-	18949-81-0
	PCiP	Phenyl	Isopropylamino	-	1195-42-2
	PCAL	Phenyl	Allylamino	-	2185-95-7
	PCBu	Phenyl	n-Butylamino	-	73166-29-7
	PCEOH	Phenyl	Hydroxyethylamino	-	2201-22-1
	PCMEA	Phenyl	Methoxyethylamino	-	2201-57-2
	PCEEA	Phenyl	Ethoxyethylamino	-	1072895-05-6
	PCMPA	Phenyl	Methoxypropylamino	-	2201-58-3
	PCDM	Phenyl	Dimethylamino	-	2201-17-4
	Dieticyclidine	Phenyl	Diethylamino	-	2201-19-6
	2-HO-PCP	Phenyl	Piperidine	2-Hydroxy	94852-58-1
	2-Me-PCP	Phenyl	Piperidine	2-Methyl	59397-29-4
	2-MeO-PCP	Phenyl	Piperidine	2-Methoxy	78636-34-7
	2-Keto-PCP ("O-PCP")	Phenyl	Piperidine	2-Keto	101688-16-8
	Eticyclidone ("O-PCE")	Phenyl	Ethylamino	2-Keto	6740-82-5
	2-Keto-PCPr ("O-PCPr")	Phenyl	n-Propylamino	2-Keto	
	4-Methyl-PCP	Phenyl	Piperidine	4-Methyl	19420-52-1
	4-Keto-PCP	Phenyl	Piperidine	4-Keto	65620-13-5
	2'-Cl-PCP	o-Chlorophenyl	Piperidine	-	2201-31-2
	2'-Cl-O-PCP	o-Chlorophenyl	Piperidine	2-Keto	
	3'-Cl-PCP	m-Chlorophenyl	Piperidine	-	2201-32-3
	2'-MeO-PCP	o-Methoxyphenyl	Piperidine	-	2201-34-5
	3'-F-PCP	m-Fluorophenyl	Piperidine	-	89156-99-0
	3'-Me-PCP	m-Tolyl	Piperidine	-	2201-30-1
	3'-Me-PCPy	m-Tolyl	Pyrrolidine	-	1622348-63-3
	3'-NH_{2}-PCP	m-Aminophenyl	Piperidine	-	72242-00-3
	3'-HO-PCP	m-Hydroxyphenyl	Piperidine	-	79787-43-2
	3'-MeO-PCP	m-Methoxyphenyl	Piperidine	-	72242-03-6
	3-EtO-PCP	m-Ethoxyphenyl	Piperidine	-	
	3',4'-MD-PCP	3,4-Methylenedioxyphenyl	Piperidine	-	
	3'-Me-PCE	m-Tolyl	Ethylamino	-	2201-64-1
	3'-MeO-PCE	m-Methoxyphenyl	Ethylamino	-	1364933-80-1
	3'-HO-PCE	m-Hydroxyphenyl	Ethylamino	-	
	3-Cl-PCE	m-Chloro	Ethylamino	-	
	3'-MeO-PCPr	m-Methoxyphenyl	n-Propylamino	-	1364933-81-2
	3'-HO-PCPr	m-Hydroxyphenyl	n-Propylamino	-	
	3',4'-MD-PCPr	3,4-Methylenedioxyphenyl	n-Propylamino	-	
	3'-MeO-PCPy	m-Methoxyphenyl	Pyrrolidine	-	1364933-79-8
	3-F-PCiPr	m-Fluorophenyl	i-Propylamino	-	
	4'-HO-PCP	p-Hydroxyphenyl	Piperidine	-	66568-88-5
	Methoxydine (4'-MeO-PCP)	p-Methoxyphenyl	Piperidine	-	2201-35-6
	4'-MeO-PCE	p-Methoxyphenyl	Ethylamino	-	
	4'-F-PCP	p-Fluorophenyl	Piperidine	-	22904-99-0
	4'-F-PCPy	p-Fluorophenyl	Pyrrolidine	-	
	Arketamine	o-Chlorophenyl	Methylamino	2-Keto	33643-49-1
	Deschloroketamine	Phenyl	Methylamino	2-Keto	7063-30-1
	Esketamine	o-Chlorophenyl	Methylamino	2-Keto	33643-46-8
	Ketamine	o-Chlorophenyl	Methylamino	2-Keto	6740-88-1
	Hydroxynorketamine	o-Chlorophenyl	NH_{2}	2-Keto, 6-Hydroxy	81395-70-2
	Ethketamine	o-Chlorophenyl	Ethylamino	2-Keto	1354634-10-8
	NPNK	o-Chlorophenyl	n-Propylamino	2-Keto	2749326-65-4
	A-NK	o-Chlorophenyl	pent-4-ynylamino	2-Keto	
	Methoxyketamine	o-Methoxyphenyl	Methylamino	2-Keto	7063-51-6
	2-MeO-NEK	o-Methoxyphenyl	Ethylamino	2-Keto	
	oMDCK	o-Tolyl	Methylamino	2-Keto	7063-37-8
	mMDCK	m-Tolyl	Methylamino	2-Keto	
	meta-Ketamine	m-Chlorophenyl	Methylamino	2-Keto	7063-53-8
	iso-Ketamine	o-Chlorophenyl	Methylamino	4-Keto	
	2-Fluorodeschloroketamine	o-Fluorophenyl	Methylamino	2-Keto	111982-50-4
	3-Fluorodeschloroketamine	m-Fluorophenyl	Methylamino	2-Keto	2657761-23-2
	Blixeprodil	p-Fluorophenyl	Methylamino	2-Keto	2881017-49-6
	Bromoketamine	o-Bromophenyl	Methylamino	2-Keto	120807-70-7
	TFMDCK	o-Trifluoromethylphenyl	Methylamino	2-Keto	1782149-73-8
	TFMODCK	o-Trifluoromethoxyphenyl	Methylamino	2-Keto	
	SN 35210	o-Chlorophenyl	Carbomethoxybutylamino	2-Keto	1450615-41-4
	Methoxetamine	m-Methoxyphenyl	Ethylamino	2-Keto	1239943-76-0
	Methoxmetamine	m-Methoxyphenyl	Methylamino	2-Keto	1781829-56-8
	Methoxpropamine	m-Methoxyphenyl	n-Propylamino	2-Keto	2504100-71-2
	MXiPr	m-Methoxyphenyl	i-Propylamino	2-Keto	
	Ethoxetamine (EXE)	m-Ethoxyphenyl	Ethylamino	2-Keto	
	Deoxymethoxetamine (3-Me-2'-Oxo-PCE)	m-Tolyl	Ethylamino	2-Keto	2666932-45-0
	MTXE	m-Methylthio	Ethylamino	2-Keto	
	Br-MXE	2-bromo-5-methoxyphenyl	Ethylamino	2-Keto	
	Hydroxetamine (HXE)	m-Hydroxyphenyl	Ethylamino	2-Keto	1620054-73-0
	HXM	m-Hydroxyphenyl	Methylamino	2-Keto	
	2F-NENDCK	o-Fluorophenyl	Ethylamino	2-Keto	
	Fluorexetamine (FXE)	m-Fluorophenyl	Ethylamino	2-Keto	
	2-FXPr	o-Fluorophenyl	n-Propylamino	2-Keto	
	2-FXiPr	o-Fluorophenyl	i-Propylamino	2-Keto	
	MXPCP	m-Methoxyphenyl	Piperidine	2-Keto	
	Phencyclidine (PCP)	Phenyl	Piperidine	-	77-10-1
	PC3MP	Phenyl	3-Methylpiperidine	-	2201-41-4
	PC4MP	Phenyl	4-Methylpiperidine	-	2201-42-5
	PCTHP	Phenyl	1,2,3,6-Tetrahydropyridine	-	
	Rolicyclidine (PCPy)	Phenyl	Pyrrolidine	-	2201-39-0
	PCDMPy	Phenyl	3,3-Dimethylpyrrolidine	-	
	PCMo	Phenyl	Morpholine	-	2201-40-3
	Methoxy-PCM (2'-MeO-PCMo)	o-Methoxyphenyl	Morpholine	-	1314323-88-0
	3'-MeO-PCMo	m-Methoxyphenyl	Morpholine	-	138873-80-0
	4'-MeO-PCMo	p-Methoxyphenyl	Morpholine	-	
	Methyl-PCM (4'-Me-PCMo)	p-Tolyl	Morpholine	-	120803-52-3
	Hydroxy-methyl-PCM	2-Methyl-4-hydroxyphenyl	Morpholine	-	1314323-89-1
	PYCP	2-Pyridinyl	Piperidine	-	
	TCM	2-Thienyl	Methylamino	-	139401-07-3
	TCE	2-Thienyl	Ethylamino	-	101589-62-2
	TCPr	2-Thienyl	Propylamino	-	
	Tenocyclidine (TCP)	2-Thienyl	Piperidine	-	21500-98-1
	T3CP	3-Thienyl	Piperidine	-	19420-50-9
	TCPy	2-Thienyl	Pyrrolidine	-	22912-13-6
	TCTHP	2-Thienyl	1,2,3,6-Tetrahydropyridine	-	111318-13-9
	Tilmetamine	2-Thienyl	Methylamino	2-Keto	
	Tiletamine	2-Thienyl	Ethylamino	2-Keto	14176-49-9
	MXTE	4-Methoxy-2-thienyl	Ethylamino	2-Keto	
	Gacyclidine	2-Thienyl	Piperidine	2-Methyl	68134-81-6
	BDPC	p-Bromophenyl	Dimethylamino	4-Phenethyl-4-hydroxy	77239-98-6
	C-8813	p-Bromophenyl	Dimethylamino	4-(thiophen-2-yl)ethyl-4-hydroxy	616898-54-5
	Dimetamine	p-Tolyl	Dimethylamino	4-Keto	65619-06-9
	3''-OH-2'-Me-PCP	o-Tolyl	3-Hydroxypiperidine	-	
	4''-Ph-4''-OH-PCP	Phenyl	4-Phenyl-4-hydroxypiperidine	-	77179-39-6
	BTCP	Benzothiophen-2-yl	Piperidine	-	112726-66-6
	BTCPy	Benzothiophen-2-yl	Pyrrolidine	-	
	GK-189	Naphthalen-2-yl	Piperidine	-	81490-58-6

== Related compounds ==
Other similar compounds exist where the base ring has been varied, or the amine chain replaced with other groups. More cycloalkane ring sizes have been experimented with than just purely thinking in terms of the cyclohexylamine. The cyclopentyl homologue of PCP is active with around one-tenth the potency, while the cycloheptyl and cyclooctyl derivatives are inactive, though some substituted arylcycloheptylamines retain activity. The requisite cycloalkylketone is reacted with PhMgBr; 3° alcohol is then reacted with NaN_{3}; azide then reduced with LAH. Then in the final step the piperidine ring is constructed with 1-5-dibromo-pentane. Other compounds are known where the cyclohexyl base ring is replaced by rings such as norbornyl, adamantyl, tetralin, oxane, thiane or piperidine. Conformationally constrained analogs have been prepared and researched by Morieti et al.

Structure	Compound	Aryl Substituent	N Group	Base ring	CAS #
	Ketamir	2-Chlorophenyl	Methylamine	2-Oxocyclopentyl	
	PCPEP	Phenyl	Piperidine	Cyclopentyl	23036-19-3
	3F-PCHEPy	3-Fluorophenyl	Pyrrolidine	Cycloheptyl	
	3-MeO-PBCHP	3-Methoxyphenyl	Piperidine	Bicyclo[2.2.1]heptane	
	PADP (P2AP)	Phenyl	Piperidine	Adamantyl	72241-99-7
	3-MeO-PTP	3-Methoxyphenyl	Piperidine	Tetralin	
	HHFA	Fused phenyl	Amino	Hexahydrofluorene	
	DHPQ	Phenyl	Decahydroquinoline		
	POXP	Phenyl	Piperidine	Oxane	
	PTHP	Phenyl	Piperidine	Thiane	
	MPBPip	Phenyl	Piperidine	N-Methylpiperidine	36882-04-9
	BnCP	Benzyl	Piperidine	Cyclohexyl	22912-07-8
	YNCP	Ethynyl	Piperidine	Cyclohexyl	51165-02-7
	ALCP	Allyl	Piperidine	Cyclohexyl	7418-80-6
	F-17475	Phenyl	Diethylamide	3-Aminocyclobutyl	1612885-86-5
	Piritramide	Replaced by carboxamide	Piperidine	N-(3-cyano-3,3-diphenylpropyl)piperidine	302-41-0
	PRE-084	Phenyl	Morpholinylethylcarboxylate	Cyclohexyl	138847-85-5
	Clofenciclan	p-Chlorophenyl	Diethylaminoethoxy	Cyclohexyl	5632-52-0
