= Deoxymethoxetamine =

Chemical compound

Legal status
- Legal status: DE: NpSG (Industrial and scientific use only); UK: Class B

Identifiers
- IUPAC name: 2-(ethylamino)-2-(3-methylphenyl)cyclohexan-1-one
- CAS Number: 2666932-45-0
- PubChem CID: 157010705
- ChemSpider: 129433772
- UNII: G32GTT7MGW
- CompTox Dashboard (EPA): DTXSID701336932

Chemical and physical data
- Formula: C_{15}H_{21}NO
- Molar mass: 231.339 g·mol^{−1}
- 3D model (JSmol): Interactive image
- SMILES: CCNC1(CCCCC1=O)c1cccc(C)c1
- InChI: InChI=1S/C15H21NO/c1-3-16-15(10-5-4-9-14(15)17)13-8-6-7-12(2)11-13/h6-8,11,16H,3-5,9-10H2,1-2H3; Key:WIMLPRYZJQNQLE-UHFFFAOYSA-N

Deoxymethoxetamine (3'-methyl-2-oxo-PCE, DMXE, 3D-MXE, Warm-K) is a recreational designer drug from the arylcyclohexylamine family, with dissociative effects. It is an analogue of methoxetamine where the 3-methoxy group has been replaced by methyl. It has been sold online since around October 2020, and was first definitively identified by a forensic laboratory in Denmark in February 2021.

== See also ==
- 3-Methyl-PCE
- 3-Methyl-PCP
- 3-Methyl-PCPy
- Hydroxetamine
- Fluorexetamine
- Methoxetamine
- Methoxieticyclidine
- MXiPr
