= 4-MeO-PCP =

Chemical compound

Clinical data
- ATC code: none

Legal status
- Legal status: CA: Schedule I; DE: NpSG (Industrial and scientific use only); UK: Class B

Identifiers
- IUPAC name: 1-[1-(4-methoxyphenyl)cyclohexyl]-piperidine
- CAS Number: 2201-35-6 91164-58-8 (hydrochloride)
- PubChem CID: 15100753
- ChemSpider: 10526416
- UNII: OZM0C31BLL
- CompTox Dashboard (EPA): DTXSID40176450

Chemical and physical data
- Formula: C_{18}H_{27}NO
- Molar mass: 273.420 g·mol^{−1}
- 3D model (JSmol): Interactive image
- SMILES: COc1ccc(cc1)C2(CCCCC2)N3CCCCC3
- InChI: InChI=1S/C18H27NO/c1-20-17-10-8-16(9-11-17)18(12-4-2-5-13-18)19-14-6-3-7-15-19/h8-11H,2-7,12-15H2,1H3; Key:MUZGGFNYVLGUFS-UHFFFAOYSA-N

4-Methoxyphencyclidine (methoxydine, 4-MeO-PCP) is a dissociative anesthetic drug that has been sold online as a research chemical. It acts as an NMDA receptor antagonist, with secondary activity at norepinephrine and serotonin transporters, as well as the σ_{1} and σ_{2} receptors.

== Pharmacology ==
4-MeO-PCP has a lower affinity for the NMDA receptor than PCP, but a higher affinity than ketamine. It is orally active in a dosage range similar to ketamine. 4-MeO-PCP has K_{i} values of 404 nM for the NMDA receptor, 713 nM for the norepinephrine transporter, 844 nM for the serotonin transporter, 296 nM for the σ_{1} receptor and 143 nM for the σ_{2} receptor.

== Chemistry ==
4-MeO-PCP hydrochloride is a white crystalline solid with a melting point of 181-182 °C

== History ==
The synthesis of 4-MeO-PCP was first reported in 1965 by the Parke-Davis medicinal chemist Victor Maddox. A 1999 review published by a chemist using the pseudonym John Q. Beagle suggested the potency of 4-MeO-PCP in man was reduced relative to PCP, two years later Beagle published a detailed description of the synthesis and qualitative effects of 4-MeO-PCP, which he said possessed 70% the potency of PCP.

== Society and culture ==
4-MeO-PCP was the first arylcyclohexylamine research chemical to be sold online, it was introduced in late 2008 by a company trading under the name CBAY and was followed by several related compounds such as 3-MeO-PCP and methoxetamine.

Users have reported substantial differences in active dose, these discrepancies can be partially explained by the presence of unreacted PCC and other impurities in samples sold on the grey market.

=== Legal Status ===
On October 18, 2012, the Advisory Council on the Misuse of Drugs in the United Kingdom released a report about methoxetamine, saying that the "harms of methoxetamine are commensurate with Class B of the Misuse of Drugs Act (1971)", despite the fact that the act does not classify drugs based on harm. The report went on to suggest that all analogues of MXE should also become class B drugs and suggested a catch-all clause covering both existing and unresearched arylcyclohexamines, including 4-MeO-PCP.

4-MeO-PCP is illegal in Sweden

As per Chile's Ley de drogas, aka Ley 20000, all esters and ethers of PCP are illegal. As 4-MeO-PCP is an ether of PCP, it is thus illegal.

== See also ==
- Arylcyclohexylamine
- 3-HO-PCP
- 3-HO-PCE
- 3-MeO-PCE
- 3-MeO-PCMo
- 3-MeO-PCP
- MDPCP
- Methoxetamine
- Methoxyketamine
