= 3-Chloro-PCP =

Chemical compound

Legal status
- Legal status: CA: Schedule I; DE: NpSG (Industrial and scientific use only); UK: Class B

Identifiers
- IUPAC name: 1-[1-(3-chlorophenyl)cyclohexyl]piperidine
- CAS Number: 2201-32-3
- PubChem CID: 125502037
- ChemSpider: 129433355
- UNII: BG2WV34L9L
- CompTox Dashboard (EPA): DTXSID301336904

Chemical and physical data
- Formula: C_{17}H_{24}ClN
- Molar mass: 277.84 g·mol^{−1}
- 3D model (JSmol): Interactive image
- SMILES: C1CCC(CC1)(C2=CC(=CC=C2)Cl)N3CCCCC3
- InChI: InChI=1S/C17H24ClN/c18-16-9-7-8-15(14-16)17(10-3-1-4-11-17)19-12-5-2-6-13-19/h7-9,14H,1-6,10-13H2; Key:HUHBTESMMFLCAN-UHFFFAOYSA-N

3-Chloro-PCP (3'-Cl-PCP) is a recreational designer drug from the arylcyclohexylamine family, with dissociative effects. It has been shown to act as an NMDA antagonist, with secondary effects as a dopamine reuptake inhibitor. It was first identified in Slovenia in December 2020.

== Legal status ==
=== Hungary ===
3-Cl-PCP was made illegal in Hungary in April 2021.

=== Japan ===
3-Cl-PCP was regulated as Shitei Yakubutsu in Japan from May 2026. Its manufacture, importation, sale, possession, and use were prohibited in principle.

== See also ==
- 3-F-PCP
- 3-Me-PCP
- 3-MeO-PCP
- 4-Keto-PCP
