= Fluorexetamine =

Chemical compound

Legal status
- Legal status: CA: Schedule I; DE: NpSG (Industrial and scientific use only); UK: Class B; US: Unscheduled

Identifiers
- IUPAC name: 2-(ethylamino)-2-(3-fluorophenyl)cyclohexan-1-one
- PubChem CID: 137332183
- ChemSpider: 129433380
- UNII: AN89GB52AM
- CompTox Dashboard (EPA): DTXSID701336920

Chemical and physical data
- Formula: C_{14}H_{18}FNO
- Molar mass: 235.302 g·mol^{−1}
- 3D model (JSmol): Interactive image
- SMILES: CCNC1(CCCCC1=O)c1cccc(F)c1
- InChI: InChI=1S/C14H18FNO/c1-2-16-14(9-4-3-8-13(14)17)11-6-5-7-12(15)10-11/h5-7,10,16H,2-4,8-9H2,1H3; Key:FCETYWCLCUZFJI-UHFFFAOYSA-N

Fluorexetamine (3'-fluoro-2-oxo-PCE, 3-FXE) is a recreational designer drug from the arylcyclohexylamine family, with dissociative effects. It has reportedly been sold over the internet since around 2017, though has remained relatively uncommon.

In April 2023 it was revealed by DrugsData.org that all their previously analyzed samples of fluorexetamine actually contained 2'-fluoro-2-oxo-PCE (2-FXE, also known as CanKet) rather than 3'-fluoro-2-oxo PCE (3-FXE). This was confirmed by a newly available reference standard for 2-FXE. Similar misidentification may have occurred in other laboratories.

== See also ==
- 2-Fluorodeschloroketamine
- 2F-NENDCK
- 3-Fluorodeschloroketamine
- 3-Fluoro-PCP
- Blixeprodil
- Deoxymethoxetamine
- Hydroxetamine
- Methoxetamine
- MXiPr
