= 2F-NENDCK =

Chemical compound

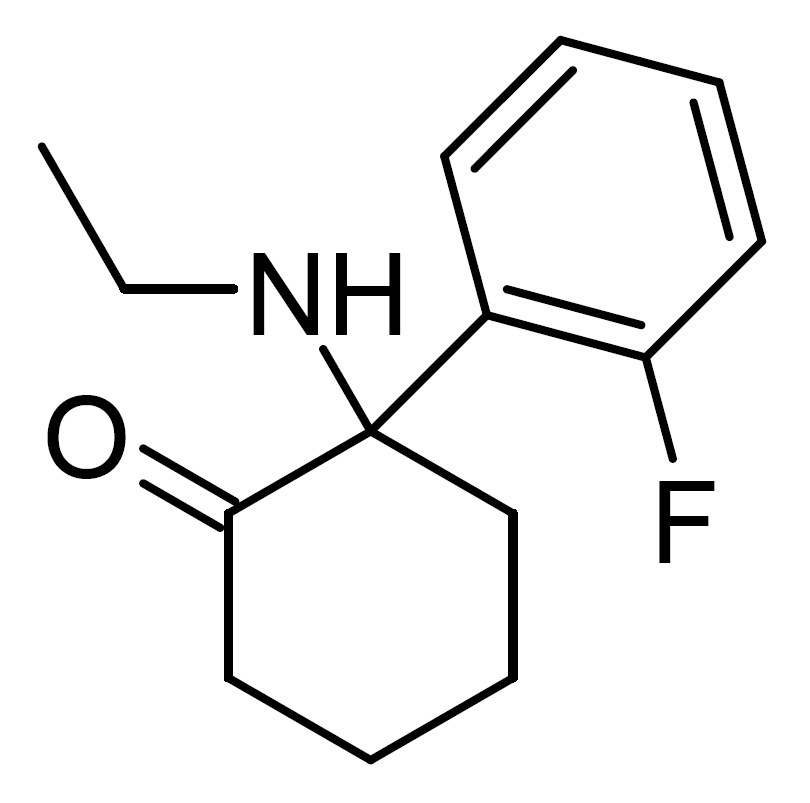

Identifiers
- IUPAC name: 2-(ethylamino)-2-(2-fluorophenyl)cyclohexan-1-one
- CAS Number: 2850352-64-4
- PubChem CID: 168323042

Chemical and physical data
- Formula: C_{14}H_{18}FNO
- Molar mass: 235.302 g·mol^{−1}
- 3D model (JSmol): Interactive image
- SMILES: CCNC1(CCCCC1=O)C2=CC=CC=C2F
- InChI: InChI=1S/C14H18FNO/c1-2-16-14(10-6-5-9-13(14)17)11-7-3-4-8-12(11)15/h3-4,7-8,16H,2,5-6,9-10H2,1H3; Key:RTXKYSLDFKUESF-UHFFFAOYSA-N

2F-NENDCK (also known as CanKet, 2-fluoro-N-ethylnordeschloroketamine, 2'-fluoro-2-oxo-phenylcyclohexylethylamine, 2'-Fluoro-2-Oxo-PCE, and 2-FXE) is a recreational designer drug from the arylcyclohexylamine family, with dissociative effects presumably similar to those of ketamine. Its general effects, dissociative or otherwise, may deviate from other arylcyclohexylamines.

It was initially identified in Canberra, Australia in mid-August 2022 by the government-funded drug-testing service CanTEST. It has since been dubbed "CanKet" due to it originally being found in Canberra and being a structural analogue of ketamine. It has subsequently been discovered in Taiwan, China and New Zealand.

In April 2023, it was revealed by DrugsData.org that all of their previous samples of Fluorexetamine (3-FXE) actually contained 2F-NENDCK (2-FXE).

== Uses and effects ==
=== Uses ===
Due to the lack of research pertaining to it, there are no known legitimate uses for CanKet. Its long-term effects on the human body are unknown, and therefore, it is advised for individuals to use caution when deciding whether or not to consume CanKet, as is the case for most other designer drugs.

=== Effects ===
While not much is known about the drug's effects, anecdotal reports offer some insight into them. According to a VICE News interview with one anonymous recreational user,

"it’s worse [than ketamine] but only slightly... The ‘happy’ feeling was lacking a little bit. I find I snort K [ketamine] and a smile forms on my face when it starts kicking in. This was lacking that—I’d just come up and kinda stay in a mundane headspace while feeling wonky."

On online forums, users report conflicting information about its effects, with some users reporting a stimulating effect. Most agree that the duration of its effects is four to six hours, much longer than ketamine's duration, which typically is approximately one hour when insufflated.

While such anecdotal reports may shed some light on CanKet's effects, these are highly subjective, and individual differences may lead to different users experiencing different effects. Professor Malcom MacLeod, an associate professor at the Australian National University's research school of chemistry, while speaking on the topic of CanKet, stated, "We don't know much about its effects," observing that users' accounts of the effects vary and are "often quite subjective and [it can be] a bit hard to unravel exactly what’s going on."

== Chemistry ==
=== Structure ===
Chemically, CanKet is a fluorinated arylcyclohexylamine and a ketamine derivative. It is quite similar to ketamine structurally but differs in a few ways:

- Halogen substitution: in CanKet, chlorine atom on the aryl group is substituted for fluorine atom.
- N-ethyl group: the N-methyl group normally found in ketamine is replaced with an N-ethyl group in 2-fluoro-N-ethyl-deschloro-Ketmine increasing lipophilicity of this molecule. This increases tissue retention time and is the most likely explanation for elongated duration time of its effects.

== See also ==
- 2-Fluorodeschloroketamine
- 3-Fluorodeschloroketamine
- Fluorexetamine
- Methoxetamine
- N-Ethylnorketamine
