= Gacyclidine =

Chemical compound

Clinical data
- ATC code: none

Legal status
- Legal status: Investigational

Identifiers
- IUPAC name: 1-[(1R,2S)-2-methyl-1-thiophen-2-ylcyclohexyl]piperidine
- CAS Number: 68134-81-6
- PubChem CID: 176265
- ChemSpider: 153540
- UNII: 9290ND070R
- ChEMBL: ChEMBL1742478
- CompTox Dashboard (EPA): DTXSID30218313

Chemical and physical data
- Formula: C_{16}H_{25}NS
- Molar mass: 263.44 g·mol^{−1}
- 3D model (JSmol): Interactive image
- SMILES: C[C@@H](CCCC1)[C@@]1(N2CCCCC2)C3=CC=CS3
- InChI: InChI=1S/C16H25NS/c1-14-8-3-4-10-16(14,15-9-7-13-18-15)17-11-5-2-6-12-17/h7,9,13-14H,2-6,8,10-12H2,1H3/t14-,16+/m0/s1; Key:DKFAAPPUYWQKKF-GOEBONIOSA-N

Gacyclidine (GK-11, OTO-313) is a psychoactive drug which acts as a dissociative via functioning as a non-competitive NMDA receptor antagonist. It is closely related to phencyclidine (PCP), and specifically, is a derivative of tenocyclidine (TCP). Gacyclidine exhibits neuroprotective effects similar to those of other NMDA receptor antagonists, with the advantage of being substantially less neurotoxic maybe due to its interaction with "non-NMDA" binding sites.

== History ==
Gacyclidine is a psychoactive drug that was tested for helping with nerve damage caused by organophosphorus nerve agents in humans, with little to no reported abuse statistics. While gacyclidine has been used in numerous tests dating back to 2012, these tests did not provide fruitful results that would push the future of the drug into a different direction.

== Chemistry ==
The 1,2-addition of 2-methylcyclohexanone (I) with 2-thienyl lithium (II) or 2-thienyl magnesium bromide (III) gives cyclohexanol (IV) as a diastereomeric mixture, which was treated with sodium azide (NaN_{3}) in trichloroacetic acid to yield the azide (V). The reduction of (V) with lithium aluminium hydride (LiAlH_{4}) or Raney nickel in isopropanol affords the corresponding amine (VI), preferentially with the cis-configuration. Finally, this compound is dialkylated with 1,5-dibromopentane (VII) by means of potassium carbonate (K_{2}CO_{3}) in acetonitrile to provide the target compound as a diastereomeric mixture.

Gacyclidine synthesis

== Uses ==
Gacyclidine's original purpose was for helping with human body trauma, specifically spine and brain trauma. Tests were done on animals to see how their bodies would react to the different drugs and see how that information could be applied to humans. Gacyclidine is used to reduce damage to the brain or spinal cord, hence a treatment for tinnitus, stroke, trauma, and convulsion. As a psychoactive drug, alteration of perception is what makes this substance of use.

A lipid-based intratympanic formulation of gacyclidine (OTO-313) has been studied as a potential therapy for the treatment of tinnitus. A randomized, placebo-controlled Phase II trial found that OTO-313 was safe and well-tolerated but did not demonstrate a significant treatment benefit in unilateral tinnitus relative to placebo (believed to be partly due to a high placebo response). In 2022, the company developing OTO‑313 announced it would stop developing the drug for tinnitus.

=== Dosage ===
Testing of gacyclidine was performed on animals in a study. In concluding hours (18-96 h), no necrotic neurons were discovered in animals with dosages of 1, 5, 10, 20 milligrams of gacyclidine. At 20 milligrams the presence of a few cytoplasmic vacuoles were present. In a study conducted to find possible neurotoxicity in dosages, scientists tested the effects of gacyclidine in comparison to dizocilpine and CNS-1102, and finalized more positive effects on animals from gacyclidine. When given MK-801 at dosages of 1 or 5 milligrams of gacyclidine, effects were harmless and behaved similarly to untreated animals. At dosages between 5 and 10 milligrams, the animals began to experience behaviors of tremors, sedation and exophthalmos. With CNS-1102, at all doses tested, the animals exhibited some excitation. At the highest doses (10 and 20 milligrams) they suffered from severe akinesia 1 hour after drug administration. Animals that received 1 or 5 milligrams of gacyclidine or its enantiomers behave similarly to untreated animals. At the highest doses (10 and 20 milligrams), the animals began to show some signs of excitation. For all doses, the recovery period was always better with gacyclidine and its enantiomers than with MK-801 or CNS-1102. The days after the testing, labs observed electron microscopy in the 20-milligram group. During observation small lesions were labeled as cytoplasmic or intramitochondrial vacuoles. In addition, no neuronal or glial alterations, such as astrocytic swelling or microglial activation, were seen that could suggest a short-term toxic event had occurred. Further concluding observations, current evidence indicates that the possibility of a short-term toxicity, would be totally reversible. Likewise, any long-term toxicity would become evident after 4 days. But, the evidence in total strongly suggests that gacyclidine and its enantiomers are, at least, far less neurotoxic than MK-801.

=== Effects ===
With the use of this drug, motor skills have significantly improved upon use, as it is the antagonist to the NMDA receptor. Gacyclidine is able to reduce calcium getting into cells. While animal test results showed potential in the rats, human tests showed slight improvement to the condition of patients. Outside of results seen in animals like potential trauma assistance and pain relief, there is little to no proof that there will be any clinical benefits in the future of gacyclidine.

== See also ==
- Arylcyclohexylamine
- Memantine
- Dextrallorphan
- Dimemorfan
