= C15H23N =

The molecular formula C_{15}H_{23}N (molar mass: 217.35 g/mol, exact mass: 217.1830 u) may refer to:

- PCPr
- Prolintane
- 3-Me-PCE
