= MDPCP =

Chemical compound

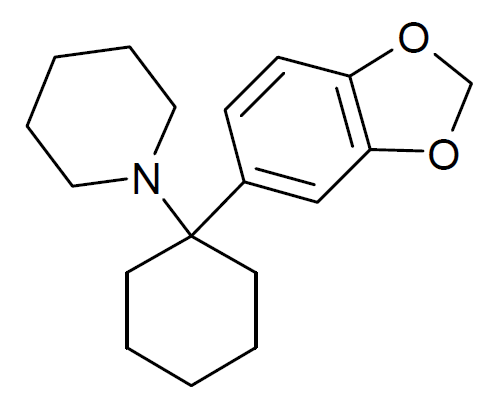

Identifiers
- CAS Number: 3034185-93-5
- PubChem CID: 165360308
- ChemSpider: 129539440

Chemical and physical data
- Formula: C_{18}H_{25}NO_{2}
- Molar mass: 287.403 g·mol^{−1}
- 3D model (JSmol): Interactive image
- SMILES: C1CCC(CC1)(N1CCCCC1)c1ccc2c(c1)OCO2
- InChI: InChI=1S/C18H25NO2/c1-3-9-18(10-4-1,19-11-5-2-6-12-19)15-7-8-16-17(13-15)21-14-20-16/h7-8,13H,1-6,9-12,14H2; Key:ANUGFLCSICVCSB-UHFFFAOYSA-N

Methylenedioxyphencyclidine (3,4-MD-PCP, MDPCP) is a recreational designer drug with dissociative effects. It is an arylcyclohexylamine derivative, with similar effects to related drugs such as 3-MeO-PCP and 4-MeO-PCP.

== Chemical properties ==
MDPCP has the molecular formula C_{18}H_{25}NO_{2} and a molar mass of 287.403 g·mol−1. Its structural characteristics include a methylenedioxy functional group attached to the phenyl ring, a hallmark of several psychoactive substances within this category.

== Pharmacology and effects ==
As a dissociative drug, MDPCP exerts its effects primarily through antagonism of the NMDA receptor, resulting in altered sensory perceptions and dissociative states. The drug's subjective effects are reported to be similar to those of related arylcyclohexylamine derivatives. It has been reported to have an affinity of 63 nM for NMDARs determined in rat forebrains and was reasonably selective over other receptors tested including monoamine transporters and opioid receptors.

== Legal status ==
Given its status as a novel psychoactive substance, MDPCP may be subject to varying degrees of legal control across different jurisdictions, often falling under generic legislation targeting arylcyclohexylamine derivatives or dissociative substances.

== See also ==
- 3-F-PCP
- 3-Methyl-PCPy
- MXiPr
- MDMAR
- MDPM
- MDPV
- M-ALPHA
