= 3-HO-PCP =

Chemical compound

Clinical data
- Other names: 3-Hydroxyphencyclidine; 3-OH-PCP; PCP-3-OH

Legal status
- Legal status: CA: Schedule I; DE: NpSG (Industrial and scientific use only); UK: Class B; Illegal in Sweden and Switzerland

Identifiers
- IUPAC name: 3-[1-(Piperidin-1-yl)cyclohexyl]phenol
- CAS Number: 79787-43-2 79295-51-5 (hydrochloride)
- PubChem CID: 133277
- ChemSpider: 117583
- UNII: V886QLHNA6
- CompTox Dashboard (EPA): DTXSID20229918

Chemical and physical data
- Formula: C_{17}H_{25}NO
- Molar mass: 259.393 g·mol^{−1}
- 3D model (JSmol): Interactive image
- SMILES: c1cc(cc(c1)O)C2(CCCCC2)N3CCCCC3
- InChI: InChI=1S/C17H25NO/c19-16-9-7-8-15(14-16)17(10-3-1-4-11-17)18-12-5-2-6-13-18/h7-9,14,19H,1-6,10-13H2; Key:AMSXTZUCNOKUEN-UHFFFAOYSA-N

3-Hydroxyphencyclidine (3-HO-PCP) is a dissociative of the arylcyclohexylamine class derived from PCP. It has been sold online as a designer drug.

3-HO-PCP primarily acts as an NMDA antagonist. However, it also has strong activity at opioid receptors compared to related drugs, and has significant activity at the σ_{1} receptor.

== Pharmacology ==
=== Pharmacodynamics ===
3-HO-PCP acts as a high-affinity uncompetitive NMDA receptor antagonist via the PCP site with a K_{i} of 30 nM. It has a higher affinity than PCP, which has a K_{i} of 250 nM for this site (eight-fold higher).

Unlike many other arylcyclohexylamines, including close analogues such as 3-Chloro-PCP and 3-MeO-PCP, 3-HO-PCP has a high affinity for various opioid receptors. It has a K_{i} value of 39–60 nM for the μ-opioid receptor, 140 nM for the κ-opioid receptor, and 42 nM for the σ_{1} receptor. It has weaker activity at the δ-opioid receptor, with a K_{i} of 2,300 nM.

=== Pharmacokinetics ===
Four primary metabolic pathways of 3-HO-PCP have been identified. These include piperidine hydroxylation, N-dealkylation, O-glucuronidation, and O-sulfate-conjugation. In urine samples, the N-dealkylated-COOH metabolite was the main metabolite detected.

Although it was hypothesized that 3-HO-PCP might be a metabolite of PCP in humans, there is no evidence that this is the case. 3-HO-PCP is a metabolite of 3-MeO-PCP.

== Chemistry ==
3-HO-PCP is an arylcyclohexylamine which is derived from PCP and closely structurally related to 3-MeO-PCP, 3-MeO-PCMo, and 4-MeO-PCP, among others

== History ==
3-HO-PCP was mentioned by a chemist under the pseudonym "John Q. Beagle" in 1999 in a post on The Hive. The psychoactive effects of 3-HO-PCP have been described by Bluelight users even before its availability as a research chemical in 2009.

== Society and culture ==
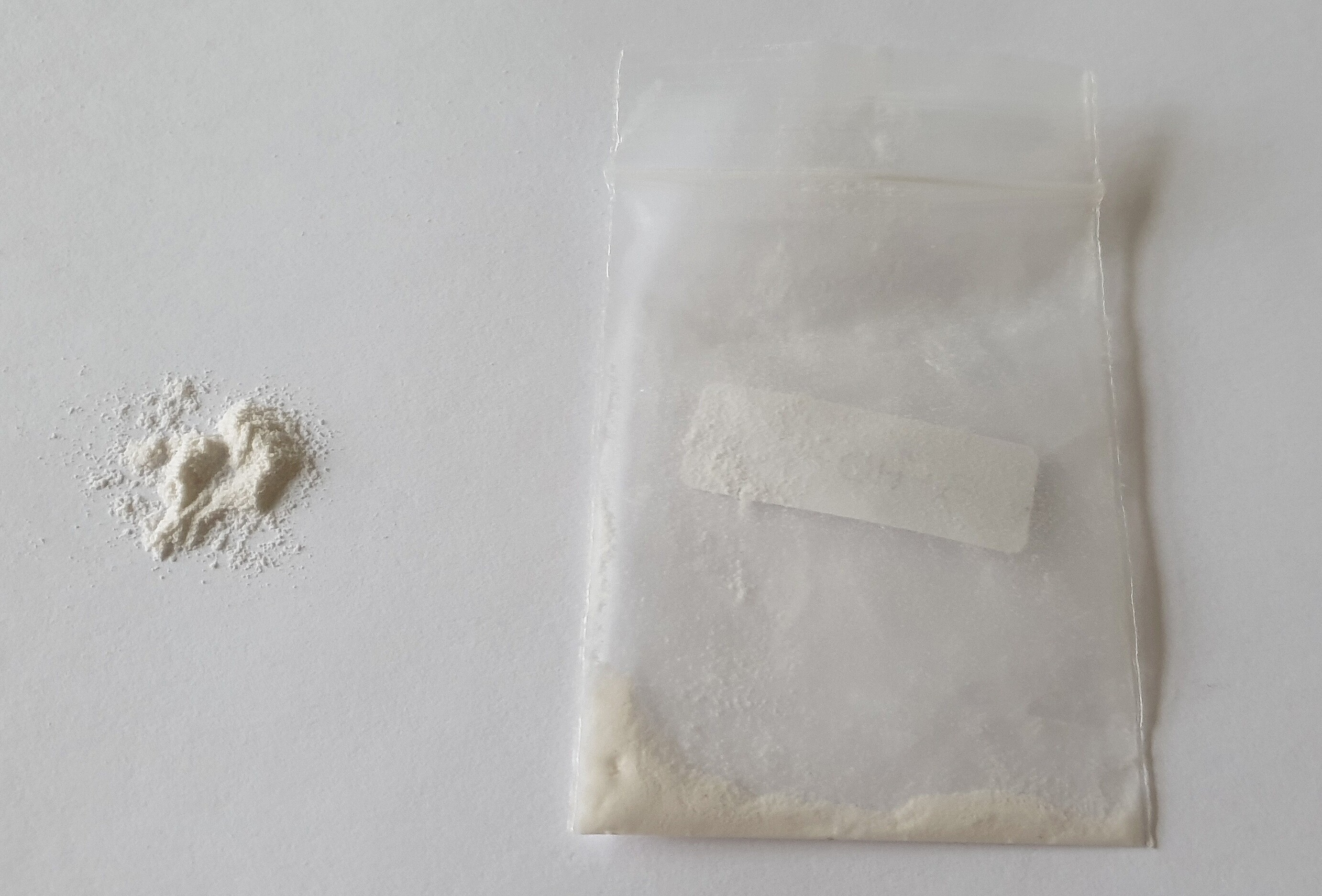
3-Hydroxyphencyclidine

=== Legal status ===
==== United Kingdom ====
On October 18, 2012, the Advisory Council on the Misuse of Drugs in the United Kingdom released a report about methoxetamine, saying that the "harms of methoxetamine are commensurate with Class B of the Misuse of Drugs Act (1971)", despite the fact that the act does not classify drugs based on harm. The report went on to suggest that all analogues of MXE should also become class B drugs and suggested a catch-all clause covering both existing and unresearched arylcyclohexamines, including 3-HO-PCP.

==== Sweden ====
3-HO-PCP is illegal in Sweden.

==== Switzerland ====
3-HO-PCP is illegal in Switzerland.

== See also ==
- 2-FDCK
- 4-Keto-PCP
- Delucemine
- Desmetramadol
- Hydroxetamine
- Dimetamine
- 3-HO-PCE
