= 3-MeO-PCE =

Chemical compound

Clinical data
- Other names: 3-MeO-PCE; Methoxieticyclidine

Legal status
- Legal status: DE: NpSG (Industrial and scientific use only); UK: Class B; Illegal in Sweden and Switzerland

Identifiers
- IUPAC name: N-Ethyl-1-(3-methoxyphenyl)cyclohexan-1-amine
- CAS Number: 1364933-80-1
- PubChem CID: 57461569
- ChemSpider: 58191438
- UNII: PX6CYK9I4H
- CompTox Dashboard (EPA): DTXSID701032419

Chemical and physical data
- Formula: C_{15}H_{23}NO
- Molar mass: 233.355 g·mol^{−1}
- 3D model (JSmol): Interactive image
- SMILES: CCNC1(CCCCC1)C2=CC(=CC=C2)OC
- InChI: InChI=1S/C15H23NO/c1-3-16-15(10-5-4-6-11-15)13-8-7-9-14(12-13)17-2/h7-9,12,16H,3-6,10-11H2,1-2H3; Key:OFGOOZLOGUNDFS-UHFFFAOYSA-N

3-Methoxyeticyclidine (3-MeO-PCE), also known as methoxieticyclidine, is a dissociative anesthetic that is qualitatively similar to PCE and PCP. It has been sold online as a designer drug.

3-MeO-PCE has been shown to have significant affinity as an NMDA antagonist, with other activity at dopamine and serotonin transporters, σ_{1} and σ_{2} receptors, H2 receptors, and α_{2}-adrenergic receptors

== Pharmacology ==
=== Pharmacodynamics ===
A report described the receptor binding profile of methoxetamine and three additional dissociatives 3-MeO-PCP, 4-MeO-PCP, and 3-MeO-PCE. They were shown to have significant affinity for the PCP site of the NMDA receptor.

3-MeO-PCE has K_{i} values of 61 nM for the NMDAR, 743 nM for the dopamine transporter, 2097 nM for the histamine H2 receptor, 964 nM for the alpha-2A adrenergic receptor, 115 nM for the serotonin transporter, 4519 nM for the σ_{1} receptor, and 525 nM for the σ_{2} receptor.

== Society and culture ==
=== Legal status ===
On October 18, 2012, the Advisory Council on the Misuse of Drugs in the United Kingdom released a report about methoxetamine, saying that the "harms of methoxetamine are commensurate with Class B of the Misuse of Drugs Act (1971)", despite the fact that the act does not classify drugs based on harm. The report went on to suggest that all analogues of methoxetamine should also become class B drugs and suggested a catch-all clause covering both existing and unresearched arylcyclohexylamines, including 3-MeO-PCE.

3-MeO-PCE is banned in Sweden and Switzerland.

As per Chile's Ley de drogas, aka Ley 20000, all esters and ethers of PCE are illegal. As 3-MeO-PCE is an ether of PCE, it is thus illegal.

== See also ==
- 3-HO-PCE
- 3-HO-PCP
- 3-MeO-PCMo
- Arylcyclohexylamine
- Ketamine
- Methoxyketamine
- Eticyclidine
