= C14H18FNO =

The molecular formula C_{14}H_{18}FNO (molar mass: 235.302 g/mol, exact mass: 235.137242 u) may refer to:

- Fluorexetamine
- 2F-NENDCK
