= 3-Fluoro-PCP =

Chemical compound

Legal status
- Legal status: CA: Schedule I; DE: NpSG (Industrial and scientific use only); UK: Class B

Identifiers
- IUPAC name: 1-[1-(3-fluorophenyl)cyclohexyl]piperidine
- CAS Number: 89156-99-0 1049718-37-7 (hydrochloride)
- PubChem CID: 398433
- ChemSpider: 353205
- UNII: YXB2T59KED
- CompTox Dashboard (EPA): DTXSID90327970

Chemical and physical data
- Formula: C_{17}H_{24}FN
- Molar mass: 261.384 g·mol^{−1}
- 3D model (JSmol): Interactive image
- SMILES: Fc1cccc(c1)C1(CCCCC1)N1CCCCC1
- InChI: InChI=1S/C17H24FN/c18-16-9-7-8-15(14-16)17(10-3-1-4-11-17)19-12-5-2-6-13-19/h7-9,14H,1-6,10-13H2; Key:PFPLGKFWWBXTNP-UHFFFAOYSA-N

3-Fluoro-PCP (3'-F-PCP, 3F-PCP) is a recreational designer drug from the arylcyclohexylamine family, with dissociative effects. It was first identified in Slovenia in October 2020, and was made illegal in Hungary in April 2021.

== See also ==
- 3-Fluorodeschloroketamine
- 3-Chloro-PCP
- 3-Methyl-PCP
- 3-MeO-PCP
- 4-Keto-PCP
- Fluorexetamine
