= BTCP (disambiguation) =

BTCP is benzothiophenylcyclohexylpiperidine, a psychoactive recreational drug.

BTCP may also refer to:

- British Transport Commission Police, former name of the British Transport Police
- Bachelor of Town and County Planning, a British degree abbreviation
- Breakthrough cancer pain, see Pain § Breakthrough

== See also ==
- Baku–Tbilisi–Ceyhan pipeline (BTC pipeline)
