= Dimetamine =

Dimetamine may refer to:

- A brand name of propylhexedrine
- A slang name for the synthetic opioid 4-dimethylamino-4-(p-tolyl)cyclohexanone
- Dimetamine (alkaloid), an alkaloid isolated from Thermopsis alterniflora
