= C15H19N =

The molecular formula C_{15}H_{19}N may refer to:

- Ethylnaphthylaminopropane
- NEFA (drug)
