= C17H25N =

The molecular formula C_{17}H_{25}N (molar mass: 243.39 g/mol, exact mass: 243.1987 u) may refer to:

- 3-Methyl-PCPy (3-Me-PCPy)
- Phencyclidine, or phenylcyclohexyl piperidine (PCP)
