= C14H19NO =

The molecular formula C_{14}H_{19}NO may refer to:

- Alpha-Pyrrolidinobutiophenone
- Ethoxyquin, a food preservative
- Eticyclidone
- 2'-Oxo-PCE
- 4'-Methyl-α-pyrrolidinopropiophenone
- MiPBF
