= C14H19NO4 =

The molecular formula C_{14}H_{19}NO_{4} (molar mass: 265.31 g/mol, exact mass: 265.1314 u) may refer to:

- Anisomycin, also known as flagecidin
- Filenadol
