= C19H27NO3 =

The molecular formula C_{19}H_{27}NO_{3} (molar mass: 317.42 g/mol, exact mass: 317.1991 u) may refer to:

- EA-3443
- Nateglinide
- PRE-084
- Tetrabenazine
