= Isoethcathinone =

Designer drug

Clinical data
- ATC code: none

Identifiers
- IUPAC name: (±)-1-ethylamino-1-phenyl-propan-2-one
- CAS Number: 65913-24-8; hydrochloride: 65913-25-9
- ChemSpider: 58827885
- UNII: 46GPN0YCU6; hydrochloride: 9305007E57
- CompTox Dashboard (EPA): DTXSID901029846

Chemical and physical data
- Formula: C_{11}H_{15}NO
- Molar mass: 177.247 g·mol^{−1}
- 3D model (JSmol): Interactive image
- SMILES: CCNC(C(C)=O)c1ccccc1
- InChI: InChI=1S/C11H15NO/c1-3-12-11(9(2)13)10-7-5-4-6-8-10/h4-8,11-12H,3H2,1-2H3; Key:GHVCNLDRNVGRJP-UHFFFAOYSA-N

Isoethcathinone is a designer drug with purportedly stimulant effects, first encountered in Ireland in 2010 and reported to the EMCDDA new drug monitoring service. It is unclear whether it has desirable pharmacological properties in its own right, or is merely an impurity from the synthesis of ethcathinone.

== See also ==
- Ethcathinone
- Filenadol
- M-ALPHA
- 2-Oxo-PCE
