= NEFA =

NEFA may refer to:

- NEFA (drug), an NMDA antagonist
- New England Foundation for the Arts
- Non-esterified fatty acid; see Fatty acid § Free fatty acids
- New England Freedom Association
- North-East Frontier Agency
