= 3-HO-PCE =

Dissociative designer drug

Clinical data
- Other names: 3-HO-PCE; 3-Hydroxyeticyclidine; Hydroxyeticyclidine
- Drug class: Dissociative; Hallucinogen
- ATC code: None

Legal status
- Legal status: DE: NpSG (Industrial and scientific use only); UK: Class B; Illegal in Turkey and Switzerland

Identifiers
- IUPAC name: 3-[1-(Ethylamino)cyclohexyl]phenol
- CAS Number: 2243815-20-3
- PubChem CID: 137332171
- ChemSpider: 81367248
- UNII: BB7HFF5XW2
- CompTox Dashboard (EPA): DTXSID301343068

Chemical and physical data
- Formula: C_{14}H_{21}NO
- Molar mass: 219.328 g·mol^{−1}
- 3D model (JSmol): Interactive image
- SMILES: CCNC1(CCCCC1)c1cccc(O)c1
- InChI: InChI=1S/C14H21NO/c1-2-15-14(9-4-3-5-10-14)12-7-6-8-13(16)11-12/h6-8,11,15-16H,2-5,9-10H2,1H3; Key:MIKNPNLBFHVMKK-UHFFFAOYSA-N

3-Hydroxyeticyclidine (3-HO-PCE) is a novel dissociative drug of the arylcyclohexylamine class, related to phencyclidine. It was first identified as a novel psychoactive substance in Sweden in 2017, and has subsequently been sold online as a research chemical. The toxicity and long-term safety profile of 3-HO-PCE is unknown as it has a very limited history of use, although one study indicates moderate potential toxicity.

== Use and effects ==
Early reports speculate that the dissociative effects may be described as "lying halfway between 3-MeO-PCP and 3-MeO-PCE."

== Toxicity ==
An in silico Study analyzing potential risks of 3-HO-PCE, along with other related substances, found multiple potential risks. One such risk was a high probability of hERG blockades, suggesting that QT-prolongation could be present in use. The lungs, liver, and blood were all found to be prominent likely toxicity targets of this class of drugs.

The LD_{50} of 3-HO-PCE and related substances in rats was consistently between 200-630mg/kg orally, indicating moderate oral toxicity.

== Pharmacology ==
=== Pharmacodynamics ===
3-HO-PCE is known to block NMDA receptors, although little is known regarding its unique pharmacology.

=== Pharmacokinetics ===
A study comprehensively reviewed the metabolism of 3-HO-PCE by using human liver microsomes and samples, both biological and non-biological, from a volunteer.

The first major metabolic pathway involves N-dealkylation, yielding the primary amine metabolite 3-HO-PCA. The second pathway causes the molecule to undergo oxidation, creating phenol-3-HO-PCE and hydroxy-3-HO-PCE. These compounds then undergo dehydration, creating dehydro-3-HO-PCE (which is also created directly from the parent compound via dehydrogenation). The third pathway causes the parent compound to undergo oxidative deamination, creating 1-(3'-hydroxyphenyl) cyclohexanol. This compound can either undergo oxidation and dehydrogenation to form dihydroxy-[1,1'-bi(cyclohexan)]-1-en-3-one, or a pathway involving dehydration and allylic oxidation to eventually form 3'4'-dihydro-[1,1'-biphenyl]-3-ol. The fourth pathway is phase II conjugation, where the parent compound undergoes O-glucuronidation to form 3-OGlu-PCE.

== Chemistry ==
3-HO-PCE is composed of a central cyclohexane ring, substituted at the C1 position with an N-ethyl chain and a 3-hydroxyphenyl group. It is the 3-hydroxy analogue of PCE.

== Society and culture ==
=== Legal status ===
3-HO-PCE is illegal in Germany under the NpSG act, which serves as a blanket ban for various research chemicals.

It is also a controlled substance in the United Kingdom, Turkey, and Switzerland.

== See also ==
- Arylcyclohexylamine
- 3-HO-PCP
- 3-MeO-PCE
- O-PCE
