= N-Ethylnorketamine =

Chemical compound

Clinical data
- ATC code: none

Legal status
- Legal status: CA: Schedule I; DE: NpSG (Industrial and scientific use only); UK: Class B

Identifiers
- IUPAC name: 2-(2-Chlorophenyl)-2-(ethylamino)cyclohexan-1-one
- CAS Number: 1354634-10-8
- PubChem CID: 57483649
- ChemSpider: 35805667
- UNII: TLL3802A3P
- CompTox Dashboard (EPA): DTXSID501030493

Chemical and physical data
- Formula: C_{14}H_{18}ClNO
- Molar mass: 251.75 g·mol^{−1}
- 3D model (JSmol): Interactive image
- SMILES: Clc2ccccc2C1(NCC)CCCCC1=O
- InChI: InChI=1S/C14H18ClNO/c1-2-16-14(10-6-5-9-13(14)17)11-7-3-4-8-12(11)15/h3-4,7-8,16H,2,5-6,9-10H2,1H3; Key:ITBBBZIIFJJMDU-UHFFFAOYSA-N

N-Ethylnorketamine (ethketamine, NENK, 2-Cl-2'-Oxo-PCE) is a designer drug which is presumed to have similar properties to ketamine, a dissociative anesthetic drug with hallucinogenic and sedative effects. It has been sold over the internet since around September 2012, and identified in seized drug samples by analytical laboratories in the UK and other European countries.

It is an NMDA receptor antagonist. In mice its antidepressant effects are dependent on activation of AMPA and 5-HT2 receptors, as blocking those abolishes said activity.

== Legal Status ==
As of October 2015 NENK is a controlled substance in the United Kingdom, China, and the US state of Alabama.
