= F-17475 =

Clinical data
- Drug class: NMDA receptor antagonist; Analgesic; Dissociative; Hallucinogen
- ATC code: None

Identifiers
- IUPAC name: (1R,3R)-3-amino-N,N-diethyl-1-phenylcyclobutane-1-carboxamide
- CAS Number: 1612885-86-5
- PubChem CID: 76071622
- ChemSpider: 70099827

Chemical and physical data
- Formula: C_{15}H_{22}N_{2}O
- Molar mass: 246.354 g·mol^{−1}
- 3D model (JSmol): Interactive image
- SMILES: CCN(CC)C(=O)[C@@]1(C[C@@H](N)C1)c1ccccc1
- InChI: InChI=1S/C15H22N2O/c1-3-17(4-2)14(18)15(10-13(16)11-15)12-8-6-5-7-9-12/h5-9,13H,3-4,10-11,16H2,1-2H3; Key:OVAIACNINHMYRO-UHFFFAOYSA-N

F-17475 is an NMDA receptor antagonist described as an analgesic, which was under development for the treatment of postoperative pain but was never marketed.

The drug shows similar affinity for the NMDA receptor as ketamine (K_{i} = 0.74 and 1.05 μM, respectively). It shows analgesic effects in rodents, with about twice the potency of ketamine, and potentiates morphine-induced analgesia. F-17475 substitutes for ketamine in rodent drug discrimination tests, suggesting that it may have dissociative hallucinogen effects in humans. However, F-17475 showed a greater margin of analgesic to dissociative-like effects than ketamine in rodents.

F-17475 was first described in the patent literature by 2012, developed by researchers at Pierre Fabre. The m-chloro derivative is slightly more potent, up to 10x stronger than ketamine, but had a less favorable side effect profile in animal tests.
