= 4-Keto-PCP =

Chemical compound

Identifiers
- IUPAC name: 4-phenyl-4-piperidin-1-ylcyclohexan-1-one
- CAS Number: 65620-13-5
- PubChem CID: 13306756
- CompTox Dashboard (EPA): DTXSID601336915

Chemical and physical data
- Formula: C_{17}H_{23}NO
- Molar mass: 257.377 g·mol^{−1}
- 3D model (JSmol): Interactive image
- SMILES: C1CCN(CC1)C2(CCC(=O)CC2)C3=CC=CC=C3
- InChI: InChI=1S/C17H23NO/c19-16-9-11-17(12-10-16,15-7-3-1-4-8-15)18-13-5-2-6-14-18/h1,3-4,7-8H,2,5-6,9-14H2; Key:HBVUBDNRZWJTSB-UHFFFAOYSA-N

4-Keto-PCP is a recreational designer drug from the arylcyclohexylamine family, with dissociative effects. It has potency in between that of ketamine and phencyclidine but with somewhat more sedating effects in animal studies. It has been shown to induce self administration in animals, suggesting reinforcing effects.

== See also ==
- 3-HO-PCP
- 3-Fluoro-PCP
- Bromadol
- Dimetamine
- Methoxetamine
