= PCPr =

Chemical compound

Clinical data
- ATC code: none

Legal status
- Legal status: CA: Schedule III; DE: Anlage I (Authorized scientific use only); UK: Class B

Identifiers
- IUPAC name: 1-phenyl-N-propylcyclohexanamine
- CAS Number: 18949-81-0
- ChemSpider: 521518
- UNII: 6H9B5S0I6S
- CompTox Dashboard (EPA): DTXSID20172359

Chemical and physical data
- Formula: C_{15}H_{23}N
- Molar mass: 217.356 g·mol^{−1}
- 3D model (JSmol): Interactive image
- SMILES: N(CCC)C2(c1ccccc1)CCCCC2
- InChI: InChI=1S/C15H23N/c1-2-13-16-15(11-7-4-8-12-15)14-9-5-3-6-10-14/h3,5-6,9-10,16H,2,4,7-8,11-13H2,1H3; Key:KHXNTQRMMGXPQW-UHFFFAOYSA-N

PCPr is an arylcyclohexylamine dissociative anesthetic drug with hallucinogenic and stimulant effects. It is around the same potency as phencyclidine, although slightly less potent than the ethyl homologue eticyclidine, and has reportedly been sold as a designer drug in Germany and other European countries since the late 1990s.

Several other related derivatives have also been encountered, with the n-propyl group of PCPr replaced by a 2-methoxyethyl, 2-ethoxyethyl or 3-methoxypropyl group to form PCMEA, PCEEA and PCMPA respectively.

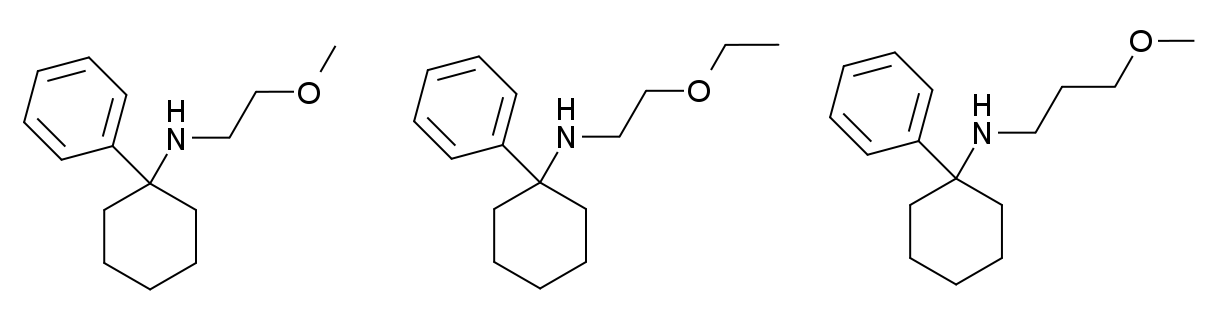
PCMEA, PCEEA and PCMPA
