= Tenocyclidine =

Chemical compound

Clinical data
- ATC code: none

Legal status
- Legal status: AU: S9 (Prohibited substance); BR: Class F2 (Prohibited psychotropics); CA: Schedule III; DE: Anlage I (Authorized scientific use only); UK: Class A; US: Schedule I; UN: Psychotropic Schedule I

Identifiers
- IUPAC name: 1-(1-(2-Thienyl)cyclohexyl)piperidine
- CAS Number: 21500-98-1
- PubChem CID: 62751
- DrugBank: DB01520
- ChemSpider: 56495
- UNII: 8BQ45Q6VCL
- KEGG: D12702
- ChEMBL: ChEMBL279676
- CompTox Dashboard (EPA): DTXSID3046168

Chemical and physical data
- Formula: C_{15}H_{23}NS
- Molar mass: 249.42 g·mol^{−1}
- 3D model (JSmol): Interactive image
- SMILES: C1(C2(CCCCC2)N3CCCCC3)=CC=CS1
- InChI: InChI=1S/C15H23NS/c1-3-9-15(10-4-1,14-8-7-13-17-14)16-11-5-2-6-12-16/h7-8,13H,1-6,9-12H2; Key:JUZZEWSCNBCFRL-UHFFFAOYSA-N

Tenocyclidine (TCP) is a dissociative anesthetic with psychostimulant effects. It was discovered by a team at Parke-Davis in the late 1950s. It is similar in effects to phencyclidine (PCP) but is considerably more potent. TCP has slightly different binding properties to PCP, with more affinity for the NMDA receptors, but less affinity for the sigma receptors. Because of its high affinity for the PCP site of the NMDA receptor complex, the ^{3}H radiolabelled form of TCP is widely used in research into NMDA receptors.

TCP acts primarily as an NMDA receptor antagonist which blocks the activity of the NMDA receptor, however its increased psychostimulant effects compared to PCP suggests it also has relatively greater activity as a dopamine reuptake inhibitor (DRI). Due to its similarity in effects to PCP, TCP was placed into the Schedule I list of illegal drugs in the 1970s, although it was only briefly used in the 1970s and 1980s and is now little known.

== See also ==
- Arylcyclohexylamine
- Benocyclidine (BTCP)
