= Benocyclidine =

Chemical compound

Clinical data
- ATC code: none

Legal status
- Legal status: UK: Under Psychoactive Substances Act; US: Unscheduled, illegal in Florida and Virginia

Identifiers
- IUPAC name: 1-[1-(1-Benzothiophen-2-yl)cyclohexyl]piperidine
- CAS Number: 112726-66-6
- PubChem CID: 123692
- ChemSpider: 110266
- UNII: Q1WR6UP7MW
- ChEMBL: ChEMBL279556
- CompTox Dashboard (EPA): DTXSID0042581

Chemical and physical data
- Formula: C_{19}H_{25}NS
- Molar mass: 299.48 g·mol^{−1}
- 3D model (JSmol): Interactive image
- SMILES: C1(SC(C2(CCCCC2)N3CCCCC3)=C4)=C4C=CC=C1
- InChI: InChI=1S/C19H25NS/c1-5-11-19(12-6-1,20-13-7-2-8-14-20)18-15-16-9-3-4-10-17(16)21-18/h3-4,9-10,15H,1-2,5-8,11-14H2; Key:RGSVXQJPSWZXOP-UHFFFAOYSA-N

Benocyclidine, also known as benzothiophenylcyclohexylpiperidine (BTCP), is a psychoactive recreational drug of the arylcyclohexylamine class which is related to phencyclidine (PCP). It was first described in a patent application naming Marc Caron and colleagues at Duke University in 1997.

It acts as a potent and selective dopamine reuptake inhibitor (DRI) and a psychostimulant. Unlike related compounds like phencyclidine and ketamine, benocyclidine is a pure DRI with negligible affinity for the NMDA receptor, and it therefore lacks any anticonvulsant, anesthetic, hallucinogenic, or dissociative effects. It has been used to label the dopamine transporter. BCP was used to try to find a common pharmacophore for DRI type stimulants.

More recently, benocyclidine has been found in several ecstasy tablets, sold as MDMA.

== Legal status in the United States ==
Benocyclidine is a Schedule I controlled substance in the state of Florida and Virginia, making it illegal to buy, sell, or possess in these states.

Otherwise, benocyclidine is not scheduled at the federal level in the United States, but may be considered an analog of PCP, in which case purchase, sale, or possession could be prosecuted under the Federal Analog Act if intended for human consumption.

== See also ==
- Tenocyclidine
