= 4-Dimethylamino-4-(p-tolyl)cyclohexanone =

Synthetic opioid

Clinical data
- ATC code: None

Identifiers
- IUPAC name: 4-(Dimethylamino)-4-(4-methylphenyl)cyclohexan-1-one
- CAS Number: 65619-06-9
- PubChem CID: 12595643
- ChemSpider: 15036994
- UNII: 84WTJ4H57H
- ChEMBL: ChEMBL341983
- CompTox Dashboard (EPA): DTXSID30503812

Chemical and physical data
- Formula: C_{15}H_{21}NO
- Molar mass: 231.339 g·mol^{−1}
- 3D model (JSmol): Interactive image
- SMILES: CC1=CC=C(C=C1)C2(CCC(=O)CC2)N(C)C
- InChI: InChI=1S/C15H21NO/c1-12-4-6-13(7-5-12)15(16(2)3)10-8-14(17)9-11-15/h4-7H,8-11H2,1-3H3; Key:VCEODKLEIJWHMI-UHFFFAOYSA-N

4-Dimethylamino-4-(p-tolyl)cyclohexanone (sometimes known as dimetamine) is a opioid analgesic with an arylcyclohexylamine chemical structure. It was developed by Daniel Lednicer at Upjohn in the 1970s. It has around the same analgesic potency as morphine, with analogues where the para-methyl group is replaced by a halogen being slightly weaker. Derivatives where the ketone group has been reacted with a Grignard reagent to add a phenethyl side chain are several hundred times stronger (as is seen in the compound BDPC).

== Legal Status ==
4-Dimethylamino-4-(p-tolyl)cyclohexanone is specifically listed as an illegal drug in Latvia. It is also covered by drug analogue laws in various jurisdictions as a generic arylcyclohexylamine derivative.

== See also ==
- 3-HO-PCP
- 4-Keto-PCP
- Tramadol
