= 3-MeO-PCP =

Chemical compound

Clinical data
- ATC code: None

Legal status
- Legal status: BR: Class F2 (Prohibited psychotropics); CA: Schedule I; DE: Anlage II (Authorized trade only, not prescriptible); UK: Class B; US: Schedule I; UN: Psychotropic Schedule II; Illegal in the Czech Republic and Sweden

Identifiers
- IUPAC name: 1-[1-(3-methoxyphenyl)cyclohexyl]-piperidine
- CAS Number: 72242-03-6 91164-58-8 (hydrochloride)
- PubChem CID: 11778080
- ChemSpider: 9952762
- UNII: 28A91R606X
- KEGG: C22809
- CompTox Dashboard (EPA): DTXSID50222578

Chemical and physical data
- Formula: C_{18}H_{27}NO
- Molar mass: 273.420 g·mol^{−1}
- 3D model (JSmol): Interactive image
- SMILES: COc3cccc(c3)C1(CCCCC1)N2CCCCC2
- InChI: InChI=1S/C18H27NO/c1-20-17-10-8-9-16(15-17)18(11-4-2-5-12-18)19-13-6-3-7-14-19/h8-10,15H,2-7,11-14H2,1H3; Key:BQQSZHHKGPOXLN-UHFFFAOYSA-N

3-Methoxyphencyclidine (3-MeO-PCP) is a dissociative anesthetic of the arylcyclohexylamine class structurally related to PCP. It has been sold online as a designer drug. It has been used across Europe and the United States. It acts mainly as an NMDA receptor antagonist, though it has also been found to interact with the sigma σ_{1} receptor and the serotonin transporter.

== Pharmacology ==
=== Pharmacodynamics ===
3-MeO-PCP has a K_{i} of 20 nM for the PCP site of the NMDA receptor, which is higher than PCP or any other anisyl substition of PCP. It has secondary activity at multiple other receptors, with a K_{i} of 216 nM for the serotonin transporter (SERT), and 42 nM for the sigma σ_{1} receptor. It does not bind to the norepinephrine or dopamine transporter, nor to the sigma σ_{2} receptor (K_{i} >10,000 nM).

Based on structural similarity to 3-HO-PCP, it was initially expected that 3-MeO-PCP may have opioid activity. However, radioligand binding assays confirmed that the drug lacks significant activity at μ-, δ-, or κ-opioid receptors.

=== Pharmacokinetics ===
As of 2018, controlled clinical studies have not been performed in humans but the elimination half-life is estimated to be between 10 and 11 hours.

== Chemistry ==
3-MeO-PCP hydrochloride is a white crystalline solid with a melting point of 204–205 °C.

== History ==
3-MeO-PCP was first synthesized in 1979 to investigate the structure–activity relationships of phencyclidine (PCP) derivatives. The effects of 3-MeO-PCP in humans were not described until 1999 when a chemist using the pseudonym John Q. Beagle wrote that 3-MeO-PCP was qualitatively similar to PCP with comparable potency. Interest in gray-market dissociates accelerated in 2008, when an online research chemical vendor began offering the less potent 4-MeO-PCP. In 2009, a Swiss chemist described the effects of taking the drug on the Bluelight forums. 3-MeO-PCP first became available as a research chemical in 2011. The drug was first reported to the European Monitoring Centre for Drugs and Drug Addiction by the UK on March 29, 2012.

== Society and culture ==
=== Recreational use ===
3-MeO-PCP has been more widely reported than many other similar grey market arylcyclohexylamines. 3-MeO-PCP has been available for purchase online as a research chemical. Use has been reported across Europe and the United States.

3-MeO-PCP is usually taken orally or nasally, but can also be injected or smoked. Duration and onset of effects varies depending on route of administration. When taken orally, onset takes 30–90 minutes and effects last 4–8 hours, generally peaking at 2-3 hours. Its effects are described as being similar to related dissociatives such as PCP.

Being slightly more potent than PCP, threshold doses starts at 1 mg, with substantial dissociative effects starting at 5 mg. Strong dissociative effects are seen at 10-20 mg. It has been described as producing more euphoria and mental clarity than similar drugs. Negative effects include hypertension, tachycardia, confusion, and disorientation. In one case of an individual taking a very large oral dose (300–500 mg), psychosis and aggressive behaviors, followed by amnesia were observed.

As of 2022, there has been two known deaths that can be attributed to 3-MeO-PCP alone; one in Sweden and one in the UK. There were 14 additional deaths where 3-MeO-PCP was detected in the blood post-mortem.

=== Legal status ===
==== United Kingdom ====
On October 18, 2012, the Advisory Council on the Misuse of Drugs in the United Kingdom released a report about methoxetamine, saying that the "harms of methoxetamine are commensurate with Class B of the Misuse of Drugs Act (1971)". The report went on to suggest that all analogues of MXE should also become class B drugs and suggested a catch-all clause covering both existing and unresearched arylcyclohexylamines, including 3-MeO-PCP.

==== United States ====
3-MeO-PCP is not a controlled substance in the United States but possession or distribution of 3-MeO-PCP for human use could potentially be prosecuted under the Federal Analogue Act due to its structural and pharmacological similarities to PCP.

==== Canada ====
Canada's Controlled Drugs And Substances Act has placed all PCP analogues, derivatives, salts and further children thereof under a Schedule 1 prohibition, alongside opioids, cocaine and other top-ranked illegal psychoactive substances. As such, 3-MeO-PCP is automatically banned, although it is not mentioned by name in the schedule. Only PCP and Ketamine are specifically written in.

==== Sweden ====
3-MeO-PCP is a controlled substance in Sweden.

==== Czech Republic ====
3-MeO-PCP is banned in the Czech Republic.

==== Chile ====
As per Chile's Ley de drogas, aka Ley 20000, all esters and ethers of PCP are illegal. As 3-MeO-PCP is an ether of PCP, it is thus illegal.

==== Portugal ====
3-MeO-PCP is neither a salt nor an isomer of PCP, not making it illegal.

== See also ==
- Dexanabinol
- Ketamine
- 3-MeO-PCE
- 3-MeO-PCMo
- 3-HO-PCE
- MDPCP
- Methoxyketamine
