= Eticyclidine =

Medication

Clinical data
- ATC code: none

Legal status
- Legal status: AU: S9 (Prohibited substance); BR: Class F2 (Prohibited psychotropics); CA: Schedule III; DE: Anlage I (Authorized scientific use only); UK: Class B; US: Schedule I; UN: Psychotropic Schedule I

Identifiers
- IUPAC name: N-Ethyl-1-phenylcyclohexylamine
- CAS Number: 2201-15-2
- PubChem CID: 16622
- ChemSpider: 15759
- UNII: O8I1LL6A89
- KEGG: C22716
- ChEMBL: ChEMBL279924
- CompTox Dashboard (EPA): DTXSID2062248

Chemical and physical data
- Formula: C_{14}H_{21}N
- Molar mass: 203.329 g·mol^{−1}
- 3D model (JSmol): Interactive image
- SMILES: CCNC1(CCCCC1)C2=CC=CC=C2
- InChI: InChI=1S/C14H21N/c1-2-15-14(11-7-4-8-12-14)13-9-5-3-6-10-13/h3,5-6,9-10,15H,2,4,7-8,11-12H2,1H3; Key:IFYLVUHLOOCYBG-UHFFFAOYSA-N

PCE (Eticyclidine, CI-400) is a dissociative anesthetic drug with hallucinogenic effects. It is similar in effects to phencyclidine but is slightly more potent. PCE was developed by Parke-Davis in the 1970s and evaluated for anesthetic potential under the code name CI-400, but research into PCE was not continued after the development of ketamine, a similar drug with more favourable properties. Due to its similarity in effects to PCP, PCE was placed into the Schedule 1 list of illegal drugs in the 1970s, although it was only briefly abused in the 1970s and 1980s and is now little known.

== See also ==
- Arylcyclohexylamine
- 3-MeO-PCE
- 3-MeO-PCP
- 4-MeO-PCP
- Phencyclidine
- PCPr
- Methoxetamine
