= PRE-084 =

Chemical compound

Clinical data
- ATC code: none

Identifiers
- IUPAC name: 2-morpholin-4-ylethyl 1-phenylcyclohexane-1-carboxylate
- CAS Number: 138847-85-5
- PubChem CID: 126402
- IUPHAR/BPS: 6678
- ChemSpider: 112335
- UNII: 74BW8WG2MQ
- CompTox Dashboard (EPA): DTXSID40160819

Chemical and physical data
- Formula: C_{19}H_{27}NO_{3}
- Molar mass: 317.429 g·mol^{−1}
- 3D model (JSmol): Interactive image
- SMILES: c1ccccc1C2(CCCCC2)C(=O)OCCN3CCOCC3
- InChI: InChI=1S/C19H27NO3/c21-18(23-16-13-20-11-14-22-15-12-20)19(9-5-2-6-10-19)17-7-3-1-4-8-17/h1,3-4,7-8H,2,5-6,9-16H2; Key:RQHKZUBCUZVZEF-UHFFFAOYSA-N

PRE-084 is a sigma receptor agonist, selective for the σ_{1} subtype. It has nootropic and antidepressant actions in animal studies, as well as antitussive and reinforcing effects. PRE-084 increases the expression of GDNF.
