= Filenadol =

Chemical compound

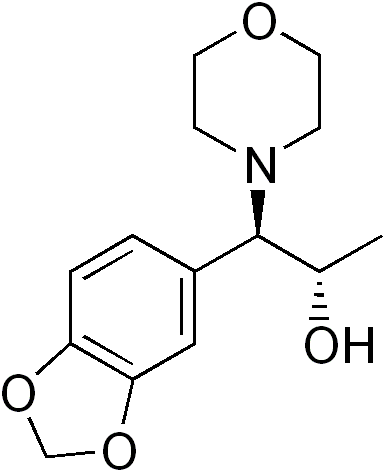

Clinical data
- Other names: (±)-erythro-1-(3,4-methylenedioxyphenyl)-1-morpholinopropan-2-ol
- ATC code: None

Identifiers
- IUPAC name: (1R,2S)-1-(1,3-benzodioxol-5-yl)-1-(4-morpholinyl)-2-propanol
- CAS Number: 78168-92-0
- PubChem CID: 71224
- ChemSpider: 64359
- UNII: YFT8T83CF9
- ChEMBL: ChEMBL2104364
- CompTox Dashboard (EPA): DTXSID601024623

Chemical and physical data
- Formula: C_{14}H_{19}NO_{4}
- Molar mass: 265.309 g·mol^{−1}
- 3D model (JSmol): Interactive image
- SMILES: O[C@H]([C@H](N1CCOCC1)c3ccc2OCOc2c3)C
- InChI: InChI=1S/C14H19NO4/c1-10(16)14(15-4-6-17-7-5-15)11-2-3-12-13(8-11)19-9-18-12/h2-3,8,10,14,16H,4-7,9H2,1H3/t10-,14-/m0/s1; Key:KFSXLIJSXOJBCB-HZMBPMFUSA-N

Filenadol (INN; Filantor; FI-2024) is an analgesic drug with antinociceptive and antiinflammatory properties.
