= NEFA (drug) =

Chemical compound

Identifiers
- IUPAC name: (4aR,9aS)-N-Ethyl-4,4a,9,9a-tetrahydro-1H-fluoren-4a-amine
- CAS Number: 127140-88-9
- PubChem CID: 57426056
- UNII: JMF9RU2BLC
- CompTox Dashboard (EPA): DTXSID101027127

Chemical and physical data
- Formula: C_{15}H_{19}N
- Molar mass: 213.324 g·mol^{−1}
- 3D model (JSmol): Interactive image
- SMILES: CCN[C@]12CC=CC[C@H]1CC3=CC=CC=C23
- InChI: InChI=1S/C15H19N/c1-2-16-15-10-6-5-8-13(15)11-12-7-3-4-9-14(12)15/h3-7,9,13,16H,2,8,10-11H2,1H3/t13-,15+/m0/s1; Key:DRCWOKJLSQUJPZ-DZGCQCFKSA-N

NEFA is a moderate affinity NMDA antagonist (IC_{50} = 0.51 μM). It is a structural analog of phencyclidine. It was first synthesized by a team at Parke-Davis in the late 1950s.
