= Research chemical =

Substance used for scientific and medical research purposes

Research chemicals are chemical substances which scientists use for medical and scientific research purposes. One characteristic of a research chemical is that it is for laboratory research use only; a research chemical is not intended for human or veterinary use.

== Background ==
=== Agricultural research chemicals ===
Research agrochemicals are created and evaluated to select effective substances for commercial off-the-shelf end-user products. Many research agrochemicals are never publicly marketed. Agricultural research chemicals often use sequential code names.

== See also ==
- Lists of investigational drugs

== See also ==
• Designer drug
