= Methoxetamine =

Dissociative drug

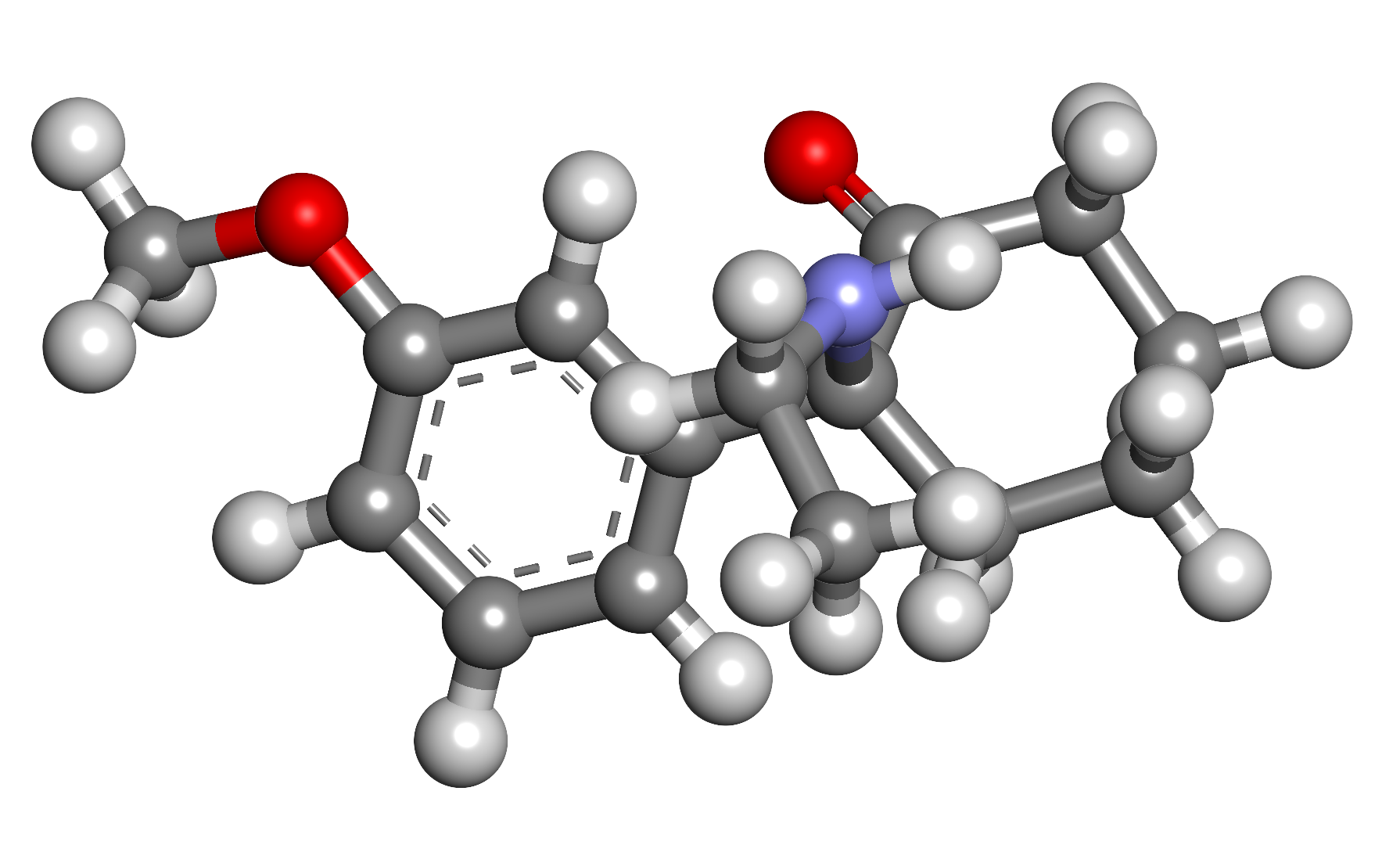

Clinical data
- Other names: MXE; 3-MeO-2'-oxo-PCE
- Addiction liability: High
- Drug class: NMDA receptor antagonist; Dissociative hallucinogen; General anesthetic
- ATC code: None

Legal status
- Legal status: BR: Class F2 (Prohibited psychotropics); DE: Anlage I (Authorized scientific use only); UK: Class B; US: Schedule I; UN: Psychotropic Schedule II

Pharmacokinetic data
- Elimination half-life: 3–6 hours

Identifiers
- IUPAC name: (R/S)-2-(3-Methoxyphenyl)-2-(ethylamino)cyclohexanone
- CAS Number: 1239943-76-0
- PubChem CID: 52911279
- ChemSpider: 24721792
- UNII: ZO5ZCE6E12
- KEGG: C22711
- CompTox Dashboard (EPA): DTXSID301009327

Chemical and physical data
- Formula: C_{15}H_{21}NO_{2}
- Molar mass: 247.338 g·mol^{−1}
- 3D model (JSmol): Interactive image
- SMILES: O=C1CCCCC1(C2=CC=CC(OC)=C2)NCC
- InChI: InChI=1S/C15H21NO2/c1-3-16-15(10-5-4-9-14(15)17)12-7-6-8-13(11-12)18-2/h6-8,11,16H,3-5,9-10H2,1-2H3; Key:LPKTWLVEGBNOOX-UHFFFAOYSA-N

Methoxetamine (MXE) is a dissociative hallucinogen that has been sold as a designer drug. It differs from many dissociatives such as ketamine and phencyclidine (PCP) that were developed as pharmaceutical drugs for use as general anesthetics in that it was designed specifically to increase the antidepressant effects of ketamine.

MXE is an arylcyclohexylamine. It acts mainly as an NMDA receptor antagonist, similarly to other arylcyclohexylamines like ketamine and PCP.

== Recreational use ==
=== Effects ===
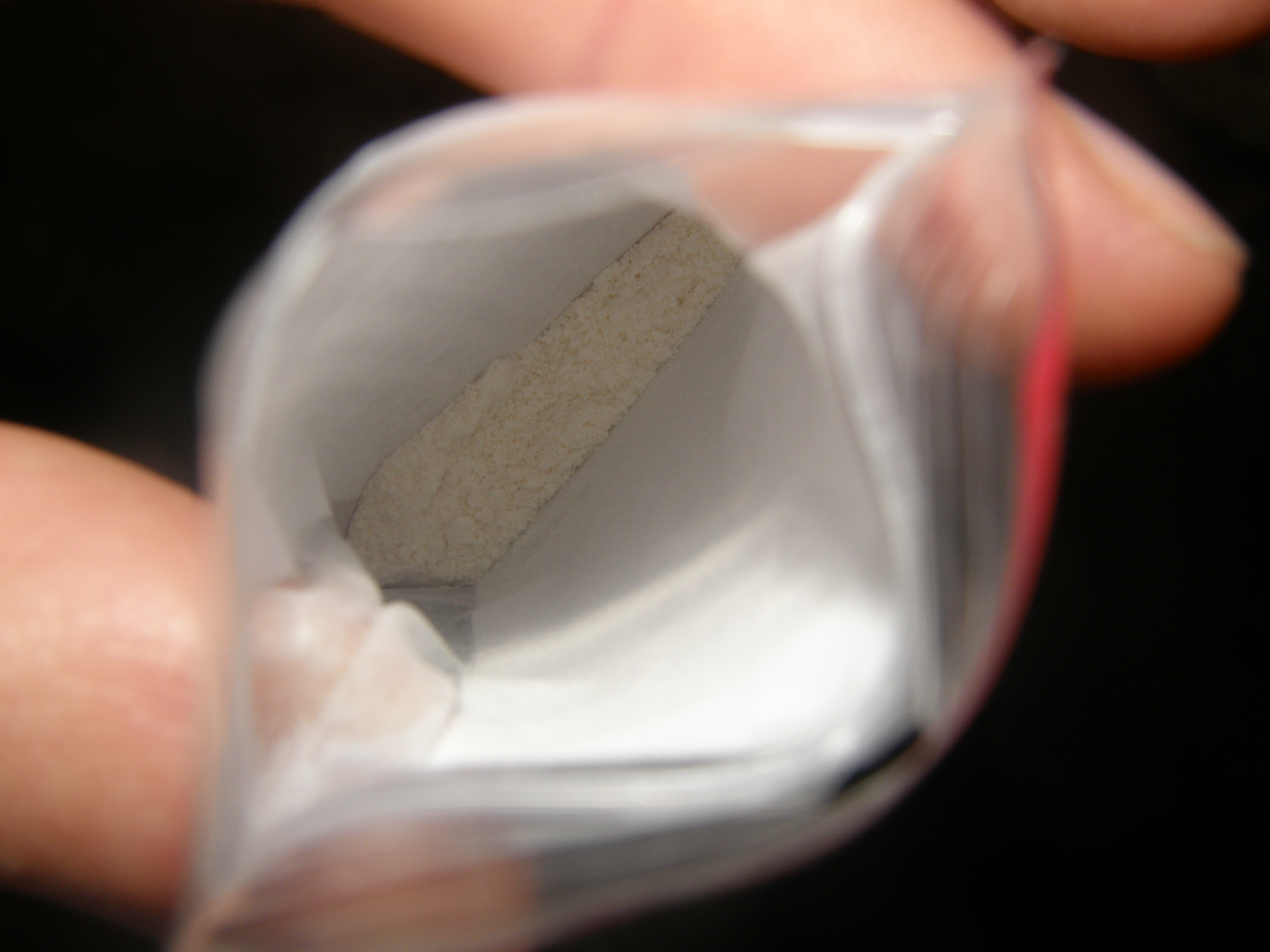
Methoxetamine powder.

MXE is reported to have a similar effect to ketamine. It was often believed to possess opioid properties due to its structural similarity to 3-HO-PCP, but this assumption is not supported by data, which shows insignificant affinity for the μ-opioid receptor by the compound. Recreational use of MXE has been associated with hospitalizations from high and/or combined consumption in the US and UK. Acute reversible cerebellar toxicity has been documented in three cases of hospital admission due to MXE overdose, lasting for between one and four days after exposure.

MXE was designed in part in an attempt to avoid the urotoxicity associated with ketamine abuse; it was thought the compound's increased potency and reduced dose would limit the accumulation of urotoxic metabolites in the bladder. Like ketamine, MXE has been found to produce bladder inflammation and fibrosis after high dose chronic administration in mice, although the dosages used were quite large. Reports of urotoxicity in humans have yet to appear in the medical literature.

== Pharmacology ==
=== Pharmacodynamics ===
Methoxetamine
Site	K_{i} (nM)	Action	Species	Ref
NMDA (PCP)	259	Antagonist	Human	
MOR	>10,000	ND	Human	
DOR	>10,000	ND	Human	
KOR	>10,000	ND	Human	
NOP	>10,000	ND	Human	
σ_{1}	>10,000	ND	Guinea pig	
σ_{2}	>10,000	ND	Rat	
D_{2}	>10,000	ND	Human	
5-HT_{2A}	>10,000	ND	Human	
SERT	481; 2,400 (IC_{50})	Inhibitor	Human	
NET	>10,000; 20,000 (IC_{50})	Inhibitor	Human	
DAT	>10,000; 33,000 (IC_{50})	Inhibitor	Human	
Values are K_{i} (nM). The smaller the value, the more strongly the drug binds to the site.

MXE acts mainly as a selective and high-affinity NMDA receptor antagonist, specifically of the dizocilpine (MK-801) site (K_{i} = 257 nM). It produces ketamine-like effects. In addition to antagonism of the NMDA receptor, MXE has been found to act as a serotonin reuptake inhibitor (K_{i} = 479 nM; IC_{50} = 2,400 nM). Conversely, it shows little or no effect on the reuptake of dopamine and norepinephrine (K_{i} and IC_{50} > 10,000 nM). Nonetheless, MXE has been found to activate dopaminergic neurotransmission, including in the mesolimbic reward pathway. This is a characteristic that it shares with other NMDA receptor antagonists, including ketamine, PCP, and dizocilpine (MK-801). Animal studies suggest MXE may have rapidly-acting antidepressant effects similar to those of ketamine. A study that assessed binding of MXE at 56 sites including neurotransmitter receptors and transporters found that MXE had K_{i} values of >10,000 nM for all sites except the dizocilpine site of the NMDA receptor and the serotonin transporter (SERT).

=== Pharmacokinetics ===
MXE has a longer duration of action than that of ketamine.

== Chemistry ==
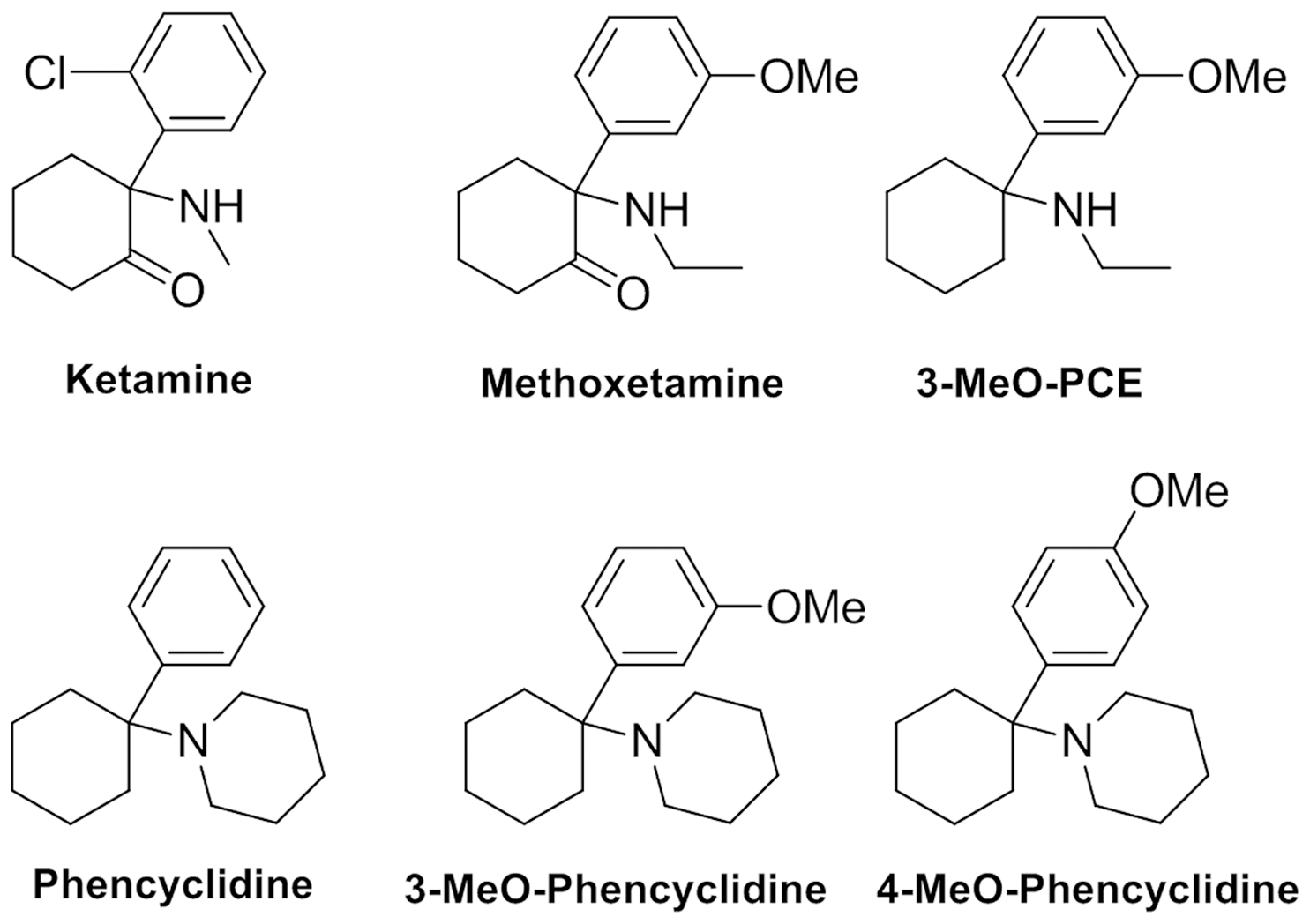
Methoxetamine and related arylcyclohexylamines.

MXE is an arylcyclohexylamine and a derivative of eticyclidine (PCE). It can also be thought of as the β-Keto-derivative of 3-methoxyeticyclidine (3-MeO-PCE), or the N-ethyl homologue of methoxmetamine (MXM) and methoxpropamine (MXPr). It is closely related structurally to ketamine, and more distantly to PCP.

MXE hydrochloride is soluble in ethanol up to 10 mg/ml at 25 °C.

=== Detection in body fluids ===
A forensic standard of MXE is available, and the compound has been posted on the Forendex website of potential drugs of abuse.

== History ==
The qualitative effects of MXE were first described online in May 2010 and the compound became commercially available on a small scale in September 2010. By November the use and sale of the MXE had increased enough for it to be formally identified by the European Monitoring Centre for Drugs and Drug Addiction. By July 2011, the EMCDDA had identified 58 websites selling the compound at a cost of 145–195 euros for 10 grams.

== Society and culture ==
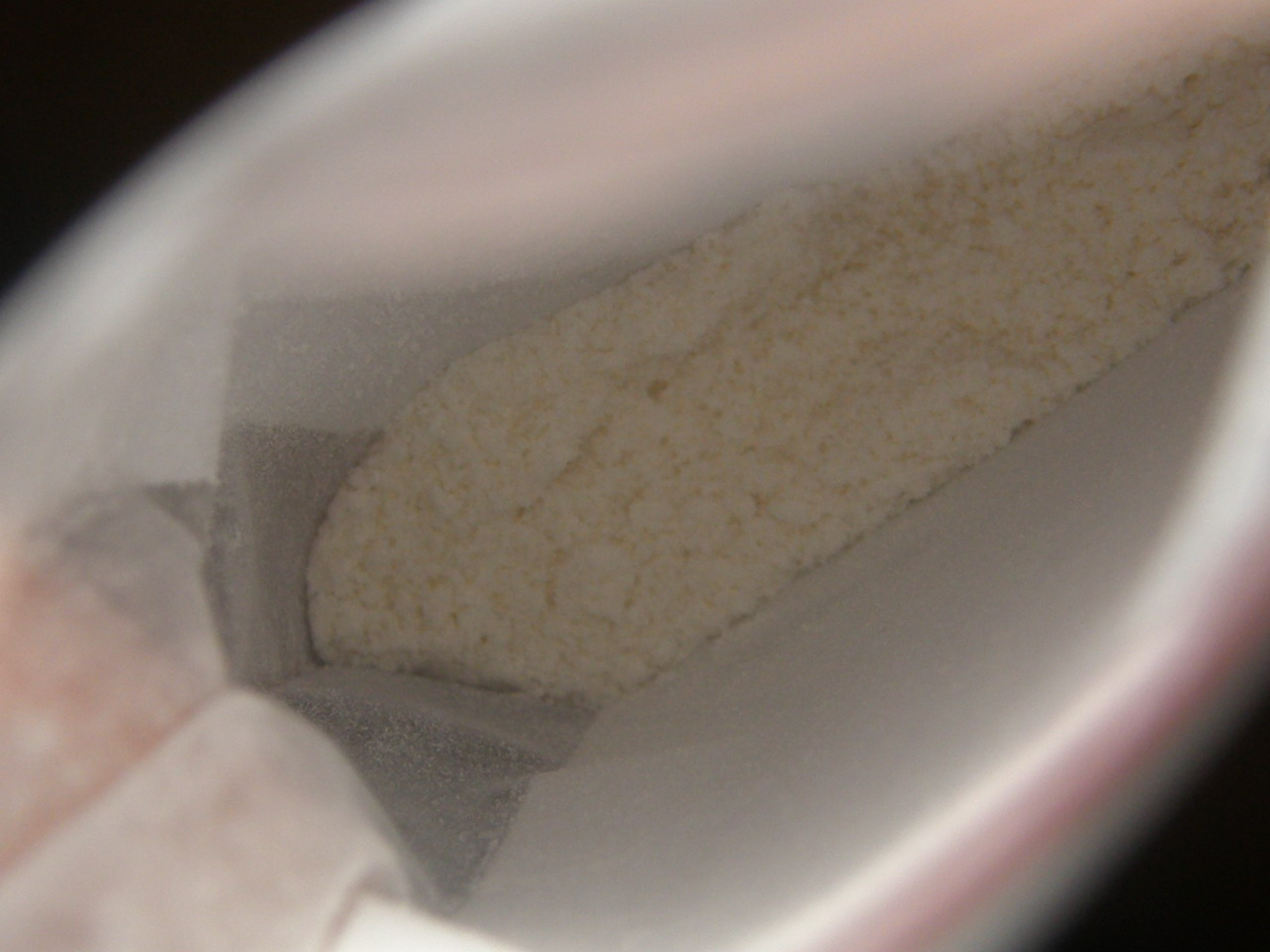
Methoxetamine powder.

=== Media coverage ===
Mixmag reported in January 2012, that people in the dance music and clubbing community have given MXE the slang name 'roflcoptr'. Vice commented that it was likely that the phrase will only be used by "the same politicians, parents and journalists" who called mephedrone 'meow meow'. After being called mexxy in UK Home Office press releases, the media adopted the name.

A literature review was published in March 2012 which looked at scientific literature and information on the web. It concluded that "the online availability of information on novel psychoactive drugs, such as MXE, may constitute a pressing public health challenge. Better international collaboration levels and novel forms of intervention are necessary to tackle this fast-growing phenomenon."

=== Legal status ===
==== Brazil ====
MXE became classified as a narcotic in Brazil in February 2014.

==== Canada ====
As of January 2011 MXE is a controlled substance in Canada.

==== China ====
As of October 2015 MXE is a controlled substance in China.

==== European Union ====
On 16 June 2014, the European Commission proposed that MXE be banned across the European Union, subjecting those in violation to criminal sanctions. This is following the procedure for risk-assessment and control of new psychoactive substances set up by the council: Decision 2005/387/JHA.

==== Finland ====
Scheduled in the "government decree on narcotic substances, preparations and plants" and is hence illegal.

==== Israel ====
MXE became classified as an illegal narcotic in Israel in May 2012.

==== Japan ====
MXE became a controlled substance in Japan from 1 July 2012, by amendment to the Pharmaceutical Affairs Law.

==== Poland ====
MXE is a controlled substance (group II-P) making it illegal to produce, sell or possess in The Republic of Poland as of 1 July 2015.

==== Russia ====
MXE has been a controlled substance in Russia since October 2011.

==== Sweden ====
MXE became classified as a narcotic in Sweden in late February 2012.

==== Switzerland ====
MXE has been illegal in Switzerland since December 2011.

==== United Kingdom ====
Prior to March 2012, MXE was not controlled by the UK's Misuse of Drugs Act. In March 2012, the Home Office referred MXE to the Advisory Council on the Misuse of Drugs for possible temporary controlling under the powers given in the Police Reform and Social Responsibility Act 2011. The ACMD gave their advice on 23 March, with the chair commenting that "the evidence shows that the use of methoxetamine can cause harm to users and the ACMD advises that it should be subject to a temporary class drug order." In April 2012, MXE was placed under temporary class drug control, which prohibited its import and sale for 12 months.

Theresa May commented in her reply to the ACMD that "the next step in this process is for the ACMD to undertake a full assessment of MXE for consideration for its permanent control under the 1971 Act." She goes on to say that she hopes the ACMD will do this as a part of the review of ketamine, "including its analogues" and that this review will be completed "within the 12 months from the making of the current order".

On 18 October 2012 the ACMD released a report about MXE, saying that the "harms of methoxetamine are commensurate with Class B of the Misuse of Drugs Act (1971)", despite the fact that the act does not classify drugs based on harm. The report went on to suggest that all analogues of MXE should also become class B drugs and suggested a catch-all clause covering both existing and unresearched arylcyclohexamines.

MXE ceased to be covered by the temporary prohibition on 26 February 2013, when it became classified as a Class B drug.

==== United Nations ====
MXE was made a schedule II drug in November 2016.

==== United States ====
On June 6, 2022, the U.S. Drug Enforcement Administration published a final rule placing MXE in Schedule I of the Controlled Substances Act.
