= NMDA receptor antagonist =

Class of anesthetics

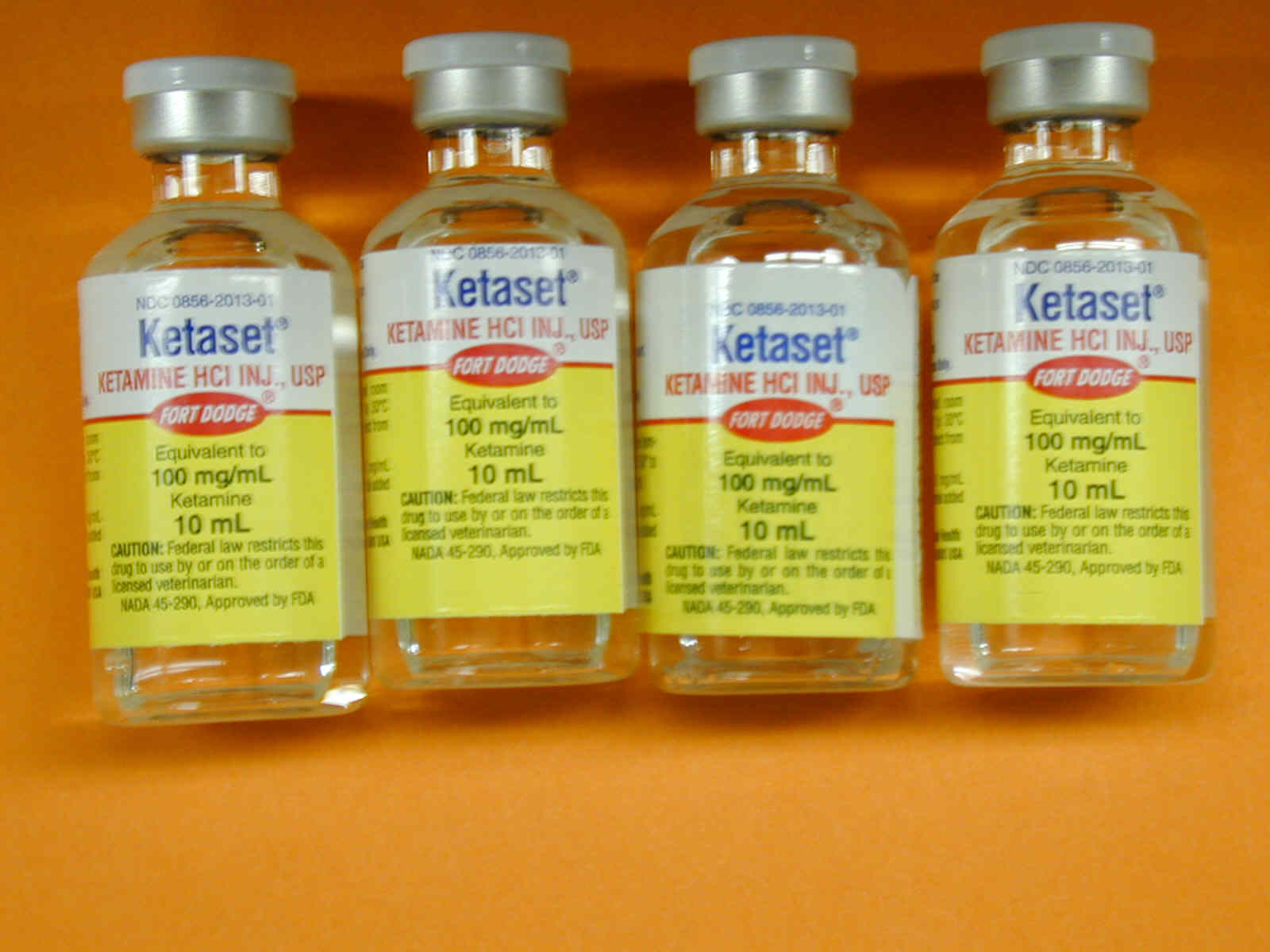
Ketamine, one of the most popular NMDA receptor antagonists

NMDA receptor antagonists are a class of drugs that work to antagonize, or inhibit the action of, the N-methyl-D-aspartate receptor (NMDAR). They are commonly used as anesthetics for humans and animals; the state of anesthesia they induce is referred to as dissociative anesthesia.

Several synthetic opioids function additionally as NMDAR-antagonists, such as pethidine, levorphanol, methadone, dextropropoxyphene, tramadol, and ketobemidone.

Some NMDA receptor antagonists, such as ketamine, dextromethorphan (DXM), phencyclidine (PCP), methoxetamine (MXE), and nitrous oxide (N_{2}O) are sometimes used recreationally for their dissociative, hallucinogenic, and euphoriant properties. When used recreationally, they are classified as dissociative drugs.

== Uses and effects ==
NMDA receptor antagonists induce a state called dissociative anesthesia, marked by catalepsy, amnesia, and analgesia. Ketamine is a favored anesthetic for emergency patients with unknown medical history and in the treatment of burn victims because it doesn't depress breathing and circulation nearly as much as other anesthetics. Dextrorphan, a metabolite of dextromethorphan (one of the most commonly used cough suppressants in the world), is known to be an NMDA receptor antagonist.

Numerous detrimental symptoms are linked to depressed NMDA receptor function. For example, NMDA receptor hypofunction that occurs as the brain ages may be partially responsible for memory deficits associated with aging. Schizophrenia may also have to do with irregular NMDA receptor function (the glutamate hypothesis of schizophrenia). Increased levels of another NMDA antagonist, kynurenic acid, may aggravate the symptoms of schizophrenia, according to the "kynurenic hypothesis". NMDA receptor antagonists can mimic these problems, sometimes inducing "psychotomimetic" side effects, i.e., symptoms resembling psychosis. Such side effects caused by NMDA receptor inhibitors include hallucinations, paranoid delusions, confusion, difficulty concentrating, agitation, alterations in mood, nightmares, catatonia, ataxia, anesthesia, and learning and memory deficits.

Because of these psychotomimetic effects, NMDA receptor antagonists, especially phencyclidine, ketamine, and dextromethorphan, are used as recreational drugs. At subanesthetic doses, these drugs have mild stimulant effects and, at higher doses, begin inducing dissociation and hallucinations, though these effects and the strength thereof vary from drug to drug.

Most NMDA receptor antagonists are metabolized in the liver. Frequent administration of most NMDA receptor antagonists can lead to tolerance, whereby the liver will more quickly eliminate NMDA receptor antagonists from the bloodstream.

NMDA receptor antagonists are also under investigation as antidepressants. Ketamine has been demonstrated to produce lasting antidepressant effects after administration in a clinical setting. In 2019, esketamine, an NMDA antagonizing enantiomer of ketamine, was approved for use as an antidepressant in the United States. In 2022, Auvelity was approved by the FDA for the treatment of depression. This combination medication contains dextromethorphan, an NMDA receptor antagonist.

== Neurotoxicity ==
Olney's lesions involve mass vacuolization of neurons observed in rodents. However, many suggest that this is not a valid model of human use, and studies conducted on primates have shown that use must be heavy and chronic to cause neurotoxicity. A 2009 review found no evidence of ketamine-induced neuron death in humans. However, temporary and permanent cognitive impairments have been shown to occur in long-term or heavy human users of the NMDA antagonists PCP and ketamine. A large-scale, longitudinal study found that current frequent ketamine users have modest cognitive deficits, while infrequent or former heavy users do not. Many drugs have been found that lessen the risk of neurotoxicity from NMDA receptor antagonists. Centrally acting alpha 2 agonists such as clonidine and guanfacine are thought to most directly target the etiology of NMDA neurotoxicity. Other drugs acting on various neurotransmitter systems known to inhibit NMDA antagonist neurotoxicity include: anticholinergics, diazepam, barbiturates, ethanol, 5-HT_{2A} serotonin receptor agonists, anticonvulsants, and muscimol.

== Potential for treatment of excess excitotoxicity ==
Since NMDA receptor overactivation is implicated in excitotoxicity, NMDA receptor antagonists have held much promise for the treatment of conditions that involve excitotoxicity, including benzodiazepine withdrawal, traumatic brain injury, stroke, and neurodegenerative diseases such as Alzheimer's, Parkinson's, and Huntington's. This is counterbalanced by the risk of developing Olney's lesions, and studies have started to find agents that prevent this neurotoxicity. Most clinical trials involving NMDA receptor antagonists have failed due to unwanted side effects of the drugs; since the receptors also play an important role in normal glutamatergic neurotransmission, blocking them causes side-effects. These results have not yet been reproduced in humans, however. Mild NMDA receptor antagonists like amitriptyline have been found to be helpful in benzodiazepine withdrawal.

== Mechanism of action ==
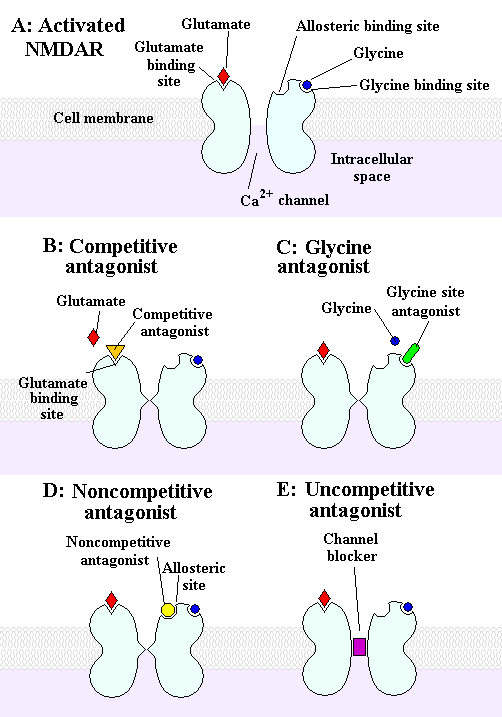
Simplified model of NMDAR activation and various types of NMDAR blockers

The NMDA receptor is an ionotropic receptor that allows for the transfer of electrical signals between neurons in the brain and in the spinal column. For electrical signals to pass, the NMDA receptor must be open. To remain open, glutamate and glycine must bind to the NMDA receptor. An NMDA receptor that has glycine and glutamate bound to it and has an open ion channel is called "activated".

Chemicals that deactivate the NMDA receptor are called antagonists. NMDAR antagonists fall into four categories: Competitive antagonists block binding to neurotransmitter glutamate sites; glycine antagonists block binding to glycine sites; noncompetitive antagonists inhibit binding to NMDARs allosteric sites; and uncompetitive antagonists block binding to a site within the ion channel.

== Examples ==
=== Competitive antagonists ===
- AP5 (APV, R-2-amino-5-phosphonopentanoate).
- AP7 (2-amino-7-phosphonoheptanoic acid).
- CGP-37849
- CPPene (3-[(R)-2-carboxypiperazin-4-yl]-prop-2-enyl-1-phosphonic acid).
- Selfotel: an anxiolytic, anticonvulsant but with possible neurotoxic effects.

=== Uncompetitive channel blockers ===
- 3-MeO-PCP: an analogue of PCP
- 8A-PDHQ: a high affinity PCP structural analogue.
- Amantadine: used for treating Parkinson's disease, influenza, and Alzheimer's disease.
- AZD6765.
- Agmatine: Blocks NMDA receptors and other cation ligand-gated channels. Can also potentiate opioid analgesia.
- Argiotoxin: polyamine toxins produced by the orb-weaver spider (Araneus gemma and Argiope lobata)
- Chloroform: an early anesthetic.
- Cyclopropane: an early anesthetic.
- Delucemine: also an SSRI with neuroprotective properties.
- Desflurane: an inhalational anesthetic.
- Dextrallorphan: a more potent analogue of dextromethorphan.
- Dextromethorphan: an antitussive found in OTC cough medicines.
- Dextrorphan: active metabolite of dextromethorphan.
- Dextromethadone: (S)-enantiomer of the drug methadone that has low affinity for opioid receptors and exhibits rapid antidepressant effects in animal models.
- Diphenidine: a designer drug and PCP analogue sold on the internet.
- Dizocilpine (MK-801): an experimental drug used in scientific research.
- Ethanol: also known as alcohol, a widely used intoxicant.
- Eticyclidine: a slightly more potent dissociative anesthetic than phencyclidine but with greater nausea/unpleasant taste, that was discontinued early in its development due to these digestive complaints.
- F-17475: an analgesic with ketamine-like discriminative stimulus effects in rodents
- Gacyclidine: an experimental drug developed for neuroprotection and is being studied for the treatment of tinnitus.
- Halothane: an inhalational anesthetic.
- Isoflurane: an inhalational anesthetic.
- Ketamine: a dissociative hallucinogen with antidepressant properties used as an anesthetic in humans and animals, a possible treatment in bipolar disorder patients with treatment-resistant depression, and used recreationally for its effects on the CNS.
- Magnesium.
- Memantine: treatment for Alzheimer's disease.
- Methoxetamine: a novel designer drug sold on the internet.
- Methoxydine: 4-MeO-PCP.
- Minocycline.
- Neramexane: a memantine analogue with nootropic, antidepressant properties. Also a nicotinic acetylcholine antagonist.
- Nitromemantine: a novel memantine derivative.
- Nitrous oxide: used for anesthesia, particularly in dentistry.
- PD-137889: Potent NMDA receptor antagonist with roughly 30 times the potency of ketamine. Substitutes for PCP in animal studies.
- Phencyclidine: a dissociative anesthetic previously used in medicine, but its development was discontinued in the 1960s in favor of its successor ketamine due to its relatively high incidence of psychotomimetic effects. Abused recreational and legally controlled in most countries.
- Remacemide: a low affinity antagonist also a sodium-channel blocker.
- Rolicyclidine: a less potent analogue of phencyclidine, but seems to be seldom, if ever, abused.
- Sevoflurane: an inhalational anesthetic.
- Tenocyclidine: an analogue of phencyclidine that is more potent.
- Tiletamine: an animal anesthetic.
- Eliprodil: an anticonvulsant drug with neuroprotective properties.
- Etoxadrol: a potent dissociative similar to PCP.
- Dexoxadrol: similar to etoxadrol.
- WMS-2539: potent fluorinated derivative of dexoxadrol.
- NEFA: a moderate affinity antagonist.

=== Non-competitive antagonists ===
- Aptiganel (Cerestat, CNS-1102): binds the Mg^{2+} binding site within the channel of the NMDA receptor.
- Atomoxetine: a norepinephrine reuptake inhibitor used in the treatment of ADHD.
- HU-211: an enantiomer of the potent cannabinoid HU-210 which lacks cannabinoid effects and instead acts as a potent non-competitive NMDA antagonist.
- Huperzine A.
- Dipeptide D-Phe-L-Tyr. weakly inhibit NMDA/Gly-induced currents possibly by ifenprodil-like mechanism.
- Ibogaine: a naturally occurring alkaloid found in plants of the family Apocynaceae. Has been used, albeit with limited evidence, to treat opioid and other addictions.
- Remacemide: principle metabolite is an uncompetitive antagonist with a low affinity for the binding site.
- Rhynchophylline an alkaloid, found in Kratom and Rubiaceae.
- Gabapentin: a calcium α_{2}δ ligand that is commonly used in diabetic neuropathy.

=== Glycine antagonists ===
These drugs act at the glycine binding site:

- Rapastinel (GLYX-13) (weak partial agonist; IA = ~20%).
- NRX-1074 (weak partial agonist).
- 7-Chlorokynurenic acid.
- 4-Chlorokynurenine (AV-101) (prodrug for 7-chlorokynurenic acid).
- 5,7-Dichlorokynurenic acid.
- Kynurenic acid (a naturally occurring antagonist).
- TK-40 (competitive antagonist at the GluN1 glycine binding site).
- 1-Aminocyclopropanecarboxylic acid (ACPC).
- L-Phenylalanine. a naturally occurring amino acid (equilibrium dissociation constant (K_{B}) from Schild regression is 573 μM).
- Xenon: an anesthetic.

== Potencies ==
=== Selected uncompetitive channel blockers ===
Against rat NMDAR
Compound	IC_{50} (nM)	K_{i} (nM)
(+)-MK-801	4.1	2.5
2-Cl-Diphenidine	14.6	9.3
Diphenidine	28.6	18.2
2-MeO-Diphenidine	56.5	36.0
Phencyclidine	91	57.9
Ketamine	508.5	323.9
Paracetamol	59421	37841

== See also ==
- List of investigational antidepressants
- Discovery and development of memantine and related compounds
