= List of German drug laws =

In Germany, several laws govern drugs (both recreational and pharmaceutical).

== Narcotic Drugs Act ==
The Narcotic Drugs Act (Betäubungsmittelgesetz, BtMG) regulates narcotics and contains explicit lists of those covered: Anlage I (authorized scientific use only), Anlage II (authorized trade only, not prescriptible) and Anlage III (special prescription form required). The lists contain some exceptions for lower doses.

== Betäubungsmittel-Verschreibungsverordnung (BTMVV) ==
Betäubungsmittel-Verschreibungsverordnung (BTMVV) regulates the prescription of Anlage III narcotics on the special prescription form

== Arzneimittelgesetz ==
Arzneimittelgesetz (AMG) covers prescription drugs, pharmacy-only and general sales list drugs.

Verordnung über die Verschreibungspflicht von Arzneimitteln, also known as Arzneimittelverschreibungsverordnung (AMVV), is an executive order that explicitly lists prescription drugs. It contains a blanket inclusion for all exceptions from Anlage I, II and III BtMG; thus, a normal prescription is still required for such preparations.

Verordnung über apothekenpflichtige und freiverkäufliche Arzneimittel, also known as Arzneimittelverkehrs-Rechtsverordnung (AMVerkRV), is an executive order that explicitly lists pharmacy-only and general sales list drugs.

== Medizinproduktegesetz (MPG) ==
Medizinprodukte-Abgabeverordnung (MPAV), covers some substances with medical effects that are not drugs, like disinfectants for medical apparatuses

== Neue-psychoaktive-Stoffe-Gesetz (NpSG) ==
NpSG governs chemical groups of research chemicals, allowing to cover multiple variants. Use of covered substances is permitted only for industrial and scientific purposes.

== Grundstoffüberwachungsgesetz (GÜG) ==
GÜG covers raw materials that can be used for synthesizing drugs. These are categorized into Kategorie 1 (authorization required), Kategorie 2 (reporting required) and Kategorie 3 (export restrictions)

== See also ==
- Cannabis Act (Germany)
