= Dissociative =

Class of psychoactive drugs

- Drug class
- Chemical structure of ketamine, one of the most well-known dissociatives.

Class identifiers
- Use: Recreational, spiritual, medical
- Mechanism of action: NMDA receptor antagonism (most dissociatives)
- Biological target: NMDA receptor (most dissociatives)
- Chemical class: Adamantanes, arylcyclohexylamines, diarylethylamines, morphinans, simple inhalants, others

Legal status
- Legal status: Variable

Dissociatives are a subclass of hallucinogens that distort perception of sight and sound and produce feelings of detachment – dissociation – from the environment and/or self. Although many kinds of drugs are capable of such an effect, dissociatives are unique in that they do so in such a way that they produce hallucinogenic effects, which may include dissociation, a general decrease in sensory experience, hallucinations, dream-like states or anesthesia.

Despite most dissociatives' main mechanism of action being tied to NMDA receptor antagonism, some of these substances, which are nonselective in action and affect the dopamine and/or opioid systems, may be capable of inducing more direct and repeatable euphoria or symptoms which are more akin to the effects of typical "hard drugs" or common drugs of abuse. This is likely why dissociatives are considered to be addictive with a fair to moderate potential for abuse, unlike psychedelics. Despite some dissociatives, such as phencyclidine (PCP) possessing stimulating properties, most dissociatives seem to have a general depressant effect and can produce sedation, respiratory depression, nausea, disorientation, analgesia, anesthesia, ataxia, cognitive and memory impairment as well as amnesia.

Examples of dissociatives include arylcyclohexylamines like ketamine and phencyclidine (PCP); morphinans like dextromethorphan (DXM); inhalants like nitrous oxide (N_{2}O); diarylethylamines like diphenidine and N-ethyl-lanicemine; and adamantanes like memantine, among others.

== Effects ==
The effects of dissociatives can include sensory dissociation, hallucinations, mania, catalepsy, analgesia and amnesia. According to Pender (1972), "the state has been designated as dissociative anesthesia since the patient truly seems disassociated from his environment." Both Pender (1970) and Johnstone et al. (1959) reported that patients under anaesthesia due to either ketamine or phencyclidine were prone to purposeless movements and had hallucinations (or "dreams") during and after anaesthesia. Some patients found the hallucinations euphoric while others found them disturbing.

At sub-anesthetic doses, dissociatives alter many of the same cognitive and perceptual processes affected by other hallucinogenic drugs such as mescaline, LSD, and psilocybin; hence they are often contrasted and also considered hallucinogenic. Perhaps the most significant subjective differences between dissociatives and the classical hallucinogens (such as LSD and mescaline) are the detaching effects, including: depersonalization, the feeling of being unreal, disconnected from one's self, or unable to control one's actions; and derealization, the feeling that the outside world is unreal or that one is dreaming.

== Use ==
=== Medical use ===
Many dissociatives such as ketamine are used as anesthetics for surgery or pain relief in medical contexts such as in hospitals. However, due to possible psychotomimetic reactions they are sometimes used reluctantly. Certain morphinan dissociatives such as dextromethorphan are also used in sub-psychoactive dosages to suppress coughing. In 2022, the FDA approved the combination medication Dextromethorphan/bupropion for treatment of major depressive disorder and agitation associated with dementia caused by Alzheimer's disease.

Ketamine is also currently being studied and is showing promising results as a possible fast-acting antidepressant. It may also function as a possible palliative treatment for C-PTSD and chronic pain.

=== Recreational use ===
Some dissociative drugs are used recreationally. Ketamine and nitrous oxide are club drugs. Phencyclidine (PCP or angel dust) is available as a street drug. Dextromethorphan-based cough syrups (often labeled DXM) are taken by some users in higher than medically recommended levels for their dissociative effects. Historically, chloroform and diethyl ether have been used recreationally.

== See also ==
- Arylcyclohexylamine
- List of hallucinogens
- List of investigational hallucinogens and entactogens
- Morphinan
- NMDA receptor antagonist
- Recreational use of nitrous oxide
- Hallucinogen
- Deliriant
- Dissociation (neuropsychology)
- Dissociation (psychology)
- Trip report
