= Diphenylacetonitrile =

Organic chemical

Names
- Other names 2,2-Diphenylacetonitrile, Dipan, Diphenatrile, Benzhydrylcyanide.

Identifiers
CAS Number	86-29-3
3D model (JSmol)	Interactive image
ChEMBL	ChEMBL3185477
ChemSpider	6576
ECHA InfoCard	100.001.511
EC Number	201-662-5
PubChem CID	6837
UNII	QK4W106TKU
CompTox Dashboard (EPA)	DTXSID4020539
- InChI: InChI=1S/C14H11N/c15-11-14(12-7-3-1-4-8-12)13-9-5-2-6-10-13/h1-10,14H Key: NEBPTMCRLHKPOB-UHFFFAOYSA-N
- SMILES: C1=CC=C(C=C1)C(C#N)C2=CC=CC=C2

Properties
Chemical formula	C_{14}H_{11}N
Molar mass	193.24 g/mol
Density	1.1061g/cm^{3} (estimated)
Melting point	71–73 °C (160–163 °F; 344–346 K)
Boiling point	181 °C (358 °F; 454 K) @ 12 mmHg

Hazards
- GHS labelling
Pictograms	(GHS06: Toxic) (GHS07: Exclamation mark)
Signal word	Danger
Hazard statements	H301, H315, H319, H335
Precautionary statements	P261, P264, P264+P265, P270, P271, P280, P301+P316, P302+P352, P304+P340, P305+P351+P338, P319, P321, P330, P332+P317, P337+P317, P362+P364, P403+P233, P405, P501
- Except where otherwise noted, data are given for materials in their standard state (at 25 °C [77 °F], 100 kPa). Infobox references

Diphenylacetonitrile is an organic compound with the formula (C_{6}H_{5})_{2}CHCN. A colorless solid, it is widely used in the pharmaceutical industry.

== Synthesis ==
In Hoch's original procedure, phenylacetonitrile was halogenated with molecular bromine to give bromobenzyl cyanide (BBC). This species was then reacted with benzene in the presence of aluminium trichloride to afford diphenylacetonitrile. This procedure has been optimized over the years.

An alternative route involves the reaction of bromodiphenylmethane with sodium cyanide under phase transfer conditions:

(C_{6}H_{5})_{2}CHBr + NaCN → (C_{6}H_{5})_{2}CHCN + NaBr

== Applications ==
- Opioid analgesics: Bezitramide, Dipipanone, Dipyanone, Isomethadol, LAAM, Methadone, Noracymethadol, Normethadone, Norpipanone, Piritramide, R-4066, R 4837 [59708-47-3], R-5260 [1109-69-9] (25ii):
- Psychostimulants: 2-Benzhydrylpiperazine [28217-87-0], Desoxypipradrol, DPA-1 [3139-55-7], β-Phenylmethamphetamine, Desoxyhexapradol.
- Antidepressants: McN-4187, McN 4612-z (Parent compound to JNJ-7925476, McN 5707 & McN5652, etc. SAR with tametraline) & deschloro-clemeprol (although the literature procedure for 1,1-diphenylacetone is different to this).
- Antipsychotics: McN-4171 This agent is an analog of butaclamol. McN-4612-Y is also described in the attached article. This is similar to McN 4612-z, which was described above except it is the opposite optical antipode. It is also possible to make PC12515636 from the primary amine using a double Michael reaction followed by Dieckman condensation, which is the standard method of 4-piperidone synthesis.
- Antispasmodics: Aminopentamide, Buzepide, Fenpiverinium, Fenpipramide
  - Urinary incontinence: Darifenacin, Imidafenacin
- Anti-diarrhoeals: Difenoxin, Diphenoxylate, Nufenoxole
- Choleretic and spasmolytic agent: Diisopromine
- Analeptic (respiratory stimulant): Doxapram
- Antiarrhythmic: Isopropanamide
- Cytochromes P450 inhibitor: Proadifen
- 2,2-DEP [36794-51-1] (Hamilton Morris's diphenidine positional isomer drug).

== See also ==
- Hoch also discovered the Hoch-Campbell ethylenimine synthesis.
- Diphenylacetic acid
