= C13H16FNO =

The molecular formula C_{13}H_{16}FNO (molar mass: 221.28 g/mol) may refer to:

- Fluorodeschloroketamine
  - 2-Fluorodeschloroketamine
  - 3-Fluorodeschloroketamine
  - Blixeprodil (4-Fluorodeschloroketamine)
