= C19H24N2O =

The molecular formula C_{19}H_{24}N_{2}O (molar mass: 296.41 g/mol) may refer to:

- Aminopentamide
- Eburnamine
- Heyneanine
- Noribogaine
- Imipraminoxide
- Palonosetron
- RTI-171
- Vincanol
