= Bromocyclohexane =

Names
- Preferred IUPAC name Bromocyclohexane
- Other names Cyclohexyl bromide

Identifiers
CAS Number	108-85-0
3D model (JSmol)	Interactive image
Abbreviations	CyBr
ChemSpider	7672
ECHA InfoCard	100.003.294
PubChem CID	7960
UNII	YA0UMS4RNY
CompTox Dashboard (EPA)	DTXSID1044148
- InChI: InChI=1S/C6H11Br/c7-6-4-2-1-3-5-6/h6H,1-5H2 Key: AQNQQHJNRPDOQV-UHFFFAOYSA-N; InChI=1/C6H11Br/c7-6-4-2-1-3-5-6/h6H,1-5H2 Key: AQNQQHJNRPDOQV-UHFFFAOYAD
- SMILES: BrC1CCCCC1

Properties
Chemical formula	C_{6}H_{11}Br
Molar mass	163.058 g·mol^{−1}
Appearance	colorless liquid
Density	1.324 g/cm^{3}
Melting point	−57 °C (−71 °F; 216 K)
Boiling point	166 to 167 °C (331 to 333 °F; 439 to 440 K)

Hazards
- GHS labelling
Pictograms	(GHS07: Exclamation mark) (GHS09: Environmental hazard)
Signal word	Warning
Hazard statements	H227, H315, H319, H335, H411
Precautionary statements	P210, P261, P264, P264+P265, P271, P273, P280, P302+P352, P304+P340, P305+P351+P338, P319, P321, P332+P317, P337+P317, P362+P364, P370+P378, P391, P403, P403+P233, P405, P501
Flash point	62.8 °C (145.0 °F; 335.9 K)

Related compounds
Related compounds	Chlorocyclohexane; Fluorocyclohexane; Iodocyclohexane; Bromocyclopropane; Bromocyclobutane; Bromocyclopentane
- Except where otherwise noted, data are given for materials in their standard state (at 25 °C [77 °F], 100 kPa). verify (what is ?) Infobox references

Bromocyclohexane (also called cyclohexyl bromide, abbreviated CXB) is an organic compound with the chemical formula (CH_{2})_{5}CHBr.

== Uses and reactions ==
It is used to match the refractive index of PMMA for example in confocal microscopy of colloids. A mixture of cis-decalin and CXB can simultaneously match optical index and density of PMMA. Due to the moderate dielectric constant of CXB (ε = 7.9), PMMA acquires charges that can be screened by the addition of salt (e.g. tetrabutyl ammonium bromide), leading to a very good approximation of colloidal hard sphere. A drawback is that CXB is a good solvent for PMMA, causing it to swell over time, which may lead to a poor determination of particle radii and determination of solid volume fraction.

It is a standard coupling partner of cross coupling reactions. Similarly, cyclohexyl bromide is a standard alkylating agent.

Stated applications in drug chemistry include the synthesis of gamfexine, drofenine, trihexyphenidyl, procyclidine, feclemine, hexocyclium, hexasonium, amedin & oxyphenonium respectively.

== Synthesis ==
Bromocyclohexane can be prepared by the free radical bromination of cyclohexane.

== Safety ==
Bromocyclohexane is an alkylating agent.
