= C17H20ClNO =

The molecular formula C_{17}H_{20}ClNO may refer to:

- A-NK
- Chlodantane
- Clemeprol
- Clofedanol
