= Gamfexine =

Chemical compound

Clinical data
- Routes of administration: Oral
- ATC code: none

Legal status
- Legal status: In general: unscheduled

Identifiers
- IUPAC name: 1-phenyl-1-cyclohexyl-3-dimethylaminopropane
- CAS Number: 7273-99-6
- PubChem CID: 31041
- ChemSpider: 28799
- UNII: 3U2V80KPAL
- KEGG: D04298
- CompTox Dashboard (EPA): DTXSID50864033

Chemical and physical data
- Formula: C_{17}H_{27}N
- Molar mass: 245.410 g·mol^{−1}
- 3D model (JSmol): Interactive image
- SMILES: c1ccccc1C(CCN(C)C)C2CCCCC2
- InChI: InChI=1S/C17H27N/c1-18(2)14-13-17(15-9-5-3-6-10-15)16-11-7-4-8-12-16/h3,5-6,9-10,16-17H,4,7-8,11-14H2,1-2H3; Key:AJDSHXKJJDQZCJ-UHFFFAOYSA-N

Gamfexine (WIN-1,344) is a centrally acting stimulant drug, which was tested as an adjunct treatment for withdrawn patients with schizophrenia, but while effective for treating withdrawal it made psychotic symptoms worse.

It was stated that gamfexine was the progenitor in the discovery of venlafaxine. This could be the reason why both agents share the same suffix.

== Synthesis ==
The precursor chemical is made from benzyl cyanide and bromocyclohexane. This compound serves dual use in the synthesis of drofenine, hexasonium & feclemine & MR-16728.

The synthesis of gamfexine has been discussed: Patents: The method discussed by Lednicer & Mitscher is slightly different from the patented procedure and uses 2-Cyclohexylidene-2-phenylacetonitrile [10461-98-0]. This chemical is an odoriferous substance. It is known to have been used in the synthesis of Fenclexonium.

Alkylation of cyclohexylphenylacetonitrile [3893-23-0] (1) with 2-chloroethyldimethylamine (2), using NaNH2 as base, gives nitrile, PC412902 (3). Removal of the nitrile group apparently occurred upon reaction with more NaNH2. This completed the synthesis of Gamfexine (4).

N.B. Note that the removal of cyanide also occurs in one of the syntheses of chlorpheniramine. Here though, sulfuric acid was used as the reagent for this step.

An alternative synthesis strategy is envisioned to consist of Mannich reaction & organometallic addition to the carbonyl group (c.f. trihexyphenidyl), followed by reductive removal of the tertiary hydroxyl group; or by starting form Benzoylcyclohexane [712-50-5].

== See also ==
- Delucemine
- 3,3-Diphenyl-N-dimethylpropylamine [4646-55-3] is reported to have antidepressant properties. It is made from diphenylmethane.
