= C18H23N3O =

The molecular formula C_{18}H_{23}N_{3}O (molar mass: 297.40 g/mol) may refer to:

- Acetergamine
- Vamicamide
