= DXE (disambiguation) =

DXE may refer to:

- Deschloroketamine, a dissociative anesthetic
- Direct Action Everywhere, an animal rights group
- Bruce Campbell Field, the IATA code DXE
- Driver Execution Environment, a boot stage of UEFI
- DXE class, a New Zealand DX class
