= Propiophenone =

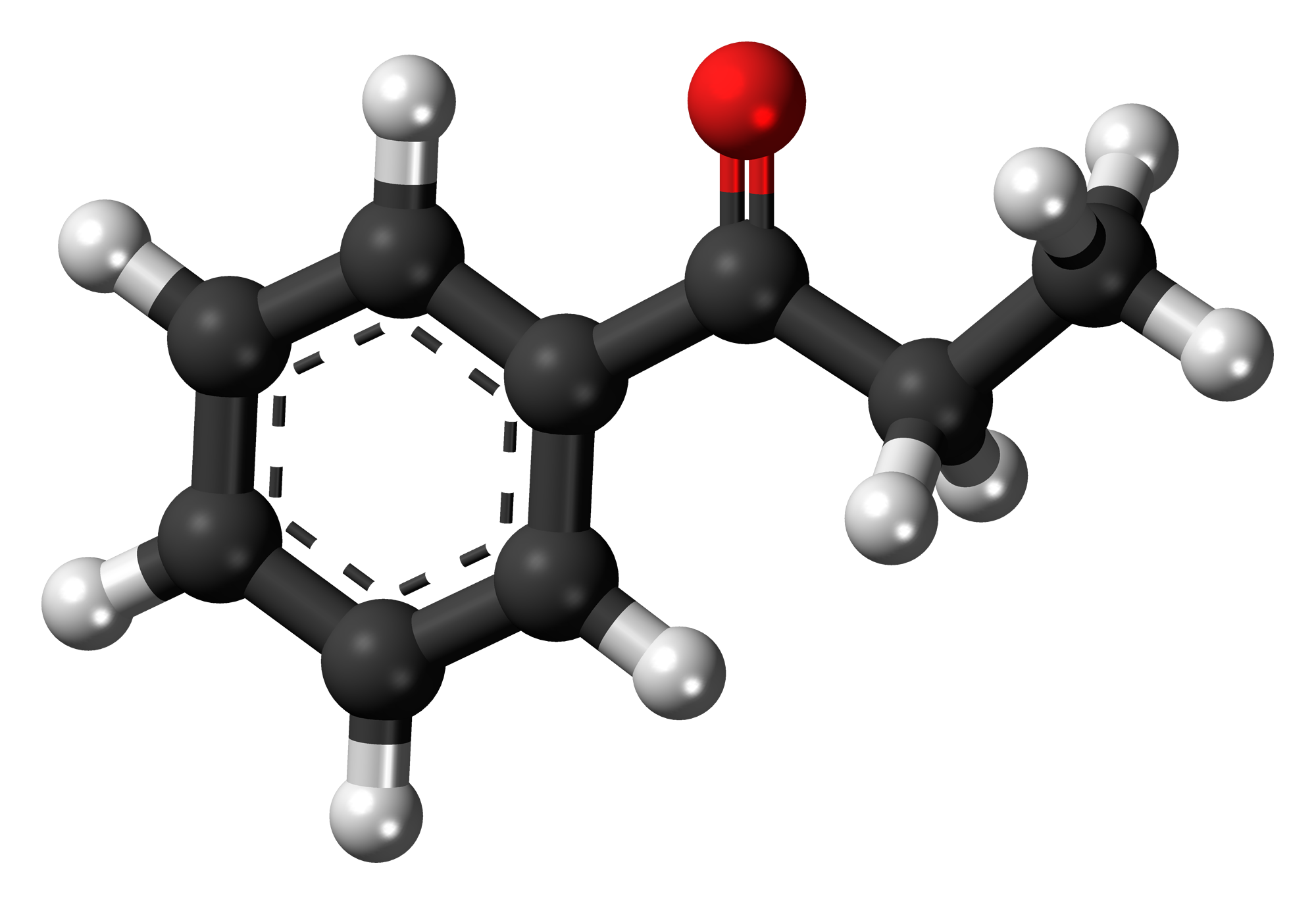

Names
- Preferred IUPAC name 1-Phenylpropan-1-one
- Other names Ethyl phenyl ketone, BzEt, EPhK

Identifiers
CAS Number	93-55-0
3D model (JSmol)	Interactive image
ChEBI	CHEBI:425902
ChEMBL	ChEMBL193446
ChemSpider	6881
ECHA InfoCard	100.002.053
PubChem CID	7148
UNII	E599A8OKQH
CompTox Dashboard (EPA)	DTXSID2044470
- InChI: InChI=1S/C9H10O/c1-2-9(10)8-6-4-3-5-7-8/h3-7H,2H2,1H3 Key: KRIOVPPHQSLHCZ-UHFFFAOYSA-N; InChI=1/C9H10O/c1-2-9(10)8-6-4-3-5-7-8/h3-7H,2H2,1H3 Key: KRIOVPPHQSLHCZ-UHFFFAOYAT
- SMILES: CCC(=O)c1ccccc1

Properties
Chemical formula	C_{9}H_{10}O
Molar mass	134.178 g·mol^{−1}
Appearance	Colorless liquid
Density	1.0087 g/mL
Melting point	18.6 °C (65.5 °F; 291.8 K)
Boiling point	218 °C (424 °F; 491 K)
Solubility in water	Insoluble
Magnetic susceptibility (χ)	−83.73·10^{−6} cm^{3}/mol

Related compounds
Related ketones	Acetophenone; Butyrophenone
- Except where otherwise noted, data are given for materials in their standard state (at 25 °C [77 °F], 100 kPa). verify (what is ?) Infobox references

Propiophenone (shorthand: benzoylethane or BzEt) is an aryl ketone. It is a colorless, sweet-smelling liquid that is insoluble in water, but miscible with organic solvents. It is used in the preparation of other compounds.

== Production ==
Propiophenone can be prepared by Friedel–Crafts reaction of propanoyl chloride and benzene. It is also prepared commercially by ketonization of benzoic acid and propionic acid over calcium acetate and alumina at 450–550 °C:

C_{6}H_{5}CO_{2}H + CH_{3}CH_{2}CO_{2}H → C_{6}H_{5}C(O)CH_{2}CH_{3} + CO_{2} + H_{2}O

Ludwig Claisen discovered that α-methoxystyrene forms this compound when heated for an hour at 300 °C (65% yield).

== Uses ==
Phenmetrazine, derived from propiophenone, is an appetite suppressant.

It is an intermediate in the synthesis of the pharmaceuticals phenmetrazine and propoxyphen.

Other drugs made from propiophenone include the following: PDM-35, Eprazinone, Methcathinone (leading to ephedrine), Trimebutine, Amfepramone, Diphepanol, Metamfepramone, Etoxadrol, Hydroxyphenamate, Phendimetrazine, Iminophenimide, Bencisteine, Flumecinol, Pyrroliphene, Perisone,

In the Hoch-Campbell ethylenimine synthesis, a compound called 3-Methyl-2,2-diphenylaziridine [7764-13-8] was made.
