= 2-Bromodeschloroketamine =

Chemical compound

Legal status
- Legal status: CA: Schedule I; DE: NpSG (Industrial and scientific use only); UK: Class B

Identifiers
- IUPAC name: 2-(2-Bromophenyl)-2-(methylamino)cyclohexan-1-one
- CAS Number: 120807-70-7
- PubChem CID: 71588007
- ChemSpider: 62958449
- UNII: BG9ADQ6XT9
- CompTox Dashboard (EPA): DTXSID201336501

Chemical and physical data
- Formula: C_{13}H_{16}BrNO
- Molar mass: 282.181 g·mol^{−1}
- 3D model (JSmol): Interactive image
- SMILES: CNC1(CCCCC1=O)C2=CC=CC=C2Br
- InChI: InChI=1S/C13H16BrNO/c1-15-13(9-5-4-8-12(13)16)10-6-2-3-7-11(10)14/h2-3,6-7,15H,4-5,8-9H2,1H3; Key:XPMMBFIMXKSQIQ-UHFFFAOYSA-N

2-Bromodeschloroketamine (also known as 2-Br-2'-Oxo-PCM and bromoketamine) is a chemical compound of the arylcyclohexylamine class, which is an analog of the dissociative anesthetic drug ketamine in which the chlorine atom has been replaced with a bromine atom. Its specific pharmacological activities have not been studied. It is used in scientific research as a comparison or control compound in studies into the metabolism of ketamine and norketamine. It has been sold online as a designer drug.

== See also ==
- 2-Fluorodeschloroketamine
- 3-Fluorodeschloroketamine
- Deschloroketamine
- Methoxyketamine
- Trifluoromethyldeschloroketamine
