= C20H25NO =

The molecular formula C_{20}H_{25}NO may refer to:

- Difemetorex, or diphemethoxidine
- Diphepanol
- Glemanserin
- Methoxphenidine
- Normethadone
- Pridinol
- Talopram
