= 2-FXPr =

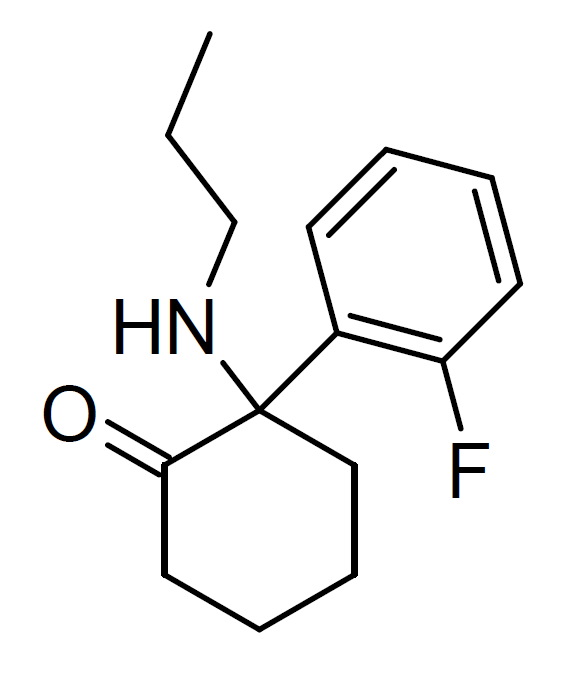

Identifiers
- IUPAC name: 2-(propylamino)-2-(2-fluorophenyl)cyclohexan-1-one

Chemical and physical data
- Formula: C_{15}H_{20}FNO
- Molar mass: 249.329 g·mol^{−1}
- 3D model (JSmol): Interactive image
- SMILES: CCCNC2(c1ccccc1F)CCCCC2=O

2-FXPr (2'-fluoro-2-oxo-PCPr) is a designer drug from the arylcyclohexylamine family, which is believed to have dissociative effects. It has reportedly been sold over the internet since 2025. No pharmacological studies have yet been reported, but it is closely related to known compounds such as 2-Fluorodeschloroketamine and methoxpropamine.

== See also ==
- 2F-NENDCK
- 3-Fluorodeschloroketamine
- A-NK
- Fluorexetamine
- MXiPr
