= CYP305M2 =

Gene of the migratory locust involved in synthesizing phenylacetonitrile

Identifiers
- Organism: Locusta migratoria
- Symbol: CYP305M2
- Orthologs: OMA: entry
- UniProt: A0A410UD22

Other data
- EC number: 1.14.-.-
Search for
- Structures: Swiss-model
- Domains: InterPro

CYP305M2 (formerly called LM16181) is a cytochrome P450 enzyme found in migratory locust (Locusta migratoria) that catalyzes the key step of biosynthesis of phenylacetonitrile (PAN). PAN in turn is used as an aposematic chemical defense against predators.

Biosynthesis of phenylacetonitrile catalyzed by CYP305M2 and subsequent decomposition to benzaldehyde and cyanide
