= Diphenylacetic acid =

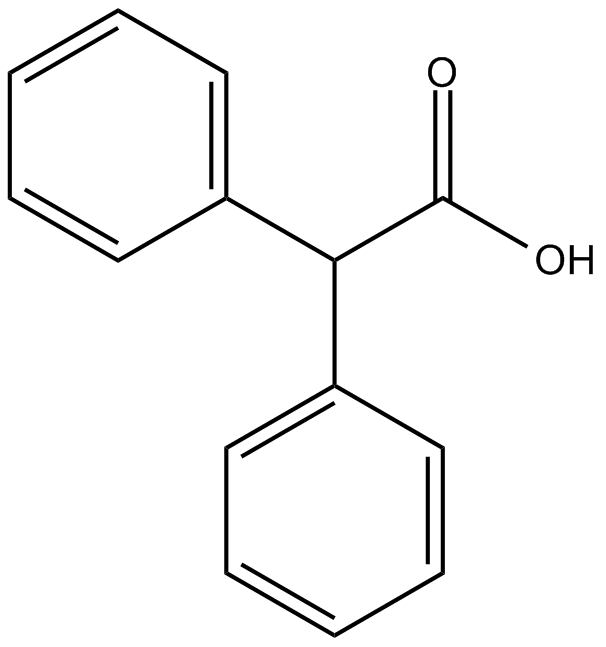

Names
- Other names 2,2-diphenylacetic acid

Identifiers
CAS Number	117-34-0
3D model (JSmol)	Interactive image
ChEBI	CHEBI:41967
ChEMBL	ChEMBL1232181
ChemSpider	8030
DrugBank	DB03588
ECHA InfoCard	100.003.805
EC Number	204-185-0
PubChem CID	8333
UNII	658NCZ0NKO
CompTox Dashboard (EPA)	DTXSID0059453
- InChI: InChI=1S/C14H12O2/c15-14(16)13(11-7-3-1-4-8-11)12-9-5-2-6-10-12/h1-10,13H,(H,15,16) Key: PYHXGXCGESYPCW-UHFFFAOYSA-N
- SMILES: C1=CC=C(C=C1)C(C2=CC=CC=C2)C(=O)O

Properties
Chemical formula	C_{14}H_{12}O_{2}
Molar mass	212.24 g/mol
Density	g/cm^{3}
Melting point	147–149 °C (297–300 °F; 420–422 K)

Hazards
- GHS labelling
Pictograms	(GHS06: Toxic) (GHS07: Exclamation mark) (GHS09: Environmental hazard)
Signal word	Danger
Hazard statements	H302, H311, H315, H319, H331, H332, H335, H400
Precautionary statements	P261, P262, P264, P264+P265, P270, P271, P273, P280, P301+P317, P302+P352, P304+P340, P305+P351+P338, P316, P317, P319, P321, P330, P332+P317, P337+P317, P361+P364, P362+P364, P391, P403+P233, P405, P501
- Except where otherwise noted, data are given for materials in their standard state (at 25 °C [77 °F], 100 kPa). Infobox references

Diphenylacetic acid is an organic chemical with applications in drug synthesis.

== Applications ==
1. AB06-117 (cmp #23)
2. Adiphenine
3. Arpenal
4. Asimadoline
5. 2,2-DEP [36794-51-1]
6. Desmethylmoramide
7. Diphenamide [957-51-7] Herbicide
8. Dioxaphetyl butyrate
9. Fluperamide
10. Loperamide
11. PD-85639
12. Moramide
13. Pifenate
14. Tropacine
15. BIBO-3304 [191868-13-0]
16. BIBP-3226
17. PC4225440
18. 4-Tert-butyl-1-(2,2-diphenylethyl)-4-piperidinol (Butaclamol analog)

== Synthesis ==
- From hydroiodic acid reduction of benzilic acid.
- Alternative procedure:
- From chloral and benzene:
- From glyoxylic acid and benzene:

== See also ==
- Diphenylacetonitrile
