= IC 26 =

IC 26 may refer to:

- IC-26, an analogue of the opioid analgesic methadone
- NGC 135, a more common name for the lenticular galaxy IC 26
