= Benzyl cyanide =

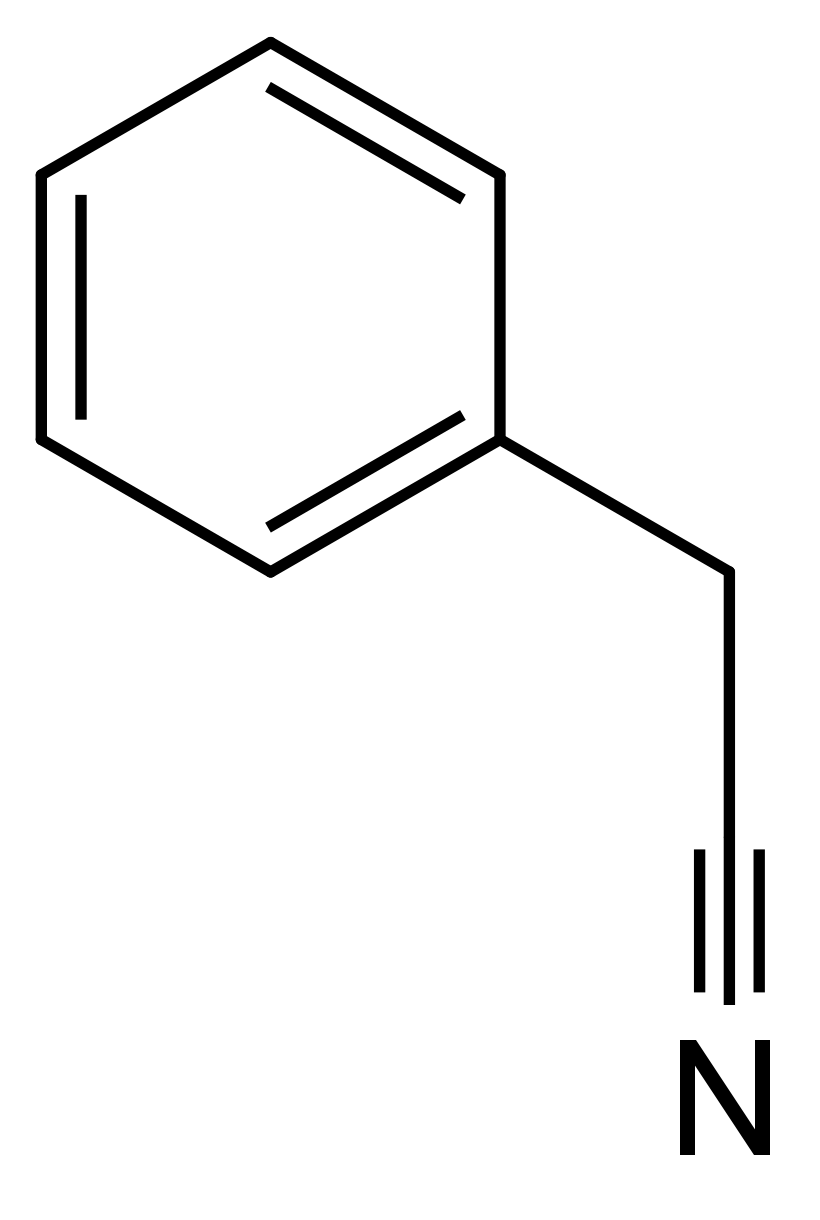

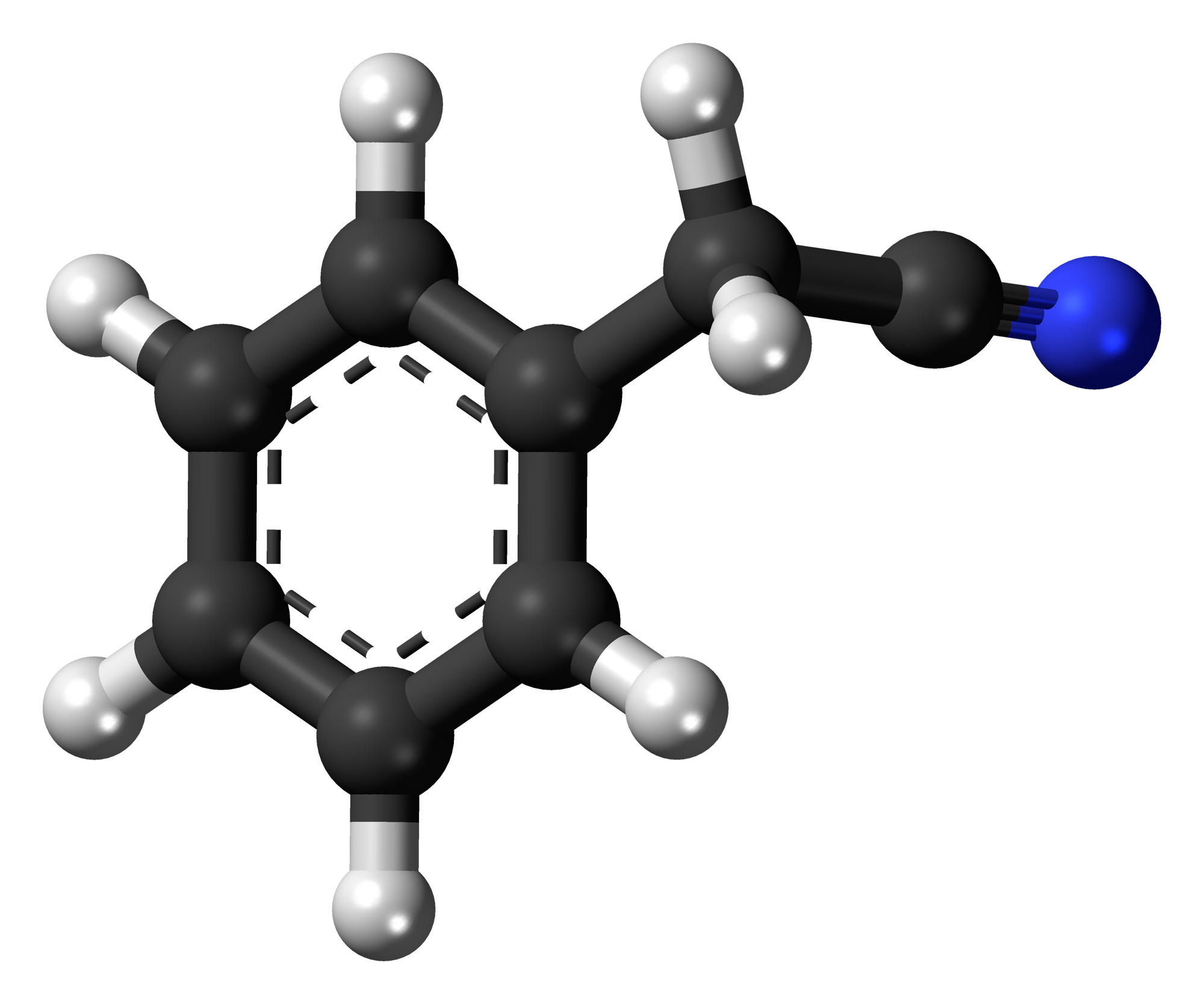

Names
- Preferred IUPAC name Phenylacetonitrile
- Other names: Benzyl cyanide; 2-Phenylacetonitrile; α-Tolunitrile; Benzylnitrile

Identifiers
CAS Number	140-29-4
3D model (JSmol)	Interactive image
Abbreviations	BnCN; PhCH_{2}CN
ChEBI	CHEBI:25979
ChemSpider	13839308
ECHA InfoCard	100.004.919
KEGG	C16074
PubChem CID	8794
UNII	23G40PRP93
CompTox Dashboard (EPA)	DTXSID2021492
- InChI: InChI=1S/C8H7N/c9-7-6-8-4-2-1-3-5-8/h1-5H,6H2 Key: SUSQOBVLVYHIEX-UHFFFAOYSA-N; InChI=1/C8H7N/c9-7-6-8-4-2-1-3-5-8/h1-5H,6H2 Key: SUSQOBVLVYHIEX-UHFFFAOYAJ
- SMILES: N#CCc1ccccc1

Properties
Chemical formula	C_{8}H_{7}N
Molar mass	117.151 g·mol^{−1}
Appearance	Colorless oily liquid
Density	1.015 g/cm^{3}
Melting point	−24 °C (−11 °F; 249 K)
Boiling point	233 to 234 °C (451 to 453 °F; 506 to 507 K)
Solubility in water	0.1 g/L (25 °C)
log P	1.56
Vapor pressure	1 mmHg (60 °C)
Magnetic susceptibility (χ)	−76.87·10^{−6} cm^{3}/mol
Refractive index (n_{D})	1.52105 (25 °C)

Hazards
- Occupational safety and health (OHS/OSH)
Main hazards	Poisonous. May be fatal if inhaled, swallowed, or absorbed through skin. Contact may cause burns to skin and eyes.
- GHS labelling
Pictograms	(GHS06: Toxic) (GHS07: Exclamation mark)
Signal word	Danger
Hazard statements	H301, H302, H311, H330
Precautionary statements	P260, P262, P264, P270, P271, P280, P284, P301+P316, P301+P317, P302+P352, P304+P340, P316, P320, P321, P330, P361+P364, P403+P233, P405, P501
NFPA 704 (fire diamond)	3 1 0
Flash point	102 °C (216 °F; 375 K)
- Lethal dose or concentration (LD, LC)
LD_{50} (median dose)	270 mg/kg (rat, oral)
LD_{Lo} (lowest published)	74.982 mg/kg (rat, intraperitoneal); 50 mg/kg (rabbit, subcutaneous); 120 mg/kg (pigeon, intramuscular)
LC_{50} (median concentration)	100 mg/m^{3} (mouse, 2h); 430 mg/m^{3} (rat, 2h)
- Except where otherwise noted, data are given for materials in their standard state (at 25 °C [77 °F], 100 kPa). verify (what is ?) Infobox references

Benzyl cyanide (abbreviated BnCN), also known as phenylacetonitrile, is an organic compound with the chemical formula C_{6}H_{5}CH_{2}CN. This colorless oily aromatic liquid is an important precursor to numerous compounds in organic chemistry. It is also an important pheromone in certain species.

== Preparation ==
Benzyl cyanide can be produced via Kolbe nitrile synthesis between benzyl chloride and sodium cyanide and by oxidative decarboxylation of phenylalanine.

Benzyl cyanides can also be prepared by arylation of silyl-substituted acetonitrile.

== Reactions ==
Benzyl cyanide undergoes many reactions characteristic of nitriles. It can be hydrolyzed to give phenylacetic acid or it can be used in the Pinner reaction to yield phenylacetic acid esters. Hydrogenation gives β-phenethylamine.

The compound contains an "active methylene unit". Bromination occurs gives PhCHBrCN. A variety of base-induced reactions result in the formation of new carbon-carbon bonds.

== Uses ==
Benzyl cyanide is used as a solvent and as a starting material in the synthesis of fungicides (e.g. Fenapanil), fragrances (phenethyl alcohol), antibiotics, and other pharmaceuticals. The partial hydrolysis of BnCN results in 2-phenylacetamide.

=== Pharmaceuticals ===
Benzyl cyanide is a useful precursor to numerous pharmaceuticals. Examples include:

- disopyramide), an antiarrhythmic
- milnacipran & lomevactone, antidepressants
- Antihistamines (e.g. levocabastine (para-fluoro), Pheniramine & Azatadine.
- Antitussives (e.g. isoaminile, oxeladin, fedrilate, pentoxyverine, etaminile, butethamate & pentapiperide)
- Diuretics (e.g. triamterene)
- Hypnotics (e.g. alonimid and phenobarbital) & Phenglutarimide
- Spasmolytics (e.g. pentapiperide, drofenine & dicycloverine) & Febuverine & Butetamate
- Stimulants (e.g. methylphenidate), mazindol & gamfexine & Levophacetoperane.
- Opioids (e.g. ethoheptazine, norpethidine, pethidine, properidine, phenoperidine).
- SERMs, e.g. Triphenylacrylonitrile [6304-33-2] (aka "TPAN")
- Fenclexonium (HOE-019)
- Benzetimide [14051-33-3] & Cinperene [14796-24-8]
- Pyrroxan
- MAOIs: 1-Phenylcyclobutylamine (PCBA) [17380-77-7] & 1-benzylcyclopropylamine.
- PRE-084
- Benzyl cyanide is used to make benzhydrylcyanide in Hoch's original procedure. This gives way to a large consortium of pharmaceuticals, c.f. methadone for example.
- Tolazoline

== Regulation ==
Because benzyl cyanide is a useful precursor to numerous drugs with recreational use potential, many countries strictly regulate the compound.

=== United States ===
Benzyl cyanide is regulated in the United States as a DEA List I chemical.

=== China ===
Benzyl cyanide is regulated in People's Republic of China as a Class III drug precursor since 7 June 2021.

== Safety ==
Benzyl cyanide, like related benzyl derivatives, is an irritant to the skin and eyes.

== See also ==
- Bromobenzyl cyanide
