= DPP-26 =

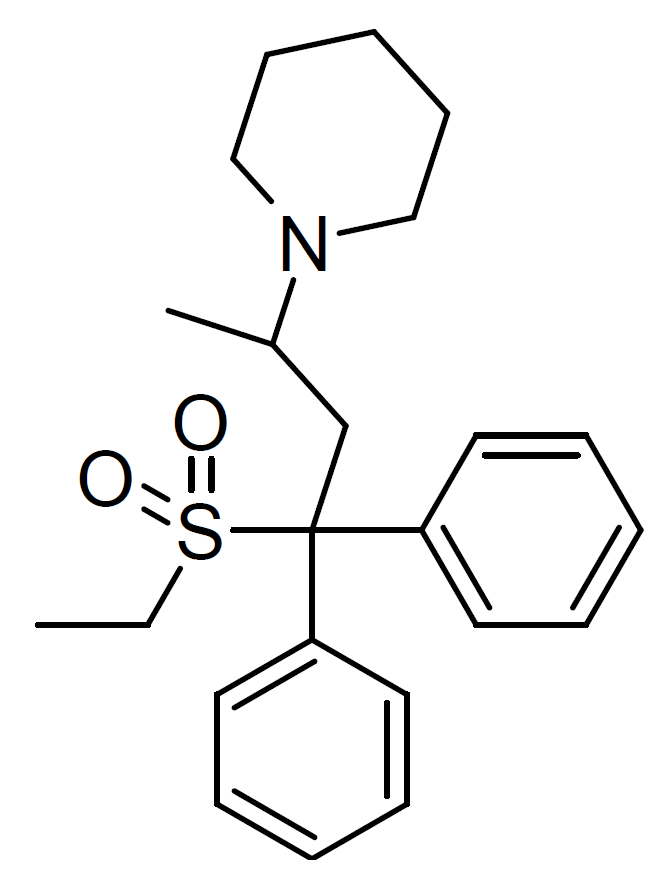

Identifiers
- IUPAC name: 1-(4-ethylsulfonyl-4,4-diphenylbutan-2-yl)piperidine
- CAS Number: 54160-30-4
- PubChem CID: 16206925
- ChemSpider: 17335064

Chemical and physical data
- Formula: C_{23}H_{31}NO_{2}S
- Molar mass: 385.57 g·mol^{−1}
- 3D model (JSmol): Interactive image
- SMILES: CCS(=O)(=O)C(CC(C)N1CCCCC1)(C2=CC=CC=C2)C3=CC=CC=C3
- InChI: InChI=1S/C23H31NO2S/c1-3-27(25,26)23(21-13-7-4-8-14-21,22-15-9-5-10-16-22)19-20(2)24-17-11-6-12-18-24/h4-5,7-10,13-16,20H,3,6,11-12,17-19H2,1-2H3; Key:ZVXQZJPYLLIYSB-UHFFFAOYSA-N

DPP-26 (DB-900274) is an opioid analgesic drug which has been sold as a designer drug. It is the sulfone analogue of dipipanone in the same way that IC-26 is the sulfone analogue of methadone.
