= C3H5Br =

The molecular formula C_{3}H_{5}Br may refer to:

- Allyl bromide
- Bromocyclopropane
