= Phenylacetaldoxime dehydratase =

Class of enzymes

Identifiers
- EC no.: 4.99.1.7

Databases
- IntEnz: IntEnz view
- BRENDA: BRENDA entry
- ExPASy: NiceZyme view
- KEGG: KEGG entry
- MetaCyc: metabolic pathway
- PRIAM: profile
- PDB structures: RCSB PDB PDBe PDBsum
Search
- PMC: articles
- PubMed: articles
- NCBI: proteins

In enzymology, a phenylacetaldoxime dehydratase (EC 4.99.1.7) is an enzyme that catalyzes the chemical reaction

(Z)-phenylacetaldehyde oxime $\rightleftharpoons$ phenylacetonitrile + H_{2}O

Hence, this enzyme has one substrate, (Z)-phenylacetaldehyde oxime, and two products, phenylacetonitrile and H_{2}O.

This enzyme belongs to the family of lyases, specifically the "catch-all" class of lyases that do not fit into any other sub-class. The systematic name of this enzyme class is (Z)-phenylacetaldehyde-oxime hydro-lyase (phenylacetonitrile-forming). Other names in common use include PAOx dehydratase, arylacetaldoxime dehydratase, OxdB, and (Z)-phenylacetaldehyde-oxime hydro-lyase. This enzyme participates in styrene degradation.
