= Dipyanone =

Opioid analgesic drug

Identifiers
- IUPAC name: 4,4-diphenyl-6-(1-pyrrolidinyl)-heptan-3-one
- CAS Number: 60996-94-3
- PubChem CID: 57483648
- ChemSpider: 128910076
- UNII: P8UN8D5PUN
- CompTox Dashboard (EPA): DTXSID401336888

Chemical and physical data
- Formula: C_{23}H_{29}NO
- Molar mass: 335.491 g·mol^{−1}
- 3D model (JSmol): Interactive image
- SMILES: CCC(=O)C(CC(C)N1CCCC1)(c1ccccc1)c1ccccc1
- InChI: InChI=1S/C23H29NO/c1-3-22(25)23(20-12-6-4-7-13-20,21-14-8-5-9-15-21)18-19(2)24-16-10-11-17-24/h4-9,12-15,19H,3,10-11,16-18H2,1-2H3; Key:LJIUPFDRFKFNJE-UHFFFAOYSA-N

Dipyanone is an opioid analgesic which has been sold as a designer drug, first identified in Germany in 2021. It is closely related to medically used drugs such as methadone, dipipanone and phenadoxone, but is slightly less potent.

== See also ==
- Desmethylmoramide
- IC-26
- Nufenoxole
- Pyrrolidinylthiambutene
- R-4066
