= C3H5I =

The molecular formula C_{3}H_{5}I may refer to:

- Allyl iodide
- Iodocyclopropane
