= Chlorocyclopropane =

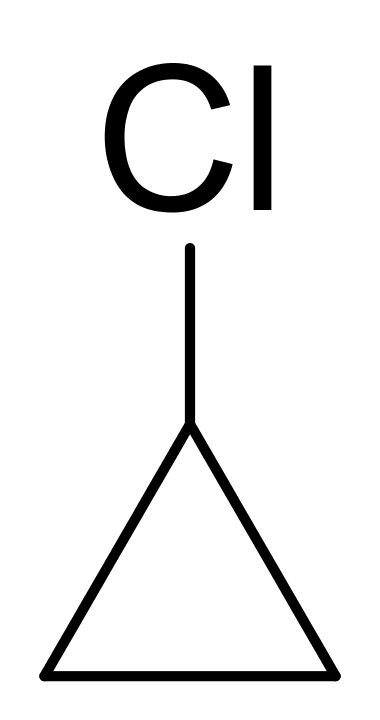

Names
- Preferred IUPAC name Chlorocyclopropane
- Other names Cyclopropyl chloride, cyclopropylchloride

Identifiers
CAS Number	7393-45-5
3D model (JSmol)	Interactive image
ChemSpider	73887
EC Number	230-988-0
PubChem CID	81879
UNII	2VAN2MPF6S
CompTox Dashboard (EPA)	DTXSID2064658
- InChI: InChI=1S/C3H5Cl/c4-3-1-2-3/h3H,1-2H2 Key: VEZNCHDBSQWUHQ-UHFFFAOYSA-N
- SMILES: C1CC1Cl

Properties
Chemical formula	C_{3}H_{5}Cl
Molar mass	76.52 g·mol^{−1}
Density	g/cm^{3}
Melting point	−97.68 °C (−143.82 °F; 175.47 K)

Related compounds
Related compounds	Fluorocyclopropane; Bromocyclopropane; Iodocyclopropane; Pentachlorocyclopropane
- Except where otherwise noted, data are given for materials in their standard state (at 25 °C [77 °F], 100 kPa). Infobox references

Chlorocyclopropane is a organochlorine compound with the chemical formula C_{3}H_{5}Cl. The compound is a member of haloalkane family.

== Synthesis ==
The compound can be obtained by photoreaction of cyclopropane and chlorine gas; the reaction will generate polychlorinated compounds, which can be separated by physical means.

== Chemical properties ==
The compound isomerizes on heating to 3-Chloropropene. Chlorocyclopropane reacts with lithium metal in ether to produce bicyclopropane. Also, it reacts with magnesium to obtain cyclopropylmagnesium chloride.

== See also ==
- Chloroalkanes
