= Iodocyclohexane =

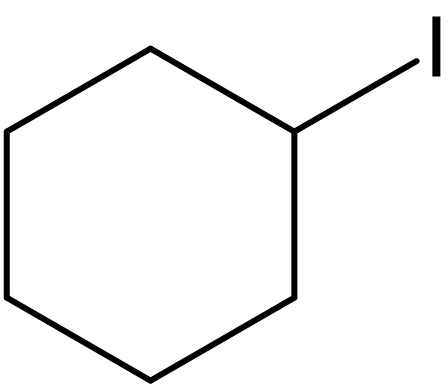

Names
- Preferred IUPAC name Iodocyclohexane
- Other names Cyclohexyl iodide

Identifiers
CAS Number	626-62-0
3D model (JSmol)	Interactive image
Abbreviations	CyI
ChemSpider	11786
ECHA InfoCard	100.009.962
EC Number	210-957-8
PubChem CID	12289
CompTox Dashboard (EPA)	DTXSID3060821
- InChI: InChI=1S/C6H11I/c7-6-4-2-1-3-5-6/h6H,1-5H2 Key: FUCOMWZKWIEKRK-UHFFFAOYSA-N
- SMILES: IC1CCCCC1

Properties
Chemical formula	C_{6}H_{11}I
Molar mass	210.058 g·mol^{−1}
Appearance	colorless to slightly reddish yellow liquid
Density	1.624 g/mL
Boiling point	180 °C (356 °F; 453 K)
Solubility in water	Insoluble

Hazards
- GHS labelling
Pictograms	(GHS07: Exclamation mark)
Signal word	Warning
Hazard statements	H315, H319, H335
Precautionary statements	P261, P264, P264+P265, P271, P280, P302+P352, P304+P340, P305+P351+P338, P319, P321, P332+P317, P337+P317, P362+P364, P403+P233, P405, P501
Flash point	71 °C (160 °F; 344 K)

Related compounds
Related compounds	Chlorocyclohexane; Bromocyclohexane; Fluorocyclohexane
- Except where otherwise noted, data are given for materials in their standard state (at 25 °C [77 °F], 100 kPa). Infobox references

Iodocyclohexane is an organoiodine compound with the chemical formula C_{6}H_{11}I or (CH_{2})_{5}CHI.

== Synthesis ==
Iodocyclohexane has been prepared by the addition of hydrogen iodide to cyclohexene.

Alternatively, it can be prepared by the reaction of cyclohexane and iodoform.

== Physical properties ==
Iodocyclohexane forms colorless to slightly reddish yellow liquid. It is soluble in ethanol, ether, and acetone.

== Uses ==
The compound has been used as reagent in demethylation of aryl methyl ethers in DMF under reflux condition.

== See also ==
- Iodoalkanes
- Iodobenzene
