= Hydroxyphenamate =

Chemical compound

Clinical data
- Trade names: Listica

Legal status
- Legal status: BR: Class C1 (Other controlled substances)

Identifiers
- IUPAC name: (2-hydroxy-2-phenylbutyl) carbamate
- CAS Number: 50-19-1
- PubChem CID: 5752
- ChemSpider: 5549
- UNII: MD0414799X
- KEGG: D04476
- ChEBI: CHEBI:134877
- ChEMBL: ChEMBL2107215
- CompTox Dashboard (EPA): DTXSID40861571
- ECHA InfoCard: 100.000.016

Chemical and physical data
- Formula: C_{11}H_{15}NO_{3}
- Molar mass: 209.245 g·mol^{−1}
- 3D model (JSmol): Interactive image
- SMILES: CCC(COC(=O)N)(C1=CC=CC=C1)O
- InChI: InChI=1S/C11H15NO3/c1-2-11(14,8-15-10(12)13)9-6-4-3-5-7-9/h3-7,14H,2,8H2,1H3,(H2,12,13); Key:WAFIYOULDIWAKR-UHFFFAOYSA-N

Hydroxyphenamate or oxyfenamate (trade name Listica) is a sedative and anxiolytic drug of the carbamate class which is no longer marketed in the US. Like other carbamate sedatives, it is chemically related to meprobamate (Miltown). It was introduced to the US market in 1961. The dosage for adults is 200 mg 3 to 4 times daily.

== Synthesis ==
The reaction of propiophenone (1) with cyanide gives 2-hydroxy-2-phenylbutanenitrile (2). Acid hydrolysis of the nitrile to a carboxylic acid gives 2-hydroxy-2-phenylbutanoic acid (3). The reduction by hydride of the acid to the alcohol gives 2-phenyl-1,2-butanediol (4). For the final step in the synthesis, treatment with ethyl chloroformate followed by addition of aqueous ammonia gave the carbamate, and hence hydroxyphenamate (5).

Synthesis of hydroxyphenamate
