= Trifluoromethyldeschloroketamine =

Chemical compound

Clinical data
- ATC code: none

Legal status
- Legal status: CA: Schedule I; UK: Under Psychoactive Substances Act

Identifiers
- IUPAC name: 2-(methylamino)-2-[2-(trifluoromethyl)phenyl]cyclohexan-1-one
- CAS Number: 1782149-73-8
- PubChem CID: 117067835
- UNII: GW3LZ66WZ6

Chemical and physical data
- Formula: C_{14}H_{16}F_{3}NO
- Molar mass: 271.283 g·mol^{−1}
- 3D model (JSmol): Interactive image
- SMILES: CNC1(CCCCC1=O)C2=CC=CC=C2C(F)(F)F
- InChI: InChI=1S/C14H16F3NO/c1-18-13(9-5-4-8-12(13)19)10-6-2-3-7-11(10)14(15,16)17/h2-3,6-7,18H,4-5,8-9H2,1H3; Key:LETHPPJNGNSLDJ-UHFFFAOYSA-N

Trifluoromethyldeschloroketamine (TFMDCK) is a designer drug from the arylcyclohexylamine family, which is presumed to have similar properties to ketamine, a dissociative anesthetic drug with hallucinogenic and sedative effects. It has been sold over the internet since around 2016, though genuine samples appear to be rare. The o-trifluoromethyl analogue of hydroxynorketamine has also been researched as an antidepressant.

== See also ==
- Bromoketamine
- Deschloroketamine
- Methoxyketamine
- Methoxmetamine
