= Cyclohexyl chloride =

Names
- Preferred IUPAC name Chlorocyclohexane
- Other names Cyclohexyl chloride, CyCl

Identifiers
CAS Number	542-18-7
3D model (JSmol)	Interactive image
Abbreviations	CyCl
ChemSpider	10487
ECHA InfoCard	100.008.006
PubChem CID	10952
UNII	PNV8C821FH
CompTox Dashboard (EPA)	DTXSID3052193
- InChI: InChI=1S/C6H11Cl/c7-6-4-2-1-3-5-6/h6H,1-5H2 Key: UNFUYWDGSFDHCW-UHFFFAOYSA-N; InChI=1/C6H11Cl/c7-6-4-2-1-3-5-6/h6H,1-5H2 Key: UNFUYWDGSFDHCW-UHFFFAOYAR
- SMILES: C1CCC(CC1)Cl

Properties
Chemical formula	C_{6}H_{11}Cl
Molar mass	118.60 g·mol^{−1}
Density	1 g/mL
Melting point	−44 °C (−47 °F; 229 K)
Boiling point	142 °C (288 °F; 415 K)
Solubility in water	low

Hazards
- GHS labelling
Pictograms	(GHS02: Flammable) (GHS07: Exclamation mark) (GHS09: Environmental hazard)
Signal word	Warning
Hazard statements	H226, H312, H315, H319, H335, H411
Precautionary statements	P210, P233, P240, P241, P242, P243, P261, P264, P264+P265, P271, P273, P280, P302+P352, P303+P361+P353, P304+P340, P305+P351+P338, P317, P319, P321, P332+P317, P337+P317, P362+P364, P370+P378, P391, P403+P233, P403+P235, P405, P501
Flash point	47 °C (117 °F; 320 K)

Related compounds
Related compounds	Fluorocyclohexane; Bromocyclohexane; Iodocyclohexane
- Except where otherwise noted, data are given for materials in their standard state (at 25 °C [77 °F], 100 kPa). Infobox references

Cyclohexyl chloride (or chlorocyclohexane) is a chlorinated hydrocarbon with the formula C_{6}H_{11}Cl or (CH_{2})_{5}CHCl. It is a colorless liquid.

Cyclohexyl chloride can be prepared from cyclohexanol by treatment with hydrogen chloride.
