= Bromocyclopentane =

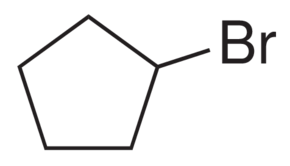

Names
- Preferred IUPAC name Bromocyclopentane
- Other names Cyclopentyl Bromide

Identifiers
| CAS Number | 137-43-9 |
| 3D model (JSmol) | Interactive image |
| ChemSpider | 8400 |
| ECHA InfoCard | 100.004.813 |
| PubChem CID | 8728 |
| UNII | QP65Z83BNY |
| CompTox Dashboard (EPA) | DTXSID9059670 |
- InChI: InChI=1S/C5H9Br/c6-5-3-1-2-4-5/h5H,1-4H2 Key: BRTFVKHPEHKBQF-UHFFFAOYSA-N; InChI=1S/C5H9Br/c6-5-3-1-2-4-5/h5H,1-4H2 Key: BRTFVKHPEHKBQF-UHFFFAOYSA-N
- SMILES: C1CCC(C1)Br

Properties
| Chemical formula | C_{5}H_{9}Br |
| Molar mass | 149.031 g·mol^{−1} |
| Appearance | Colorless or pale yellow liquid |
| Density | 1.473 g/cm^{3} |
| Boiling point | 138 °C (280 °F; 411 K) |

Hazards
| Flash point | 42 °C (108 °F; 315 K) |

Related compounds
| Related compounds | Bromocyclopropane; Bromocyclobutane; Bromocyclohexane |
- Except where otherwise noted, data are given for materials in their standard state (at 25 °C [77 °F], 100 kPa). Infobox references

Bromocyclopentane is a derivative of cyclopentane, an alkyl halide with the chemical formula C_{5}H_{9}Br. It is a colorless to light yellow liquid at standard temperature and pressure.

== Uses ==
Bromocyclopentane is reacted with magnesium turnings in dry tetrahydrofuran making cyclopentyl Grignard reagent, a main precursor in the synthesis of Ketamine. It is used in elimination reactions to create additional chemicals.

Bromocyclpopentane is one of the few compounds used to study infrared spectroscopy.
