= Deschloroketamine =

Chemical compound

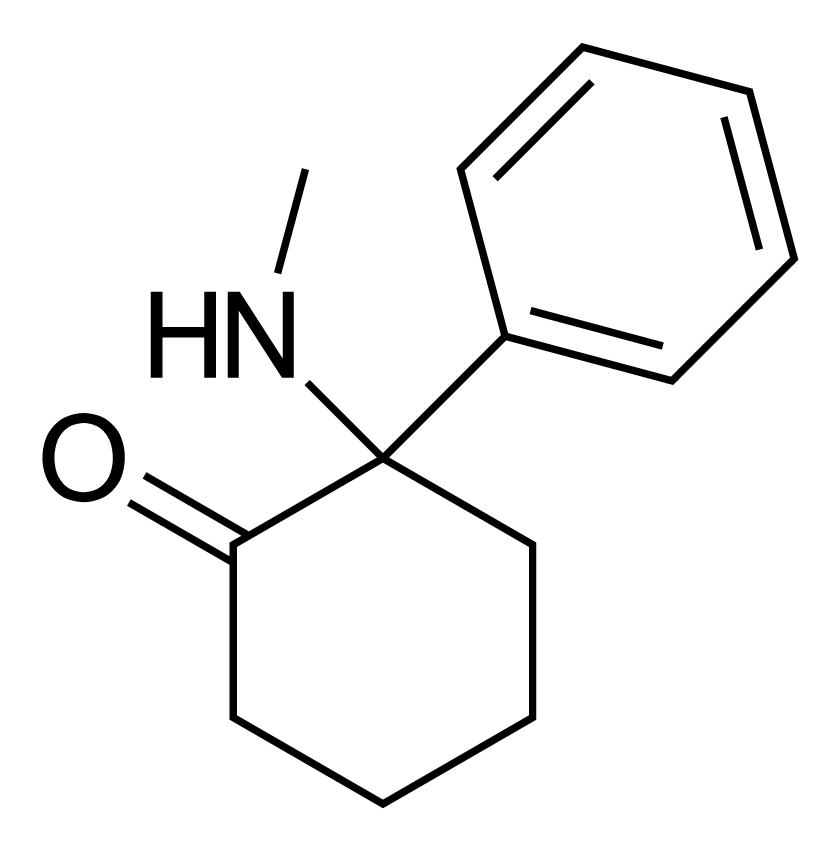

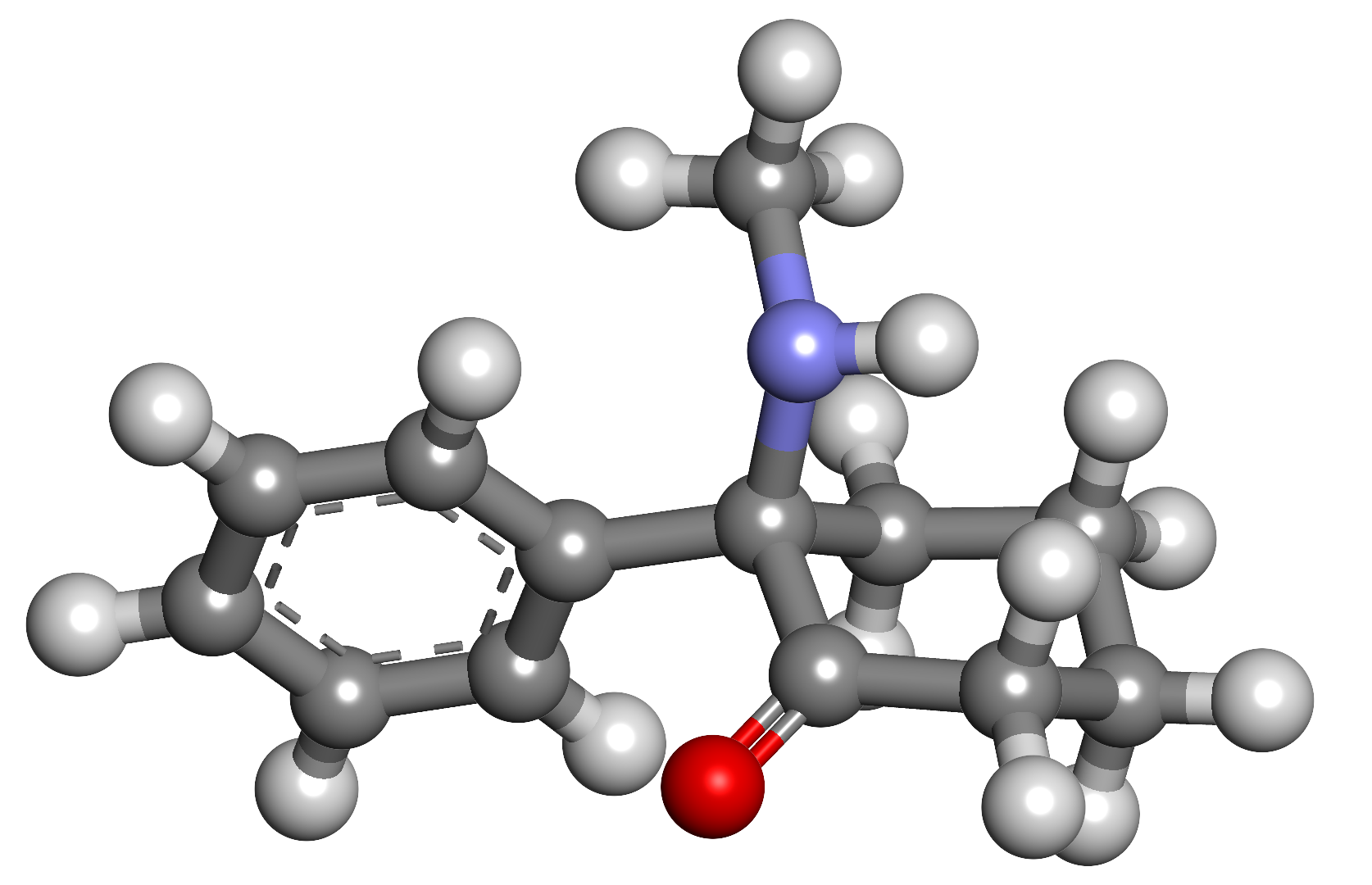

Legal status
- Legal status: CA: Schedule I; DE: NpSG (Industrial and scientific use only); UK: Class B; Illegal in Latvia

Identifiers
- IUPAC name: 2-Phenyl-2-(methylamino)cyclohexanone
- CAS Number: 7063-30-1; hydrochloride: 4631-27-0
- PubChem CID: 437168
- ChemSpider: 386687
- UNII: B0J1D1S3EI; hydrochloride: H3MA78UVN7
- ChEMBL: ChEMBL2068808
- CompTox Dashboard (EPA): DTXSID701342024 DTXSID10595730, DTXSID701342024

Chemical and physical data
- Formula: C_{13}H_{17}NO
- Molar mass: 203.285 g·mol^{−1}
- 3D model (JSmol): Interactive image
- SMILES: CNC1(CCCCC1=O)c2ccccc2
- InChI: InChI=1S/C13H17NO/c1-14-13(10-6-5-9-12(13)15)11-7-3-2-4-8-11/h2-4,7-8,14H,5-6,9-10H2,1H3; Key:ZAGBSZSITDFFAF-UHFFFAOYSA-N

Deschloroketamine (DXE, DCK, 2'-Oxo-PCM) is a dissociative anesthetic that has been sold online as a designer drug. It has also been proposed for the treatment of bacterial, fungal, viral or protozoal infections and for immunomodulation at doses of 2 mg per day.

== Legal status ==
=== Canada ===
Deschloroketamine is likely schedule 1 in Canada as an analogue of PCP.

=== Latvia ===
Deschloroketamine is illegal in Latvia.

== See also ==
- Ketamine
- 2-Fluorodeschloroketamine
- 3-Fluorodeschloroketamine
- Bromoketamine
- Methoxmetamine
- Trifluoromethyldeschloroketamine
- Rhynchophylline
