= SN 35210 =

Chemical compound

Clinical data
- ATC code: none

Legal status
- Legal status: Investigational new drug

Identifiers
- IUPAC name: Methyl 4-{[1-(2-chlorophenyl)-2-oxocyclohexyl]amino}pentanoate
- CAS Number: 1450615-41-4
- PubChem CID: 71769517
- UNII: DS5KFJ4488
- CompTox Dashboard (EPA): DTXSID501336455

Chemical and physical data
- Formula: C_{18}H_{24}ClNO_{3}
- Molar mass: 337.84 g·mol^{−1}
- 3D model (JSmol): Interactive image
- SMILES: Clc1ccccc1C2(NCCCCC(=O)OC)CCCCC2=O
- InChI: InChI=1S/C18H24ClNO3/c1-23-17(22)11-5-7-13-20-18(12-6-4-10-16(18)21)14-8-2-3-9-15(14)19/h2-3,8-9,20H,4-7,10-13H2,1H3; Key:QFFBIIVCZDWTKZ-UHFFFAOYSA-N

SN 35210 is an arylcyclohexylamine dissociative anesthetic drug. It was derived from ketamine with the intention of producing a shorter acting agent more suitable to be used as a stand-alone drug, whereas ketamine itself generally has to be used in combination with other drugs such as midazolam to minimise the occurrence of emergence reactions due to its hallucinogenic side effects. In common with other short-acting anaesthetic drugs such as remifentanil and remimazolam, SN 35210 has had the chemical structure modified to incorporate a methyl ester group which is rapidly metabolised to a carboxylic acid, producing an inactive compound and thus rapidly terminating the effects of the drug. It was selected for development from a series of structurally related alkyl esters due to having the shortest duration of action and the most similar pharmacological profile to ketamine itself.

== See also ==
- A-NK
