= Methoxyketamine =

Names
- IUPAC name 2-(2-Methoxyphenyl)-2-(methylamino)cyclohexanone

Identifiers
CAS Number	7063-51-6; 6728-62-7 (HCl)
3D model (JSmol)	Interactive image
ChemSpider	27470964
PubChem CID	57483650
UNII	U4I8JIS24N; 2OVB5UO35R (HCl)
CompTox Dashboard (EPA)	DTXSID30990849
- InChI: InChI=1S/C14H19NO2/c1-15-14(10-6-5-9-13(14)16)11-7-3-4-8-12(11)17-2/h3-4,7-8,15H,5-6,9-10H2,1-2H3 Key: OYAUVHORXFUVAJ-UHFFFAOYSA-N; InChI=1/C14H19NO2/c1-15-14(10-6-5-9-13(14)16)11-7-3-4-8-12(11)17-2/h3-4,7-8,15H,5-6,9-10H2,1-2H3 Key: OYAUVHORXFUVAJ-UHFFFAOYAM
- SMILES: CNC1(CCCCC1=O)c2ccccc2OC

Properties
Chemical formula	C_{14}H_{19}NO_{2}
Molar mass	233.311 g·mol^{−1}

Pharmacology
Legal status	UK: Class B
- Except where otherwise noted, data are given for materials in their standard state (at 25 °C [77 °F], 100 kPa). Infobox references

Methoxyketamine or 2-MeO-2-deschloroketamine is a designer drug of the arylcyclohexylamine class first reported in 1963. It is an analog of ketamine in which the chlorine atom has been replaced with a methoxy group. Its synthesis by rearrangement of an amino ketone has been reported. As an arylcyclohexylamine, methoxyketamine most likely functions as an NMDA receptor antagonist. It produces sedative, hallucinogenic, and (at high doses) anesthetic effects, but with a lower potency than ketamine itself.

== See also ==
- 2-Fluorodeschloroketamine
- Bromoketamine
- Methoxmetamine
- Trifluoromethyldeschloroketamine
