= Desmethylmoramide =

Opioid analgesic drug

Names
- Preferred IUPAC name 4-(Morpholin-4-yl)-2,2-diphenyl-1-(pyrrolidin-1-yl)butan-1-one

Identifiers
CAS Number	1767-88-0
3D model (JSmol)	Interactive image
ChEMBL	ChEMBL2106152
ChemSpider	178501
PubChem CID	206005
UNII	9B1Z1V29C3
CompTox Dashboard (EPA)	DTXSID60170172
- InChI: InChI=1S/C24H30N2O2/c27-23(26-14-7-8-15-26)24(21-9-3-1-4-10-21,22-11-5-2-6-12-22)13-16-25-17-19-28-20-18-25/h1-6,9-12H,7-8,13-20H2 Key: JRPANCYSRUEJDY-UHFFFAOYSA-N
- SMILES: C1CCN(C1)C(=O)C(CCN2CCOCC2)(C3=CC=CC=C3)C4=CC=CC=C4

Properties
Chemical formula	C_{24}H_{30}N_{2}O_{2}
Molar mass	378.516 g·mol^{−1}
- Except where otherwise noted, data are given for materials in their standard state (at 25 °C [77 °F], 100 kPa). Infobox references

Desmethylmoramide (INN) is an opioid analgesic related to dextromoramide (the active (+)-isomer of moramide) that was synthesized and characterized in the late 1950s but was never marketed. It has since been reported as a designer drug.

== See also ==
- Dipyanone
- Nufenoxole
- Phenadoxone
