= Hoch-Campbell ethylenimine synthesis =

In organic chemistry the Hoch-Campbell ethylenimine synthesis is a method for constructing ethyleneimines from oximes. The oxime is treated with Grignard reagents:

Hoch-Campbell Ethylenimine Synthesis

The above product is called 3-methyl-2,2-diphenylaziridine [7764-13-8]. Campbell describes a compound that is called 2-amino-1,1-diphenylpropan-1-ol [57728-35-5]. This is an open-chain analog of pipradrol. 99% of the theoretical yield can be achieved by Grignard addition of two equivalents of phenylmagnesium bromide to alanine ethyl ester. This compound has remarkable similarity to Diphepanol & Hexapradol.

N.B. Joseph Hoch was the first chemist to invent diphenylacetonitrile.
