= 2-Fluorodeschloroketamine =

Chemical compound

Legal status
- Legal status: CA: Schedule I; DE: Anlage II (Authorized trade only, not prescriptible); UK: Class B; Illegal in Italy, Japan, Latvia, Singapore, Sweden and Switzerland

Identifiers
- IUPAC name: 2-(2-Fluorophenyl)-2-methylamino-cyclohexanone
- CAS Number: 111982-50-4
- PubChem CID: 13771618
- ChemSpider: 43515873
- UNII: D57WIH0RIT
- CompTox Dashboard (EPA): DTXSID001018395

Chemical and physical data
- Formula: C_{13}H_{16}FNO
- Molar mass: 221.275 g·mol^{−1}
- 3D model (JSmol): Interactive image
- SMILES: CNC1(CCCCC1=O)c2ccccc2F
- InChI: InChI=1S/C13H16FNO/c1-15-13(9-5-4-8-12(13)16)10-6-2-3-7-11(10)14/h2-3,6-7,15H,4-5,8-9H2,1H3; Key:PHFAGYYTDLITTB-UHFFFAOYSA-N

2-Fluorodeschloroketamine (also known as 2'-Fl-2-Oxo-PCM, fluoroketamine, and 2-FDCK) is a dissociative anesthetic related to ketamine. Its sale and use as a designer drug has been reported in various countries. It is an analogue of ketamine where the chlorine group has been replaced by fluorine. Due to its recent emergence, the pharmacological specifics of the compound are mostly unclear, but effects are reported to be similar to its parent compound, ketamine.

== History ==
The synthesis of 2-FDCK was first described in a 2013 paper as part of a larger effort to synthesize and evaluate new anesthetic drugs based on ketamine and its analogues. Ketamine itself was first introduced in 1964 and was approved for clinical use in 1970. Since then it has become one of the most important and applicable general anesthetics as well as a popular recreational drug.

The use of 2-FDCK as a research chemical has been reported in various countries. Many of these new psychoactive substances (NPS) appear on the drug market in order to circumvent existing drug policies. 2-FDCK was first formally notified by the EMCDDA in 2016, alongside 65 other new substances. Due to its recent appearance, little research has been done on the compound so far.

In January 2023, Israeli Biotech company "Clearmind Medicine Inc." announced the successful completion of a preclinical study examining 2-FDCK in a rat model of depression, with the compound outperforming ketamine in longevity of antidepressant effect.

== Chemistry ==
=== Structure ===
The full chemical name of 2-FDCK is 2-(2-fluorophenyl)-2-(methylamino)cyclohexan-1-one.

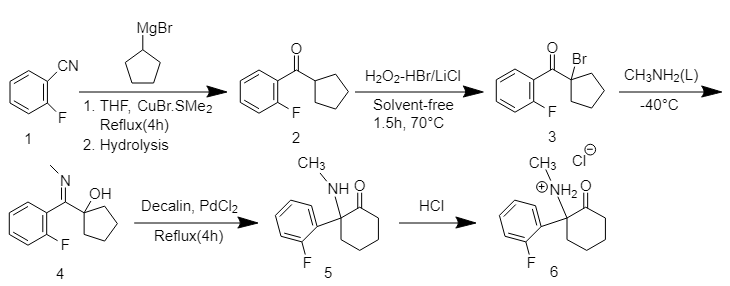
Preparation of 2-FDCK from fluorobenzonitrile.

2-FDCK belongs to a class of compounds called arylcyclohexylamines which contains various other drugs such as PCP and ketamine. Their general structure consists of a cyclohexylamine unit with an aryl group attached to the same carbon as the amine. 2-FDCK has an o-fluorophenyl group as an aryl substituent and the amine group is methylated. The cyclohexyl ring features a ketone group next to the amine position.

The chemical structure of 2-FDCK differs from ketamine only in that there is a fluorine atom attached to the phenyl group. Ketamine has a chlorine atom in that position.

=== Synthesis ===
2-FDCK can be synthesized in a five-step reaction process. First 2-fluorobenzonitrile reacts with the Grignard reagent cyclopentyl magnesium bromide followed by a bromination reaction to obtain α-bromocyclopentyl-(2-fluorophenyl)-ketone. The reaction of the obtained ketone with methylamine at −40 °C then results in the formation of α-hydroxycyclopentyl-(2-fluorophenyl)-N-methylamine. Finally, the five-membered ring cyclopentanol form is expanded to a cyclohexylketone form by a thermal rearrangement reaction. HCl is used to create a water-soluble HCl salt of 2-FDCK.

=== Detection ===
2-FDCK and its metabolites can be detected in urine with the use of liquid chromatography mass spectrometry (LC/MS).

== Pharmacology ==
=== Metabolism ===
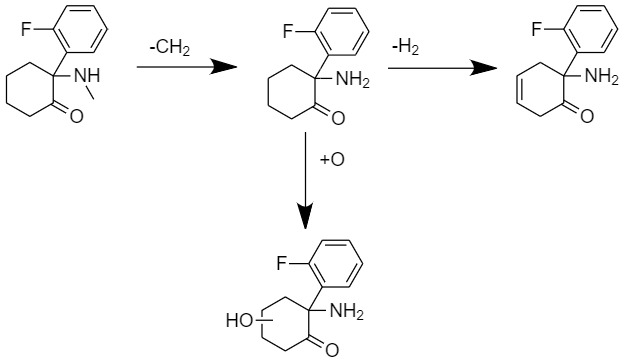
Multistep metabolism of 2-FDCK. The process starts at 2-FDCK itself, which is then converted to nor-2-FDCK. This compound can then undergo transformation to either dehydro-nor-2-FDCK or hydroxy-nor-2-FDCK.

The metabolism of 2-FDCK is analogous to that of ketamine: the enzymes CYP2B6 and CYP3A4, the latter to a lesser extent, metabolise 2-FDCK to Nor-2FDCK via N-demethylation. This is further metabolised either to dehydronor-2FDCK by CYP2B6 or to hydroxynor-2FDCK by CYP2A6 and CYP2B6.

In general, the 2-FDCK equivalent shows stronger docking to CYP2B6 in simulations, as well as slower metabolism rate, than the more well-known ketamine. The lipophilicity is observed to be lower for 2-FDCK than for ketamine. In vitro to in vivo extrapolation predicts that in the body, 2-FDCK shows a lower intrinsic hepatic clearance than ketamine. Both of these characteristics would suggest that the effects of 2-FDCK last longer than those of ketamine.

=== Pharmacodynamics ===
2-FDCK is structurally similar to ketamine, so a similar mechanism of action is expected, but there has been no study done to confirm this. Due to the halogen in the 2 position not being a chlorine but a fluorine, the molecule is more polar. This could influence binding to proteins, such as the NMDA receptor that ketamine primarily binds to and acts as an antagonist towards.

==== Comparison to other halogen-substituted ketamine variants ====
For general (halogen) substitutions of ketamine, docking strength for CYP2B6 follows the pattern H < Br < Cl < F. The parameter of internal clearance follows the pattern Br > Cl > F > H. Lastly, K_{m} (Michaelis constant) follows the pattern of Br < Cl < F < H, and as such the in-vitro metabolism rate follows the inverse pattern, namely Br > Cl > F > H.

== Adverse effects ==
=== Possible effects and dangers ===
In 2019, 2-FDCK was found in poisoned individuals in Hong Kong in combination with other ketamine-type drugs.

== Legal status ==
Due to the fast emergence of NPS, new substances such as 2-FDCK are often not yet specifically mentioned in controlled substance legislation. As a result, NPS are sometimes marketed as "legal highs". 2-FDCK is currently illegal in Italy Japan, Latvia, Singapore, Sweden, Switzerland, as well as being covered by blanket bans in Canada, Belgium, and the UK.

In October 2023 the ECDD recommended that 2-FDCK be added to Schedule II of the Convention on Psychotropic Substances of 1971.

As of February 2026 2F-DCK is banned in the Netherlands and not sold anymore by research chemical shops, being replaced by 2F-NENDCK.

=== United States ===
On January 20, 2026 the DEA announced a temporary order to add 2-FDCK to Schedule 1 under the Controlled Substances Act on or after February 19, 2026.

== See also ==
- List of investigational hallucinogens and entactogens
- 2F-NENDCK
- 2-FXPr
- 3-Fluorodeschloroketamine
- Blixeprodil
- Bromoketamine
- Deschloroketamine
- Fluorexetamine
- Methoxyketamine
- Trifluoromethyldeschloroketamine
