= IC-26 =

Chemical compound

Identifiers
- IUPAC name: 4-ethylsulfonyl-N,N-dimethyl-4,4-diphenylbutan-2-amine
- CAS Number: 114538-73-7 60662-79-5 (hydrochloride)
- PubChem CID: 113832
- ChemSpider: 102014
- UNII: ZSY3T8J4AQ
- CompTox Dashboard (EPA): DTXSID401018280

Chemical and physical data
- Formula: C_{20}H_{27}NO_{2}S
- Molar mass: 345.50 g·mol^{−1}
- 3D model (JSmol): Interactive image
- SMILES: CCS(=O)(=O)C(CC(C)N(C)C)(C1=CC=CC=C1)C2=CC=CC=C2
- InChI: InChI=1S/C20H27NO2S/c1-5-24(22,23)20(16-17(2)21(3)4,18-12-8-6-9-13-18)19-14-10-7-11-15-19/h6-15,17H,5,16H2,1-4H3; Key:NLPGJSPLDNDKKZ-UHFFFAOYSA-N

IC-26 (WIN 1161-3, Methiodone) is an analogue of the opioid analgesic methadone, where the carbonyl group has been replaced by the bioisosteric sulfone group.

Human and animal studies suggest that IC-26 is around the same potency as methadone, although other studies have found its activity to be inconsistent between different patients, with consistent opioid activity only being seen at a dose several times that of methadone. IC-26 was assessed for its abuse potential, but despite being found to have similar potential to morphine for development of dependence it was never placed under international control as an illegal drug. It has appeared as a designer drug, first reported in 2025, along with the corresponding piperidine analogue DPP-26.

== See also ==
- Dextromoramide
- Dipipanone
- MT-45
- Phenadoxone
