= Fluorocyclohexane =

Names
- Preferred IUPAC name Fluorocyclohexane
- Other names Cyclohexyl fluoride

Identifiers
CAS Number	372-46-3
3D model (JSmol)	Interactive image
Abbreviations	FCH; CHF; CyF
ChemSpider	71321
ECHA InfoCard	100.006.141
EC Number	206-754-9
PubChem CID	78988
CompTox Dashboard (EPA)	DTXSID5059907
- InChI: InChI=1S/C6H11F/c7-6-4-2-1-3-5-6/h6H,1-5H2 Key: GOBGVVAHHOUMDK-UHFFFAOYSA-N
- SMILES: C1CCC(CC1)F

Properties
Chemical formula	C_{6}H_{11}F
Molar mass	102.152 g·mol^{−1}
Appearance	Colorless liquid
Density	0.9280 g/mL
Melting point	13 °C (55 °F; 286 K)
Boiling point	103 °C (217 °F; 376 K)
Solubility in water	Insoluble

Hazards
- GHS labelling
Pictograms	(GHS02: Flammable) (GHS07: Exclamation mark)
Signal word	Danger
Hazard statements	H225, H315, H319, H335
Precautionary statements	P210, P233, P240, P241, P242, P243, P261, P264, P264+P265, P271, P280, P302+P352, P303+P361+P353, P304+P340, P305+P351+P338, P319, P321, P332+P317, P337+P317, P362+P364, P370+P378, P403+P233, P403+P235, P405, P501
Flash point	5 °C (41 °F; 278 K)

Related compounds
Related compounds	Chlorocyclohexane; Bromocyclohexane; Iodocyclohexane
- Except where otherwise noted, data are given for materials in their standard state (at 25 °C [77 °F], 100 kPa). Infobox references

Fluorocyclohexane is an organofluorine compound with the chemical formula (CH_{2})_{5}CHF. It is a colorless combustable liquid.

Fluorocyclohexane can by prepared by reaction of cyclohexanol with hydrogen fluoride.

== See also ==
- Fluoroalkanes
- Fluorocyclopropane
- Fluorobenzene
