= Fluorocyclopropane =

Names
- Preferred IUPAC name Fluorocyclopropane
- Other names Cyclopropyl fluoride, cyclopropylfluoride

Identifiers
CAS Number	1959-79-1
3D model (JSmol)	Interactive image
ChemSpider	10328768
EC Number	212-459-6
PubChem CID	15248120
CompTox Dashboard (EPA)	DTXSID70570447
- InChI: InChI=1S/C3H5F/c4-3-1-2-3/h3H,1-2H2 Key: XAVRRVJJYIFROR-UHFFFAOYSA-N
- SMILES: C1CC1F

Properties
Chemical formula	C_{3}H_{5}F
Molar mass	60.071 g·mol^{−1}
Density	g/cm^{3}
Solubility in water	Insoluble

Related compounds
Related compounds	Chlorocyclopropane; Bromocyclopropane; Iodocyclopropane
- Except where otherwise noted, data are given for materials in their standard state (at 25 °C [77 °F], 100 kPa). Infobox references

Fluorocyclopropane is an organofluorine compound with the chemical formula C_{3}H_{5}F. The compound is a member of haloalkane family.

== Synthesis ==
The compound can be produced by reacting imidazolylidene cyclopropyl group with xenon difluoride.

Also, a reaction of enantioselective cyclopropanation of fluoro-substituted allylic alcohols using zinc carbenoids.

== See also ==
- Fluoroalkanes
- Fluorocyclohexane

== Extra reading ==
- Dall'O, L.; Heydtmann, H. (January 1987). "Kinetic Study of Chemically Activated Fluorocyclopropane". Berichte der Bunsengesellschaft für physikalische Chemie. 91 (1): 24–30. doi:10.1002/bbpc.19870910107.
- Casas, F.; Kerr, J. A.; Trotman-Dickenson, A. F. (1964). "706. Fluorinated cyclopropanes. Part II. The thermal isomerization of monofluorocyclopropane". Journal of the Chemical Society (Resumed): 3655. doi:10.1039/JR9640003655.
