= Lomevactone =

Chemical compound

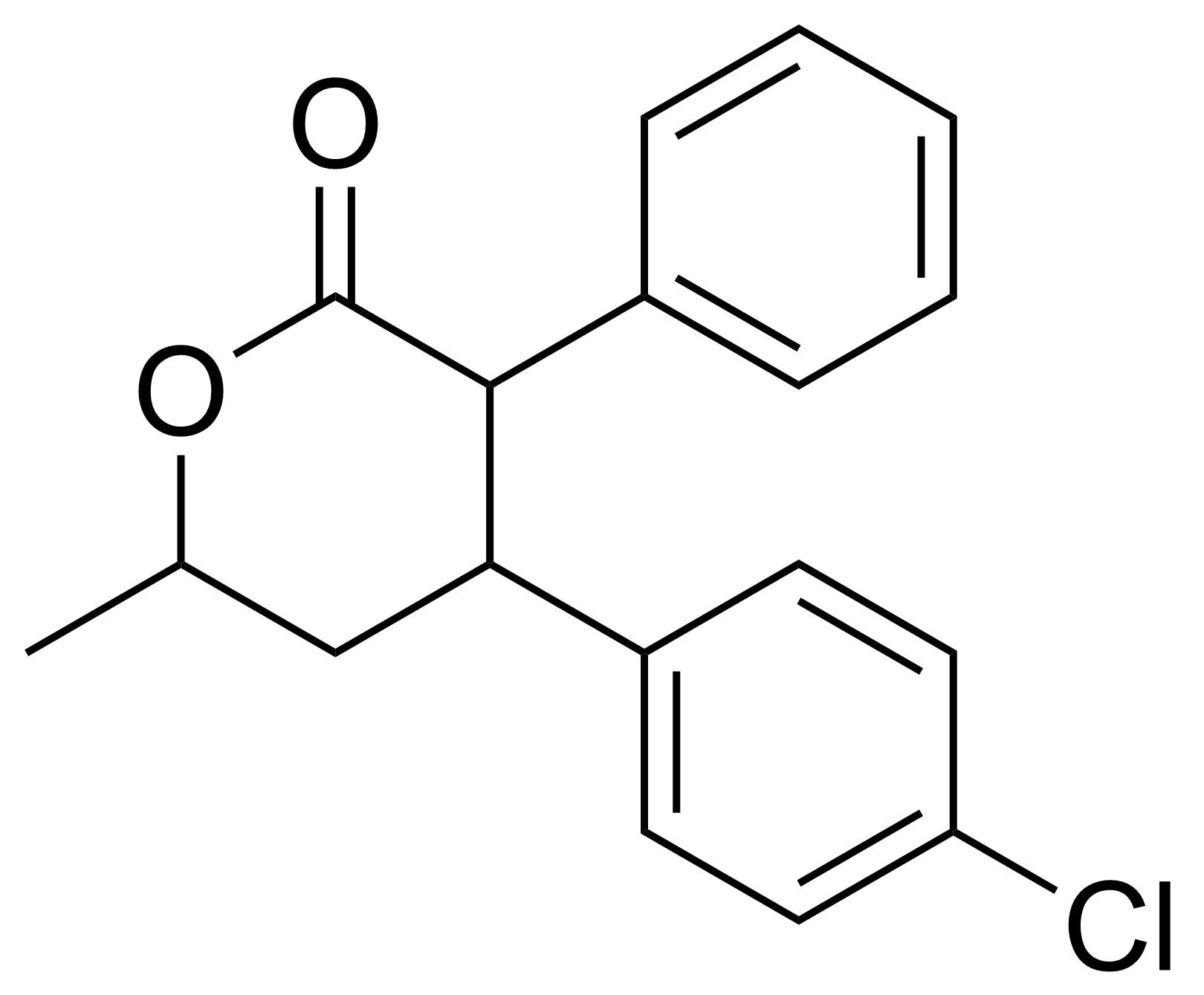

Clinical data
- ATC code: None

Identifiers
- IUPAC name: 4-(4-Chlorophenyl)-6-methyl-3-phenyltetrahydro-2H-pyran-2-one
- CAS Number: 81478-25-3 (3R,4R,6R): 82510-81-4 rel-(3R,4R,6R): 75115-73-0
- PubChem CID: 100079
- ChemSpider: 90435
- UNII: TP71SPS85C
- CompTox Dashboard (EPA): DTXSID601024659

Chemical and physical data
- Formula: C_{18}H_{17}ClO_{2}
- Molar mass: 300.78 g·mol^{−1}
- 3D model (JSmol): Interactive image
- SMILES: Clc1ccc(cc1)C2C(C(=O)OC(C)C2)c3ccccc3

Lomevactone (INN; developmental code name DR-250) is a drug described as a psychostimulant and antidepressant which was synthesized and assayed in the 1980s, but was never marketed.

== Stereoisomers ==
There are eight possible stereoisomers of lomevactone. It is the (3R,4R,6R)-form that has the psychotherapeutic properties.

(3R,4R,6R)-Lomevactone

== Synthesis ==
The conjugate 1,4-alkylation reaction between 4-chlorobenzylideneacetone (1) and phenylacetonitrile (2) gives 3-(4-chlorophenyl)-5-oxo-2-phenylhexanenitrile (3). The selective reduction of the keto group to the alcohol with sodium borohydride gives 3-(4-chlorophenyl)-5-hydroxy-2-phenylhexanenitrile (4). Hydrolysis of the nitrile to an acid gives 3-(4-chlorophenyl)-5-hydroxy-2-phenylhexanoic acid. This is followed by lactone formation completing the synthesis of lomevactone (5).

Synthesis: Patents:
