= Iodocyclopropane =

Names
- Preferred IUPAC name Iodocyclopropane
- Other names Cyclopropyl iodide, cyclopropyliodide

Identifiers
CAS Number	19451-11-7
3D model (JSmol)	Interactive image
ChemSpider	555999
EC Number	818-892-2
PubChem CID	640653
- InChI: InChI=1S/C3H5I/c4-3-1-2-3/h3H,1-2H2 Key: VLODBNNWEWTQJX-UHFFFAOYSA-N
- SMILES: C1CC1I

Properties
Chemical formula	C_{3}H_{5}I
Molar mass	167.977 g·mol^{−1}
Appearance	Liquid
Density	g/cm^{3}

Hazards
- GHS labelling
Pictograms	(GHS07: Exclamation mark)
Hazard statements	H315, H319, H335

Related compounds
Related compounds	Fluorocyclopropane; Bromocyclopropane; Chlorocyclopropane
- Except where otherwise noted, data are given for materials in their standard state (at 25 °C [77 °F], 100 kPa). Infobox references

Iodocyclopropane is a organoiodine compound with the chemical formula C_{3}H_{5}I. The compound is a member of haloalkane family.

== Chemical properties ==
The compound reacts with benzoxazole to produce 2-cyclopropylbenzoxazole in presence of palladium catalyst.

== Uses ==
Iodocyclopropanes are used as synthetic intermediates to synthesize many alkyl, aryl, and acyl substituted cyclopropanes via organometallic reactions.

== See also ==
- Iodoalkanes
