= Nufenoxole =

Chemical compound

Identifiers
- IUPAC name: 2-[3-(2-azabicyclo[2.2.2]octan-2-yl)-1,1-diphenylpropyl]-5-methyl-1,3,4-oxadiazole
- CAS Number: 57726-65-5
- PubChem CID: 42551
- ChemSpider: 38808
- UNII: 39ER7N857V
- KEGG: D05211
- ChEMBL: ChEMBL3989894
- CompTox Dashboard (EPA): DTXSID80206427

Chemical and physical data
- Formula: C_{25}H_{29}N_{3}O
- Molar mass: 387.527 g·mol^{−1}
- 3D model (JSmol): Interactive image
- SMILES: CC1=NN=C(O1)C(CCN2CC3CCC2CC3)(C4=CC=CC=C4)C5=CC=CC=C5
- InChI: InChI=1S/C25H29N3O/c1-19-26-27-24(29-19)25(21-8-4-2-5-9-21,22-10-6-3-7-11-22)16-17-28-18-20-12-14-23(28)15-13-20/h2-11,20,23H,12-18H2,1H3; Key:CVOCKGAVXLCEGM-UHFFFAOYSA-N

Nufenoxole (SC-27166) is an antidiarrhoeal drug which acts as a peripherally selective opioid agonist, in a similar manner to loperamide. while it is able to activate μ-opioid receptors, it fails to cross the blood–brain barrier and so has a selective action against diarrhoea without producing analgesic effects.

== See also ==
- Dipipanone
- Dipyanone
- Desmethylmoramide
