= Bromobenzyl cyanide =

Phased out persisting lachrymatory agent

Names
- IUPAC name (RS)-2-bromo-2-phenylacetonitrile
- Other names α-bromobenzyl cyanide

Identifiers
CAS Number	5798-79-8
3D model (JSmol)	Interactive image
ChemSpider	20715
ECHA InfoCard	100.024.863
PubChem CID	22044
UNII	7JP1R2F6C6
CompTox Dashboard (EPA)	DTXSID50871146
- InChI: InChI=1S/C8H6BrN/c9-8(6-10)7-4-2-1-3-5-7/h1-5,8H Key: XUHFBOUSHUEAQZ-UHFFFAOYSA-N; InChI=1/C8H6BrN/c9-8(6-10)7-4-2-1-3-5-7/h1-5,8H Key: XUHFBOUSHUEAQZ-UHFFFAOYAJ
- SMILES: C1=CC=C(C=C1)C(C#N)Br

Properties
Chemical formula	C_{8}H_{6}BrN
Molar mass	196.04 g mol^{−1}
Appearance	Pale yellow crystals
Odor	odor of soured fruit
Density	1.539 g/cm^{3}
Melting point	29 °C (84 °F; 302 K)
Boiling point	242 °C (468 °F; 515 K)
Solubility in water	slightly soluble
Solubility	freely soluble in alcohol, ether, acetone, and chloroform soluble in phosgene, chloropicrin and benzyl cyanide
Vapor pressure	0.012 mmHg (20 °C)

Hazards
- GHS labelling
Pictograms	(GHS07: Exclamation mark)
Signal word	Warning
Hazard statements	H302, H315, H319, H335
Precautionary statements	P261, P264, P264+P265, P270, P271, P280, P301+P317, P302+P352, P304+P340, P305+P351+P338, P319, P321, P330, P332+P317, P337+P317, P362+P364, P403+P233, P405, P501
- Except where otherwise noted, data are given for materials in their standard state (at 25 °C [77 °F], 100 kPa). verify (what is ?) Infobox references

Bromobenzyl cyanide (BBC), also known in the military idiom as camite, is an obsolete lachrymatory agent introduced in World War I by the Allied Powers, being a standard agent, along with chloroacetophenone, adopted by the Chemical Warfare Service. It was thought to have been phased out in the 1930s, but has allegedly seen use in 2024, when authorities in the Republic of Georgia are said to have used it to quell anti-government protests.

When implemented in World War I, it revolutionized the use of tear agents due to its extreme potency and great persistence. Bromobenzyl cyanide has been described as too toxic for use as a non-lethal crowd control agent.

== Use against protestors in 2024 ==
Despite it being described as obsolete, Georgian authorities appeared to have used camite in November 2024 against civil protestors in Tbilisi, adding it to the water in a water cannon aimed at the people, according to a BBC News investigation.

== Applications ==
An application for bromobenzyl cyanide is in Hoch's synthesis of diphenylacetonitrile.

== See also ==
- Chloroacetophenone
- CR gas
- CS gas
- Lachrymatory agent
