= Bromocyclopropane =

Names
- Preferred IUPAC name Bromocyclopropane
- Other names Cyclopropyl bromide, cyclopropylbromide

Identifiers
CAS Number	4333-56-6
3D model (JSmol)	Interactive image
ChemSpider	70418
ECHA InfoCard	100.022.160
EC Number	224-375-7
PubChem CID	78037
CompTox Dashboard (EPA)	DTXSID8063418
- InChI: InChI=1S/C3H5Br/c4-3-1-2-3/h3H,1-2H2 Key: LKXYJYDRLBPHRS-UHFFFAOYSA-N
- SMILES: C1CC1Br

Properties
Chemical formula	C_{3}H_{5}Br
Molar mass	120.977 g·mol^{−1}
Appearance	liquid
Density	1.515 g/cm^{3}
Boiling point	68–70 °C (154–158 °F; 341–343 K)
Solubility in water	Insoluble

Hazards
- GHS labelling
Pictograms	(GHS02: Flammable) (GHS07: Exclamation mark)
Signal word	Danger
Hazard statements	H225, H315, H319, H335
Precautionary statements	P210, P233, P240, P241, P242, P243, P261, P264, P264+P265, P271, P280, P302+P352, P303+P361+P353, P304+P340, P305+P351+P338, P319, P321, P332+P317, P337+P317, P362+P364, P370+P378, P403+P233, P403+P235, P405, P501

Related compounds
Related compounds	Chlorocyclopropane; Fluorocyclopropane; Iodocyclopropane; Bromocyclobutane; Bromocyclopentane
- Except where otherwise noted, data are given for materials in their standard state (at 25 °C [77 °F], 100 kPa). Infobox references

Bromocyclopropane is a organobromine compound with the chemical formula C_{3}H_{5}Br. It is a member of haloalkane family.

== Synthesis ==
The compound can be obtained by treating silver cyclopropanecarboxylate with bromine:

C_{3}H_{5}CO_{2}Ag + Br_{2} → C_{3}H_{5}Br + AgBr + CO_{2}

== Chemical properties ==
Reaction with magnesium, using diethyl ether as solvent, only gives about 25–30% of the cyclopropylmagnesium bromide Grignard reagent, with nearly as much cyclopropane formed by alternate reactions on the metal surface.

The compound isomerizes on heating to produce 1-bromopropene and 3-bromopropene.

== Physical properties ==
The compound is a flammable liquid that causes skin irritation and serious eye irritation. It is soluble in chloroform and methanol. Insoluble in water.

== See also ==
- Bromoalkanes
- Bromocyclohexane
