= Aminopentamide =

Antispasmodic drug

Clinical data
- Other names: Dimevamide, Centrine.

Identifiers
- IUPAC name: 4-(dimethylamino)-2,2-diphenylpentanamide
- CAS Number: 60-46-8
- PubChem CID: 22565
- DrugBank: DB15597
- ChemSpider: 21159
- UNII: IP1B47L61M
- ChEMBL: ChEMBL92915
- CompTox Dashboard (EPA): DTXSID2057605
- ECHA InfoCard: 100.000.436

Chemical and physical data
- Formula: C_{19}H_{24}N_{2}O
- Molar mass: 296.414 g·mol^{−1}
- 3D model (JSmol): Interactive image
- SMILES: CC(CC(C1=CC=CC=C1)(C2=CC=CC=C2)C(=O)N)N(C)C
- InChI: InChI=1S/C19H24N2O/c1-15(21(2)3)14-19(18(20)22,16-10-6-4-7-11-16)17-12-8-5-9-13-17/h4-13,15H,14H2,1-3H3,(H2,20,22); Key:NARHAGIVSFTMIG-UHFFFAOYSA-N

Aminopentamide is an anticholinergic antispasmodic and antidiarrheal drug and also a bird and rodent repellent. It is structurally related to Darifenacin.

It is used to treat vomiting, diarrhea, gastrointestinal pain and spasms in cats and dogs. The commercially available drug named Centrine contains aminopentamide bisulfate.

== Medical uses ==
Aminopentamide is used to alleviate vomiting and diarrhea by reducing gastric motility, decreasing gastric acid secretion, and lowering gastric acidity. It is also effective against visceral spasms and pylorospasm in dogs and cats due to its antispasmodic properties.

== Side effects ==
Aminopentamide may cause mild anticholinergic side effects such as dry mouth or urinary retention. At very high doses, it can produce mydriasis and hyposalivation, though these effects are less pronounced than with atropine.

== Pharmacology ==
Aminopentamide is a synthetic anticholinergic agent that acts as a nonselective muscarinic receptor antagonist, primarily targeting smooth muscle in the gastrointestinal tract. It reduces gastric motility, decreases gastric acid secretion, and lowers gastric acidity. Compared to atropine, aminopentamide demonstrates stronger and longer-lasting suppression of colonic contraction amplitude and tone while causing fewer systemic side effects like mydriasis or excessive salivary inhibition. It acts by blocking cholinergic transmission at parasympathetic nerve endings. Aminopentamide has half the potency of atropine and one-fifth the potency of papaverine. It has similar bioavailability when taken orally, intramuscularly, or intravenously. It is more suitable for decreasing the activity of the colon than atropine or banthine, being more effective and longer-lasting.

== Chemistry ==
The synthesis is the same as for methadone except for the last step where the nitrile called 2,2-diphenyl-4-dimethylaminovaleronitrile is partially hydrolyzed into an amide instead of being converted to a ketone.

== History ==
Aminopentamide was discovered by Bristol Laboratories and was patented in 1953. Its pharmacological activity was reported on a year later by Hoekstra et al.

Another patent from 1975 claims an anesthetic mixture for cats that contains aminopentamide along with ketamine, which supposedly alleviates some of the side-effects of ketamine.

== See also ==
- Vamicamide
