= Etaminile =

Abandoned antitussive

Clinical data
- Other names: OM-977
- Drug class: Antitussive

Identifiers
- IUPAC name: 4-(dimethylamino)-2-ethyl-2-phenylpentanenitrile
- CAS Number: 15599-27-6
- PubChem CID: 208936
- ChemSpider: 181031
- UNII: R3TGX0K69Z
- ChEMBL: ChEMBL2104277
- CompTox Dashboard (EPA): DTXSID00864604

Chemical and physical data
- Formula: C_{15}H_{22}N_{2}
- Molar mass: 230.355 g·mol^{−1}
- 3D model (JSmol): Interactive image
- SMILES: CCC(CC(C)N(C)C)(C#N)C1=CC=CC=C1
- InChI: InChI=1S/C15H22N2/c1-5-15(12-16,11-13(2)17(3)4)14-9-7-6-8-10-14/h6-10,13H,5,11H2,1-4H3; Key:CNKVQTMWLAZAPL-UHFFFAOYSA-N

Etaminile (INN; developmental code name OM-977) is a drug described as an antitussive (cough suppressant) which was never marketed. It was first described in the literature by 1963.
