= Heyneanine =

Names
- IUPAC name (1S)-1-[(1R,15R,17R,18R)-3,13-diazapentacyclo[13.3.1.02,10.04,9.013,18]nonadeca-2(10),4,6,8-tetraen-17-yl]ethanol

Identifiers
CAS Number	4865-78-5
3D model (JSmol)	Interactive image
ChEMBL	ChEMBL461609
ChemSpider	10207461
PubChem CID	44566758
- InChI: InChI=1S/C19H24N2O/c1-11(22)15-8-12-9-16-18-14(6-7-21(10-12)19(15)16)13-4-2-3-5-17(13)20-18/h2-5,11-12,15-16,19-20,22H,6-10H2,1H3/t11-,12-,15-,16-,19-/m0/s1 Key: TVPHSOXWTLOHCG-CCISYGEFSA-N
- SMILES: C[C@@H]([C@@H]1C[C@H]2C[C@@H]3[C@H]1N(C2)CCC4=C3NC5=CC=CC=C45)O

Properties
Chemical formula	C_{21}H_{26}N_{2}O_{3}
Molar mass	354.450 g·mol^{−1}
- Except where otherwise noted, data are given for materials in their standard state (at 25 °C [77 °F], 100 kPa). Infobox references

Heyneanine is a Tabernaemontana alkaloid with in vitro antitumor activity. It also inhibits butrylcholinesterase.

== See also ==
- Coronaridine
- Voacangine
