= Acetergamine =

Names
- Systematic IUPAC name N-{[(8β)-6-Methylergolin-8-yl]methyl}acetamide
- Other names 8β-acetylaminomethyl-6-methylergoline (+)-N-Acetyl-9,10-dihydrolysergamine

Identifiers
CAS Number	3031-48-9
3D model (JSmol)	Interactive image
ChemSpider	64269
ECHA InfoCard	100.019.281
PubChem CID	71118
UNII	O60O0JB93O
CompTox Dashboard (EPA)	DTXSID201043382
- InChI: InChI=1S/C18H23N3O/c1-11(22)19-8-12-6-15-14-4-3-5-16-18(14)13(9-20-16)7-17(15)21(2)10-12/h3-5,9,12,15,17,20H,6-8,10H2,1-2H3,(H,19,22)/t12-,15+,17+/m0/s1 Key: SGZVEWGAZGOWGP-XGWLTEMNSA-N
- SMILES: O=C(NC[C@@H]2C[C@@H]3c4cccc1c4c(c[nH]1)C[C@H]3N(C2)C)C

Properties
Chemical formula	C_{18}H_{23}N_{3}O
Molar mass	297.402 g·mol^{−1}
- Except where otherwise noted, data are given for materials in their standard state (at 25 °C [77 °F], 100 kPa). Infobox references

Acetergamine is an organic chemical compound; specifically it is a derivative of ergoline, making it a member of the ergotamine family of compounds. Acetergamine currently has no mainstream uses, however its potential as an alpha-1 blocker and vasodilator has led to it being covered in several patents concerning therapies for erectile dysfunction. It has also been investigated as a treatment for cerebellar ataxia.

== See also ==
- Substituted ergoline
