= Blixeprodil =

Clinical data
- Other names: GM-1020; GM1020; (R)-4-Fluorodeschloroketamine; (R)-4-FDCK; (R)-4FDCK
- Routes of administration: Oral
- Drug class: NMDA receptor antagonist

Pharmacokinetic data
- Bioavailability: >60%
- Elimination half-life: 4.3 hours

Identifiers
- IUPAC name: (2R)-2-(4-fluorophenyl)-2-(methylamino)cyclohexan-1-one
- CAS Number: 2881017-49-6
- PubChem CID: 156552274
- UNII: S2MGG2PC5K

Chemical and physical data
- Formula: C_{13}H_{16}FNO
- Molar mass: 221.275 g·mol^{−1}
- 3D model (JSmol): Interactive image
- SMILES: CN[C@]1(CCCCC1=O)C2=CC=C(C=C2)F
- InChI: InChI=1S/C13H16FNO/c1-15-13(9-3-2-4-12(13)16)10-5-7-11(14)8-6-10/h5-8,15H,2-4,9H2,1H3/t13-/m1/s1; Key:GLHWPYBETIKGHM-CYBMUJFWSA-N

Blixeprodil (INN), also known by its developmental code name GM-1020 or as (R)-4-fluorodeschloroketamine ((R)-4-FDCK), is an NMDA receptor antagonist related to ketamine which is under development for the treatment of major depressive disorder, bipolar depression, and other depressive disorders. It is taken orally.

== Use and effects ==
In a clinical study comparing blixeprodil with the serotonergic psychedelic bretisilocin (GM-2505), both drugs produced hallucinogenic effects. Blixeprodil was evaluated at doses of 20 to 360 mg orally.

== Pharmacology ==
=== Pharmacodynamics ===
Blixeprodil acts as an non-competitive NMDA receptor antagonist (K_{i} = 3,250 nM) and is a close analogue of ketamine. It shows antidepressant-like effects in rodents. The drug appears to have a greater separation between antidepressant-like and ataxia-inducing doses than ketamine in rodents and hence might have better tolerability in humans. Whereas ketamine shows only 3-fold separation between antidepressant-like and ataxic doses, there was 13-fold separation for blixeprodil. In addition, blixeprodil did not produce hyperlocomotion at doses greater than 20-fold higher than the minimum antidepressant-like dose. In relation to the preceding, blixeprodil is claimed to be non-dissociative at therapeutic doses. However, dissociative and other related effects have been observed at low incidences and at higher doses.

=== Pharmacokinetics ===
Blixeprodil is orally active, in contrast to the poor oral bioavailability of ketamine. Its oral bioavailability is >60%. The time to peak levels of blixeprodil is 1.5 hours and its elimination half-life is 4.3 hours.

== Chemistry ==
Blixeprodil is a close analogue of ketamine, with a 4-fluoro group instead of a 2-chloro group on the phenyl ring and in (2R)-enantiopure form. Hence, it is related to arketamine ((R)-ketamine), and is said to "bet" on the notion that arketamine is importantly involved in the antidepressant effects of ketamine, in spite of arketamine having less propensity for inducing dissociation.

== Development ==
Blixeprodil is being developed by Gilgamesh Pharmaceuticals. As of July 2024, it was in phase 2 clinical trials for major depressive disorder and bipolar depression and is in phase 1 trials for other depressive disorders. In January 2026, Gilgamesh Pharmaceuticals announced positive topline results from its phase 2a study of blixeprodil in major depressive disorder. In April 2026, blixeprodil was listed as being under development only for major depressive disorder, with its status for this indication continuing to be phase 2 trials.

== See also ==
- List of investigational antidepressants
- List of investigational hallucinogens and entactogens
- 2-Fluorodeschloroketamine
- 3-Fluorodeschloroketamine
- Fluorexetamine
