= Eburnamine =

Names
- IUPAC name 14,15-Dihydroeburnamenin-14β-ol
- Systematic IUPAC name (4^{1}R,12R,13aR)-13a-Ethyl-2,3,4^{1},5,6,12,13,13a-octahydro-1H-indolo[3,2,1-de]pyrido[3,2,1-ij][1,5]naphthyridin-12-ol
- Other names (14β)-14,15-Dihydroeburnamenin-14-ol

Identifiers
CAS Number	4201-84-7
3D model (JSmol)	Interactive image
ChemSpider	91888
PubChem CID	101699
UNII	8TX88E57UY
CompTox Dashboard (EPA)	DTXSID201336068 DTXSID00194817, DTXSID201336068
- InChI: InChI=1S/C19H24N2O/c1-2-19-9-5-10-20-11-8-14-13-6-3-4-7-15(13)21(16(22)12-19)17(14)18(19)20/h3-4,6-7,16,18,22H,2,5,8-12H2,1H3/t16-,18+,19-/m1/s1 Key: HONLKDDLTAZVQV-NZSAHSFTSA-N; InChI=1/C19H24N2O/c1-2-19-9-5-10-20-11-8-14-13-6-3-4-7-15(13)21(16(22)12-19)17(14)18(19)20/h3-4,6-7,16,18,22H,2,5,8-12H2,1H3/t16-,18+,19-/m1/s1 Key: HONLKDDLTAZVQV-NZSAHSFTBX
- SMILES: CC[C@]12CCCN3[C@H]1C4=C(CC3)C5=CC=CC=C5N4[C@@H](C2)O

Properties
Chemical formula	C_{19}H_{24}N_{2}O
Molar mass	296.407
- Except where otherwise noted, data are given for materials in their standard state (at 25 °C [77 °F], 100 kPa). Infobox references

Eburnamine is an indole alkaloid in the aspidosperma group. It has anticholinergic activity.
