= Clemeprol =

Antidepressant drug

Clinical data
- Other names: BRL 14342

Identifiers
- IUPAC name: 1-(3-chlorophenyl)-3-(dimethylamino)-1-phenylpropan-2-ol
- CAS Number: 71827-56-0
- PubChem CID: 10108256
- ChemSpider: 64987
- UNII: R3TC4SEW5A
- ChEMBL: ChEMBL2106077
- CompTox Dashboard (EPA): DTXSID90868035

Chemical and physical data
- Formula: C_{17}H_{20}ClNO
- Molar mass: 289.80 g·mol^{−1}
- 3D model (JSmol): Interactive image
- SMILES: CN(C)CC(C(C1=CC=CC=C1)C2=CC(=CC=C2)Cl)O
- InChI: InChI=InChI=1S/C17H20ClNO/c1-19(2)12-16(20)17(13-7-4-3-5-8-13)14-9-6-10-15(18)11-14/h3-11,16-17,20H,12H2,1-2H3; Key:KGSABFQIAANNPS-UHFFFAOYSA-N

Clemeprol is an serotonin–norepinephrine reuptake inhibitor (SNRI) antidepressant and anticholinergic agent.

It is an enantiomeric mixture of R and S isomers. Both isomers show similar pharmacological activity.

== Synthesis ==
=== Published Procedure ===
A synthetic pathway for clemeprol is disclosed:

Clemeprol synthesis

The Johnson–Corey–Chaykovsky reaction (CCR) between 3-chlorobenzophenone [1016-78-0] (1) and dimethylsulfoxonium methylide (aka Corey's reagent or Corey-Chaykovsky Reagent) [5367-24-8], gives 2-(3-chlorophenyl)-2-phenyloxirane [71827-53-7] (2). Further reaction with boron trifluoride etherate [109-63-7] gives m-chlorophenyl-phenylacetaldehyde, PC12549135 (3). A second Corey-Chaykovsky epoxidation gives 2-[(3-chlorophenyl)-phenylmethyl]oxirane, PC12549073 (4). Quenching with dimethylamine completes the synthesis of clemeprol (5).

=== Hypothetical Synthesis ===
A hypothetical synthesis of clemeprol based on method A in the cited literature is disclosed.

Clemeprol synthesis (hypothetical)

The precursor is called 2-(3-Chlorophenyl)-2-phenylacetonitrile (1). This would be prepared using methodology that was described already under the diphenylacetonitrile document. A Grignard reaction with one equivalent of methylmagnesium bromide leads to a FGI of the nitrile to the acetyl compound (2). The alpha-bromination of the acetyl group with one equivalent of a halogenating agent (either molecular bromine/HOAc or NBS can be used) gives (3). The bromide leaving group is displaced by dimethylamine giving (4). Sodium borohydride can then be used as the reducing agent to convert the keto carbonyl group into a secondary alcohol, completing the synthesis of clemeprol (5).

== See also ==
- BRL15572 [734517-40-9]
