= A-NK =

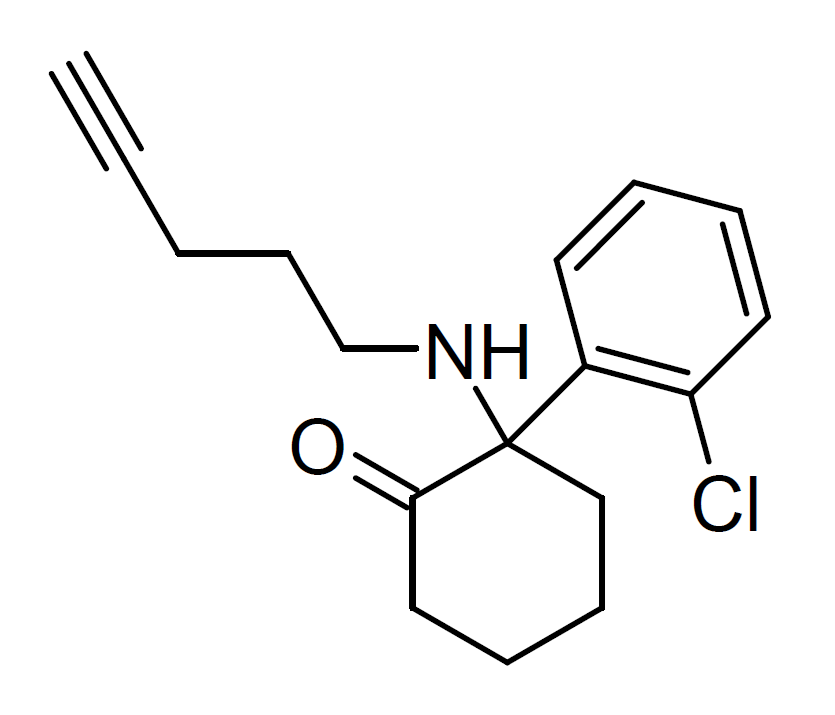

Identifiers
- IUPAC name: 2-(pent-4-ynylamino)-2-(2-chlorophenyl)cyclohexan-1-one

Chemical and physical data
- Formula: C_{17}H_{20}ClNO
- Molar mass: 289.80 g·mol^{−1}
- 3D model (JSmol): Interactive image
- SMILES: O=C1CCCCC1(NCCCC#C)c1ccccc1Cl
- InChI: InChI=1S/C17H20ClNO/c1-2-3-8-13-19-17(12-7-6-11-16(17)20)14-9-4-5-10-15(14)18/h1,4-5,9-10,19H,3,6-8,11-13H2; Key:NHILBAQTYWELDI-UHFFFAOYSA-N

A-NK, or alkyne-norketamine, is a designer drug from the arylcyclohexylamine family. It is derived from norketamine, a major metabolite of ketamine. It acts as a non-competitive NMDA antagonist, with comparable effects to ketamine.

== Pharmacology ==
=== Pharmacodynamics ===
A-NK acts as an antagonist at the PCP site of NMDA receptors. The effects depend on the presence of a protonable nitrogen atom, with A-NK-amide showing substantially lower activity at NMDA receptors. The potency of A-NK at NMDA receptors has been shown to be roughly 4 times lower than ketamine.

== See also ==
- 2-FXPr
- SN 35210
