= Bromocyclobutane =

Names
- Other names Cyclobutyl bromide

Identifiers
CAS Number	4399-47-7
3D model (JSmol)	Interactive image
ChemSpider	70487
ECHA InfoCard	100.022.302
EC Number	224-530-9
PubChem CID	78110
UNII	R2WW7AXM8T
CompTox Dashboard (EPA)	DTXSID20196010
- InChI: InChI=1S/C4H7Br/c5-4-2-1-3-4/h4H,1-3H2 Key: KXVUSQIDCZRUKF-UHFFFAOYSA-N
- SMILES: C1CC(C1)Br

Properties
Chemical formula	C_{4}H_{7}Br
Molar mass	135.004 g·mol^{−1}
Density	1.3719
Boiling point	103–104 °C (217–219 °F; 376–377 K)

Related compounds
Related compounds	bromocyclopropane; Bromocyclopentane; Fluorocyclobutane; Chlorocyclobutane; Iodocyclobutane; 1,1-Dibromocyclobutane; cis/trans 1,2-Dibromocyclobutane; cis/trans 1,3-Dibromocyclobutane
- Except where otherwise noted, data are given for materials in their standard state (at 25 °C [77 °F], 100 kPa). Infobox references

Cyclobutyl bromide or bromocyclobutane is an organic compound containing a cyclobutane ring with one hydrogen atom replaced by bromine. The formula is C_{4}H_{7}Br.

== Production ==
Cyclobutyl bromide can be produced from cyclobutane carboxylic acid in a reaction with bromine in the presence of mercuric oxide. It can be made from silver cyclobutane carboxylate and bromine.

It can be made from cyclopropylmethanol, in a reaction with hydrogen bromide (HBr).

Cyclobutanol can react with HBr to yield cyclobutyl bromide.

Bromination of cyanocyclobutane produces a small amount of bromocyclobutane. In addition to the dominant product, 1-bromo-1-cyanocyclobutane.

== Properties ==
The lengths of the bonds in the bromocyclobutane molecule are as follows: C_{α} is carbon atom in position 1 adjacent to bromine. C_{β} is the carbon in position 2 or 4 of the ring. C_{γ} is the carbon in position 3, opposite the bromine atom. Length C_{α}–C_{β} = 1.540 Å. Length C_{β}–C_{γ} = 1.548 Å. Length C_{α}–Br = 1.939 Å. The lengths of C–H = 1.096 Å, and C—D = 1.087 Å. The bond angles ∠ C_{β}C_{γ}C_{β} = 88.1°, ∠ C_{β}C_{α}C_{β} = 88.7°, HC_{γ}H = 110.7°, HC_{β}H = 108.7°, HC_{α}Br = 111°. The angle of C_{β}C_{α}C_{β} plane with C–Br is 131.0°, and the dihedral angle (angle made by the normals of the C_{β}C_{α}C_{β} and C_{β}C_{γ}C_{β} planes) is 29.35°.

There are two conformers based on the orientation of the bromine atom. The axial conformer comprises 3% of molecules, and the equatorial conformer comprises 97%. However there is a very low barrier to interconversion.

In the far-infrared spectrum there are Q-branch transitions at 143.0, 135.5, 129.2, and 124.0 cm^{-1}.

The LF Raman spectrum has lines at 149.0, 139.5, 134.8, 128.5, 124.0 cm^{−1}.

Refractive index N^{25}D is 1.4768. Boiling point is 106-108°C.

=== NMR spectrum ===
position	cis-trans	orientation	shift Hz
α		axial	4.441
β	trans	equatorial	2.597
β	cis	axial	2.465
γ	cis	equatorial	2.094
γ	trans	axial	1.873

== Reactions ==
When heated to temperatures between 791–1,224 K (518–951 °C) at low pressure, hydrogen bromide is eliminated producing cyclobutene.

When heated around 436°C, butadiene and hydrogen bromide are produced.

Cyclobutyl bromide reacts with magnesium in ether solution to yield the Grignard reagent C_{4}H_{7}MgBr.

234 nm UV light photodissociates cyclobutyl bromide to form a cyclobutyl radical and atomic bromine.

Hydrogenation of bromocyclobutane yields cyclobutane. Cyclobutyl bromide can be reduced by Bu_{3}SnH (or Bu_{3}SnD) to cyclobutane.

Diphenylphosphide reacts in liquid ammonia to displace bromide to form cyclobutyldiphenylphosphine.

Tributylstannyllithium reacts with cyclobutyl bromide to form tributyl(cyclobutyl)tin.

Electro-oxidation of bromocyclobutane dissolved in acetonitrile yields N-cyclobutylacetamide.

Sodium methanesulfinate reacts with cyclobutyl bromide to yield some methylsulfonylcyclobutane.

In Lucas reagent (ZnCl_{2} + HCl), cyclobutyl bromide forms the cyclobutyl cation (c-C_{4}H_{7}^{+}), which can rearrange or break the ring and then reform to yield cyclopropylcarbiny chloride (c-C_{3}H_{5}CH_{2}Cl) and allylcarbinyl chloride (CH_{2}=CHCH_{2}CH_{2}Cl).

Cyclobutyl bromide can do a carbon-carbon coupling to form 1,1'-bicyclobutyl c-C_{4}H_{7}-C_{4}H_{7}.

It is possible to substitute the bromine in bromocyclobutane with a trifluoromethyl, or trifluoroacetyl group under blue light.

== Extra reading ==
- Kelly, M.J.; Lielmezs, J. (September 1974). "Ideal gas state thermodynamic functions for monohalogenated cyclo-alkanes". Thermochimica Acta. 10 (1): 63–72. Bibcode:1974TcAc...10...63K. doi:10.1016/0040-6031(74)85024-0. calculated specific heat, entropy, free energy and enthalpy
