= 3-Fluorodeschloroketamine =

Chemical compound

Identifiers
- IUPAC name: 2-(3-Fluorophenyl)-2-methylamino-cyclohexanone
- CAS Number: 2657761-23-2
- PubChem CID: 156538475
- CompTox Dashboard (EPA): DTXSID001336917

Chemical and physical data
- Formula: C_{13}H_{16}FNO
- Molar mass: 221.275 g·mol^{−1}
- 3D model (JSmol): Interactive image
- SMILES: CNC1(CCCCC1=O)c1cccc(F)c1
- InChI: InChI=1S/C13H16FNO/c1-15-13(8-3-2-7-12(13)16)10-5-4-6-11(14)9-10/h4-6,9,15H,2-3,7-8H2,1H3; Key:SLRWGPTWJAJHDF-UHFFFAOYSA-N

3-Fluorodeschloroketamine (3F-DCK, 3-FDCK, FXM) is a recreational designer drug related to ketamine. It is from the arylcyclohexylamine family and has dissociative effects. It was made illegal in Finland in August 2019.

== See also ==
- 2-Fluorodeschloroketamine
- 3-Fluoro-PCP
- Blixeprodil
- Deschloroketamine
- Fluorexetamine
- Methoxmetamine
