= Vamicamide =

Clinical data
- Other names: Urocut, FK-176

Legal status
- Legal status: Investigational

Identifiers
- IUPAC name: (2R,4R)-4-(dimethylamino)-2-phenyl-2-pyridin-2-ylpentanamide
- CAS Number: 132373-81-0
- PubChem CID: 65967
- ChemSpider: 59369
- UNII: RU10K34QRU
- ChEMBL: ChEMBL2114366

Chemical and physical data
- Formula: C_{18}H_{23}N_{3}O
- Molar mass: 297.402 g·mol^{−1}
- 3D model (JSmol): Interactive image
- SMILES: C[C@H](C[C@@](C1=CC=CC=C1)(C2=CC=CC=N2)C(=O)N)N(C)C
- InChI: InChI=1S/C18H23N3O/c1-14(21(2)3)13-18(17(19)22,15-9-5-4-6-10-15)16-11-7-8-12-20-16/h4-12,14H,13H2,1-3H3,(H2,19,22)/t14-,18-/m1/s1; Key:BWNLUIXQIHPUGO-RDTXWAMCSA-N

Vamicamide, also known as FK-176 or Urocut, is a muscarinic acetylcholine receptor (mAChR) antagonist that was developed by Fujisawa (now part of Astellas Pharma) for the treatment of urinary incontinence and overactive bladder. This small molecule drug acts by blocking muscarinic receptors, which play a role in bladder function. Despite showing promise in preclinical studies for increasing bladder capacity without affecting other urinary parameters, vamicamide has never been approved for medical use. The drug's development was ultimately discontinued, with its highest research and development status reaching the New Drug Application (NDA) phase in Japan.
