= Diphepanol =

Names
- IUPAC name 1,1-diphenyl-2-(piperidin-1-yl)propan-1-ol

Identifiers
CAS Number	510-07-6
3D model (JSmol)	Interactive image
ChemSpider	84978
ECHA InfoCard	100.007.372
PubChem CID	94161
UNII	V4WZF2T3Y5
CompTox Dashboard (EPA)	DTXSID70965273
- InChI: InChI=1S/C20H25NO/c1-17(21-15-9-4-10-16-21)20(22,18-11-5-2-6-12-18)19-13-7-3-8-14-19/h2-3,5-8,11-14,17,22H,4,9-10,15-16H2,1H3
- SMILES: OC(c1ccccc1)(c2ccccc2)C(N3CCCCC3)C

Properties
Chemical formula	C_{20}H_{25}NO
Molar mass	295.42
- Except where otherwise noted, data are given for materials in their standard state (at 25 °C [77 °F], 100 kPa). Infobox references

Diphepanol is a cough suppressant (antitussive).

== Synthesis ==
Synthesis: Patent:

Ex 1: The α-keto bromination of propiophenone [93-55-0] (1) gives 2-bromopropiophenone [2114-00-3] (2). Displacement of the halogen and hence amination with piperidine [110-89-4] gave alpha-Piperidinopropiophenone, CID:458526 (3). and addition of phenyl Grignard reagent to give the benzhydrol product, and hence Dihepanol (4).

== See also ==
- Diphenidol
- Clofedanol
