= Feclemine =

Spasmolytic drug

Clinical data
- Other names: Fenetamin; Giacosil; Licabile; Licaran; Phenecyclamine; Phenetamine; Spasmexan; UCB-1545

Identifiers
- IUPAC name: 2-[Cyclohexyl(phenyl)methyl]-N,N,N',N'-tetraethylpropane-1,3-diamine
- CAS Number: 3590-16-7
- PubChem CID: 3030835
- ChemSpider: 2295996
- UNII: 5P7U986QGO
- ChEBI: CHEBI:135518
- ChEMBL: ChEMBL2106137
- PDB ligand: PD072576 (PDBe, RCSB PDB)
- CompTox Dashboard (EPA): DTXSID80863211

Chemical and physical data
- Formula: C_{24}H_{42}N_{2}
- Molar mass: 358.614 g·mol^{−1}
- 3D model (JSmol): Interactive image
- SMILES: CCN(CC)CC(CN(CC)CC)C(C1CCCCC1)C2=CC=CC=C2
- InChI: InChI=1S/C24H42N2/c1-5-25(6-2)19-23(20-26(7-3)8-4)24(21-15-11-9-12-16-21)22-17-13-10-14-18-22/h9,11-12,15-16,22-24H,5-8,10,13-14,17-20H2,1-4H3; Key:QDMORDTWFMWOFA-UHFFFAOYSA-N

Feclemine (phenetamine) is a spasmolytic drug.

== Synthesis ==
The chemical synthesis is discussed:

Sodamide is used to alkylate cyclohexylphenylacetonitrile [3893-23-0] (1) (also used for drofenine) with 2-chloro-N,N,N',N'-tetraethylpropane-1,3-diamine [3492-54-4] (HCl: [94465-65-3]) to give (2). Some rearrangement is possible to give a mixture of regioisomers. Sodamide catalyzed cleavage of the nitrile group in a separate step then completes the synthesis of feclemine (3).

Precursor: Alcohol:
