= Methoxmetamine =

Chemical compound

Legal status
- Legal status: CA: Schedule I; DE: NpSG (Industrial and scientific use only); UK: Class B

Identifiers
- IUPAC name: 2-(3-Methoxyphenyl)-2-(methylamino)cyclohexanone
- CAS Number: 1781829-56-8
- PubChem CID: 117067863
- ChemSpider: 58939253
- UNII: U2B6L9JR4L
- CompTox Dashboard (EPA): DTXSID101045797

Chemical and physical data
- Formula: C_{14}H_{19}NO_{2}
- Molar mass: 233.311 g·mol^{−1}
- 3D model (JSmol): Interactive image
- SMILES: COC1=CC=CC(=C1)C2(CCCCC2=O)NC
- InChI: InChI=1S/C14H19NO2/c1-15-14(9-4-3-8-13(14)16)11-6-5-7-12(10-11)17-2/h5-7,10,15H,3-4,8-9H2,1-2H3; Key:ZGQWDAOLJNAADS-UHFFFAOYSA-N

Methoxmetamine (also known as 3-MeO-2'-Oxo-PCM, MXM and MMXE) is a dissociative anesthetic of the arylcyclohexylamine class that is closely related to methoxetamine and methoxyketamine, and has been sold online as a designer drug.
