= Phenadoxone =

Opioid analgesic drug

Clinical data
- ATC code: none

Legal status
- Legal status: AU: S9 (Prohibited substance); BR: Class A1 (Narcotic drugs); CA: Schedule I; DE: Anlage I (Authorized scientific use only); US: Schedule I

Identifiers
- IUPAC name: 6-Morpholin-4-yl-4,4-diphenylheptan-3-one
- CAS Number: 467-84-5
- PubChem CID: 10089
- ChemSpider: 9686
- UNII: 375W3TA42N
- KEGG: D12698
- CompTox Dashboard (EPA): DTXSID70861963
- ECHA InfoCard: 100.006.729

Chemical and physical data
- Formula: C_{23}H_{29}NO_{2}
- Molar mass: 351.490 g·mol^{−1}
- 3D model (JSmol): Interactive image
- Melting point: 75.5 °C (167.9 °F)
- SMILES: O=C(C(c1ccccc1)(c2ccccc2)CC(N3CCOCC3)C)CC
- InChI: InChI=1S/C23H29NO2/c1-3-22(25)23(20-10-6-4-7-11-20,21-12-8-5-9-13-21)18-19(2)24-14-16-26-17-15-24/h4-13,19H,3,14-18H2,1-2H3; Key:LOXCOAXRHYDLOW-UHFFFAOYSA-N

Phenadoxone (trade names Heptalgin, Morphidone, and Heptazone) is an opioid analgesic of the open chain class (methadone and relatives) invented in Germany by Hoechst in 1947. It is one of a handful of useful synthetic analgesics which were used in the United States for various lengths of time in the 20 or so years after the end of the Second World War but which were withdrawn from the market for various or no known reason and which now are mostly in Schedule I of the United States' Controlled Substances Act of 1970, or (like phenazocine and bezitramide) in Schedule II but not produced or marketed in the US. Others on this list are ketobemidone (Ketogin), dextromoramide (Dimorlin, Palfium and others), phenazocine (Narphen and Prinadol), dipipanone (Diconal, Pipadone and Wellconal), piminodine (Alvodine), propiram (Algeril), anileridine (Leritine) and alphaprodine (Nisentil).

Phenadoxone has a US DEA ACSCN of 9637 and has had a zero annual manufacturing quota under the Controlled Substances Act 1970. Its withdrawal from US distribution prior to the promulgation of said act is a large part of its Schedule I designation; it is, however, used as a legitimate medication in other countries and consumption is increasing worldwide as indicated below.

Phenadoxone is generally considered to be a strong opioid analgesic and is regulated in much the same way as morphine where it is used. The usual starting dose is 10–20 mg and it has a duration of analgesic effect of 1 to 4 hours. Phenadoxone is not used at this time for purposes other than pain relief.

Like its drug subcategory prototype methadone, phenadoxone can be used as the opioid analgesic in Brompton cocktail. Phenadoxone is most used at the current time in Denmark and various countries in eastern Europe.
