= Dipipanone =

Opioid analgesic drug

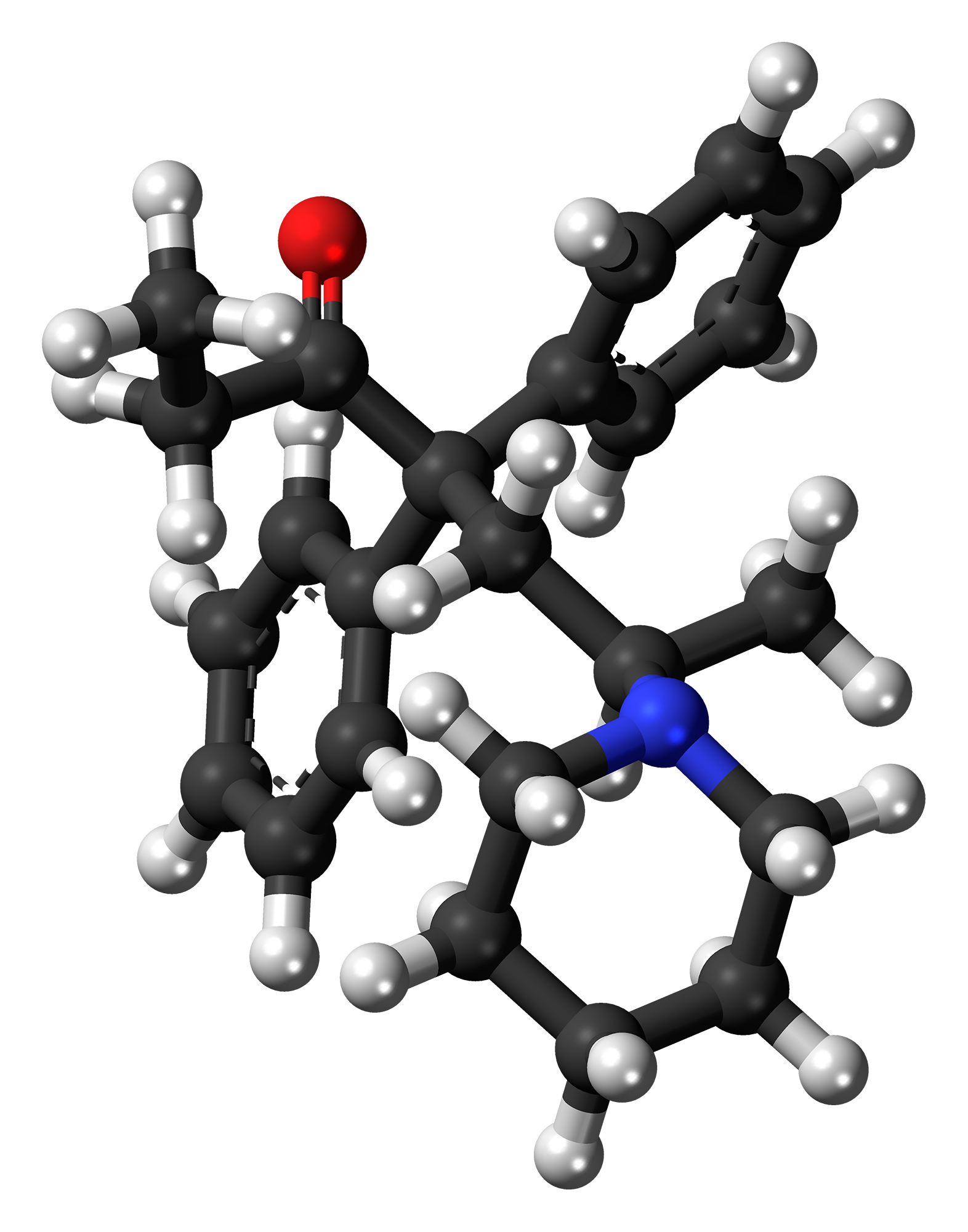

Clinical data
- Routes of administration: Oral
- ATC code: none

Legal status
- Legal status: AU: S8 (Controlled drug); BR: Class A1 (Narcotic drugs); CA: Schedule I; DE: Anlage I (Authorized scientific use only); UK: Class A; US: Schedule I

Pharmacokinetic data
- Metabolism: Liver
- Elimination half-life: 3.5 hours

Identifiers
- IUPAC name: 4,4-diphenyl-6-(1-piperidinyl)-heptan-3-one
- CAS Number: 467-83-4
- PubChem CID: 13331
- DrugBank: DB01491
- ChemSpider: 12766
- UNII: X188638Y2V
- KEGG: D12671
- CompTox Dashboard (EPA): DTXSID50894759
- ECHA InfoCard: 100.006.728

Chemical and physical data
- Formula: C_{24}H_{31}NO
- Molar mass: 349.518 g·mol^{−1}
- 3D model (JSmol): Interactive image
- SMILES: O=C(CC)C(C1=CC=CC=C1)(CC(C)N2CCCCC2)C3=CC=CC=C3
- InChI: InChI=1S/C24H31NO/c1-3-23(26)24(21-13-7-4-8-14-21,22-15-9-5-10-16-22)19-20(2)25-17-11-6-12-18-25/h4-5,7-10,13-16,20H,3,6,11-12,17-19H2,1-2H3; Key:SVDHSZFEQYXRDC-UHFFFAOYSA-N

Dipipanone, sold under the brand names of Pipadone and Diconal is a strong opioid analgesic drug, used for acute pain by mouth (PO) for adults. It is often used in instances where morphine is indicated but cannot be used due to the patient being allergic to morphine. In analgesic potency 25 mg dipipanone is approximately equivalent to 10 mg morphine.

== Dosage forms ==
The main preparation of the drug commercially available is mixed with cyclizine (Diconal, Wellconal) which has the advantage of reducing nausea, vomiting and histamine release associated with strong opioid therapy.

Dipipanone was also available as an oral mixture 10 mg/5 mL without the cyclizine during the 1970s–1980s in the United Kingdom. This form was rare and used normally only in drug trials and in specialist Diconal addiction clinics.

Dipipanone is now the only alternative opioid left to use in the UK that is of equal strength to morphine that can be prescribed instead, aside from oxycodone and hydromorphone which are typically the second and third-line alternative to pain relief when morphine is indicated but not tolerated. A fentanyl patch may also be used, especially in cases of renal impairment.

One of the limitations of using dipipanone is that it is only produced in one dosage form that is mixed with the anti-emetic and anti-histamine cyclizine at a ratio of 25% dipipanone to 75% cyclizine which limits the dose of dipipanone to an absolute maximum of 3 tablets per dose up to 4–6 times a day. This is a 10 mg dipipanone and 30 mg cyclizine formulation.

It is made by the following manufacturers:

- Dipipanone 10 mg / cyclizine 30 mg tablets (Phoenix Healthcare Distribution Ltd)
- Dipipanone 10 mg / cyclizine 30 mg tablets (Alliance Healthcare (Distribution) Ltd)
- Dipipanone 10 mg / cyclizine 30 mg tablets (Advanz Pharma)

All formulations contain the same dose, and differ only in manufacturer.

As of November 2011 Amdipharm stopped making the Diconal brand tablets for the UK due to undisclosed commercial reasons. However the product is listed as available on the manufacturer's website as of July 1, 2014. General practitioners are now advised to prescribe it as generic dipipanone/cyclizine tablets.

== Use ==
Dipipanone is now unavailable in most countries of the world either by laws prohibiting its medicinal use as in the United States or by falling out of production as more modern analgesics took its market share. Great Britain, Northern Ireland and South Africa are known to continue to use the substance but it is infrequently prescribed.

Dipipanone is a Schedule I controlled substance in the United States; it has been assigned the ACSCN of 9622 and since 2013 had an annual manufacturing quota of 5 grams.

== Chemistry ==
Chemically, dipipanone belongs to the class of opioids called the 4,4-diphenylheptane-3-ones. It closely resembles methadone, the only structural difference being the N,N-dimethyl moiety of methadone being replaced with a piperidine ring. Other related compounds with equivalent activity where the piperidine ring has been replaced by other groups, include the morpholine derivative phenadoxone, as well as the corresponding pyrrolidine derivative dipyanone. The synthesis is the same as for phenadoxone, with the exception that piperidine is used in lieu of morpholine. Related compounds with an isoquinuclidine ring such as nufenoxole are also known.

== Medical and recreational use ==
Prescription of dipipanone is discouraged apart from in exceptional circumstances, because of the perceived risk of abuse — the BNF marks the substance as "less suitable for prescribing" along with other older compounds such as pethidine and pentazocine with unusual abuse patterns. The combination with cyclizine leads to a very strong "rush" if the drug is injected, however the tablets contain insoluble binders which can lead to serious injury or death. During the late 1970s to early 1980s in the UK, many deaths were blamed on misuse of this preparation. As supplies became unavailable, opiate users would mix crushed methadone tablets with crushed cyclizine tablets, in an attempt to replicate the effect of Diconal. When taken orally as indicated for pain, the risk of addiction and euphoric potential is similar to that of morphine, The historical deaths linked to misuse of this drug may make this drug distasteful for prescribing doctors.
