= Drofenine =

Chemical compound

Identifiers
- IUPAC name: 2-(diethylamino)ethyl 2-cyclohexyl-2-phenylacetate
- CAS Number: 1679-76-1
- PubChem CID: 3166
- ChemSpider: 3054
- UNII: 4QWV355536
- ChEBI: CHEBI:93825
- ChEMBL: ChEMBL442444
- CompTox Dashboard (EPA): DTXSID0048472
- ECHA InfoCard: 100.114.553

Chemical and physical data
- Formula: C_{20}H_{31}NO_{2}
- Molar mass: 317.473 g·mol^{−1}
- 3D model (JSmol): Interactive image
- SMILES: CCN(CC)CCOC(=O)C(C1CCCCC1)C2=CC=CC=C2
- InChI: InChI=1S/C20H31NO2/c1-3-21(4-2)15-16-23-20(22)19(17-11-7-5-8-12-17)18-13-9-6-10-14-18/h5,7-8,11-12,18-19H,3-4,6,9-10,13-16H2,1-2H3; Key:AGJBLWCLQCKRJP-UHFFFAOYSA-N

Drofenine is an antimuscarinic antispasmodic drug used for relaxing smooth muscle, thereby treating conditions, such as: dysmenorrhea, and pain in the gastrointestinal tract, biliary passages, and urogenital tract. Drofenine is assumed to work by increasing the levels of the protein TRPV3.
