= Crotonase family =

Enoyl-CoA hydratase/isomerase family

Identifiers
- Symbol: ECH
- Pfam: PF00378
- InterPro: IPR001753
- PROSITE: PDOC00150
- SCOP2: 1dub / SCOPe / SUPFAM
- CDD: cd06558
Available protein structures:
- PDB: 1dubA:48-214 2dubE:48-214 1ey3B:48-214 1mj3A:48-214 1hzdD:90-259 1wdmA:18-190 1wdkB:18-190 1wdlB:18-190 1uiyA:10-180 2f6qB:116-287 1q52B:48-235 1q51B:48-235 1rjnA:48-235 1rjmA:48-235 1dciA:67-247 1wz8B:22-191 2a81A:11-180 2a7kF:11-180 1ef8B:15-183 1ef9A:15-183 1pjhA:20-200 1k39B:20-200 1hnoA:20-200 1hnuA:20-200 2fbmA:295-467 1szoC:27-195 1o8uD:27-195 1xx4A:45-215 1sg4C:58-228 IPR001753 PF00378 (ECOD; PDBsum)
- AlphaFold: IPR001753; PF00378

The crotonase family comprises mechanistically diverse proteins that share a conserved trimeric quaternary structure (sometimes a hexamer consisting of a dimer of trimers), the core of which consists of 4 turns of a (beta/beta/alpha)n superhelix.

Some enzymes in the superfamily have been shown to display dehalogenase, hydratase, and isomerase activities, while others have been implicated in carbon-carbon bond formation and cleavage as well as the hydrolysis of thioesters. However, these different enzymes share the need to stabilize an enolate anion intermediate derived from an acyl-CoA substrate. This is accomplished by two structurally conserved peptidic NH groups that provide hydrogen bonds to the carbonyl moieties of the acyl-CoA substrates and form an "oxyanion hole". The CoA thioester derivatives bind in a characteristic hooked shape and a conserved tunnel binds the pantetheine group of CoA, which links the 3'-phosphate ADP binding site to the site of reaction. Enzymes in the crotonase superfamily include:

- Enoyl-CoA hydratase (crotonase; EC 4.2.1.17), which catalyses the hydratation of 2-trans-enoyl-CoA into 3-hydroxyacyl-CoA.
- 3-2trans-enoyl-CoA isomerase (or dodecenoyl-CoA isomerise; EC 5.3.3.8), which shifts the 3-double bond of the intermediates of unsaturated fatty acid oxidation to the 2-trans position.
- 3-hydroxybutyryl-CoA dehydrogenase (crotonase; EC 4.2.1.55), a bacterial enzyme involved in the butyrate/butanol-producing pathway.
- 4-Chlorobenzoyl-CoA dehalogenase (EC 3.8.1.6), a Pseudomonas enzyme which catalyses the conversion of 4-chlorobenzoate-CoA to 4-hydroxybenzoate-CoA.
- Dienoyl-CoA isomerase, which catalyses the isomerisation of 3-trans,5-cis-dienoyl-CoA to 2-trans,4-trans-dienoyl-CoA.
- Naphthoate synthase (MenB, or DHNA synthetase; EC 4.1.3.36), a bacterial enzyme involved in the biosynthesis of menaquinone (vitamin K2).
- Carnitine racemase (gene caiD), which catalyses the reversible conversion of crotonobetaine to L-carnitine in Escherichia coli.
- Methylmalonyl CoA decarboxylase (MMCD; EC 4.1.1.41), which has a hexameric structure (dimer of trimers).
- Carboxymethylproline synthase (CarB), which is involved in carbapenem biosynthesis.
- 6-oxo camphor hydrolase, which catalyses the desymmetrization of bicyclic beta-diketones to optically active keto acids.
- The alpha subunit of fatty acid oxidation complex, a multi-enzyme complex that catalyses the last three reactions in the fatty acid beta-oxidation cycle.
- AUH protein, a bifunctional RNA-binding homologue of enoyl-CoA hydratase.

== Human proteins containing this domain ==
AUH; CDY2B; CDYL; CDYL2; DCI; ECH1; ECHDC1; ECHDC2; ECHDC3; ECHS1; EHHADH; HADHA; HCA64; HIBCH; PECI;
