= C6orf58 =

Protein-coding gene in the species Homo sapiens

Identifiers
- Aliases: C6orf58, LEG1, chromosome 6 open reading frame 58
- External IDs: MGI: 1914969; HomoloGene: 134042; GeneCards: C6orf58; OMA:C6orf58 - orthologs

Gene location (Human)
Chr.	Chromosome 6 (human)
Band	6q22.33	Start	127,519,455 bp
Band	6q22.33	End	127,591,820 bp

Gene location (Mouse)
Chr.	Chromosome 10 (mouse)
Band	10|10 A4	Start	28,848,284 bp
Band	10|10 A4	End	28,862,299 bp
RNA expression pattern
Bgee	Human / Mouse (ortholog); Top expressed in: trachea; pylorus; olfactory zone of nasal mucosa; minor salivary glands; testicle; cardia; duodenum; mucosa of pharynx; gonad; buccal mucosa cell / Top expressed in: parotid gland; lacrimal gland; olfactory epithelium; tongue; temporal muscle; masseter muscle; trachea; duodenum; cervix; embryo; More reference expression data
BioGPS	n/a
Orthologs
Species	Human	Mouse
Entrez	352999	67719
Ensembl	ENSG00000184530	ENSMUSG00000015519
UniProt	Q6P5S2	Q8C6C9
RefSeq (mRNA)	NM_001010905	NM_026336
RefSeq (protein)	NP_001010905	NP_080612
Location (UCSC)	Chr 6: 127.52 – 127.59 Mb	Chr 10: 28.85 – 28.86 Mb
PubMed search
- Wikidata
View/Edit Human	View/Edit Mouse

C6orf58 is a human gene located at locus 6q22.33 of chromosome 6 and encodes for UPF0762, a protein which is subsequently secreted after cleavage of a signal peptide. DUF781, which is the singular identifiable domain in UPF0762, is tied to liver development in an orthologous protein in zebrafish. The function of the human UPF0762 is not yet well characterized.

== Gene and mRNA ==
Genomic DNA Length (base pairs)	Exons	Mature mRNA Length (base pairs)	Splice variants	Signal peptide CDS (base pair)	Mature Peptide CDS (base pair)	5'-UTR (base pair)	3'-UTR (base pair)
14644	6	1200	3	13-72	73-1002	1-12	1003-1200

=== Expression ===
While there are 3 splice variants of C6orf58, only one encodes a good protein. In humans, C6orf58 expressed sequence tags were primarily detected in the larynx and trachea. Transcripts were only detected during the adult stage of development. Experimental microarray data, however, reveals additional regions of C6orf58 expression, namely in the salivary gland, thyroid, and small intestine. Arsenic may also regulate expression as it increases methylation of the C6orf58 promoter.

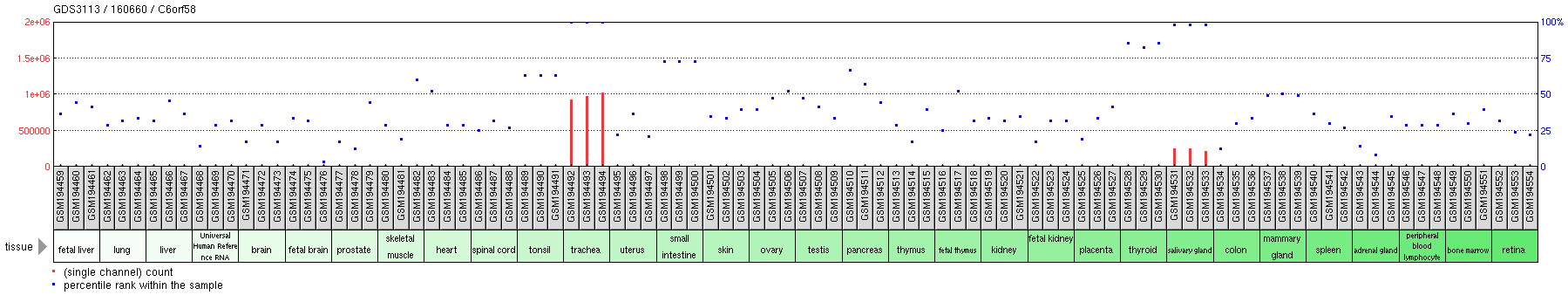
A microarray experiment of various tissues shows C6orf58 expression to be limited.

=== Gene Neighborhood ===
Genes within 500 Kilobases of C6orf58 include RSPO3, C6orf174, KIAA0408, RPL17P23, ECHDC1, RPL5P18, YWHAZP4, LOC100420743, LOC100421513, MRPS17P5, and THEMIS.

=== Homology ===
A selected set of homologous sequences are listed below, with sequence identity being calculated in comparison to the human reference sequence.

Species	Common name	Accession number	Sequence length (base pairs)	Sequence identity
Nomascus leucogenys	Northern white-cheeked gibbon	XM_003255689.1	1190	.97
Macaca mulatta	Rhesus monkey	NM_001194318.1	1190	.95
Oryctolagus cuniculus	European rabbit	XM_002714721.1	1014	.79
Loxodonta africana	African bush elephant	XM_003404026.1	1020	.78
Cavia porcellus	Guinea pig	XM_003468475.1	1017	.76
Equus caballus	Horse	XM_001917090.1	990	.77

== Protein ==
=== Properties ===
Amino acid length (amino acids)	Signal Peptide Length (amino acids)	Molecular Weight of Precursor Protein	Molecular Weight of Signal Peptide (Predicted)	Molecular Weight of Mature Peptide(predicted)	Molecular Weight(observed)	Isoelectric Point (Predicted)	N-linked glycosylation Site
330	20	37.9 kDa	2.1 kDa	35.8 kDa	32 kDa	5.78	Amino acid 69

Mass spectrometry has shown that the observed molecular weight of UPF0762 is 32kDa. It remains unclear why the observed molecular weight is less than predicted, even after accounting for cleavage of the signal peptide. Attachment of a sugar at the site of N-linked glycosylation would also increase the molecular weight.

=== Homology ===
UPF0762 shows high homology in primates and orthologous proteins can be traced back as far as trichoplax adhaerens. The list of proteins below is not a comprehensive listing of UPF0762 orthologs. Sequence identity and similarity were determined using BLAST with the reference human sequence as the query.

Species	Common name	Accession number	Sequence length (amino acids)	Sequence identity (%) ! !Sequence similarity (%)	
Pan troglodytes	Chimpanzee	XP_518733.2	330	1	1
Pongo abelii	Sumatran orangutan	XP_002817388.1	330	.98	.99
Callithrix jacchus	Marmoset	XP_002746989.1	330	.87	.93
Canis lupus	Gray wolf	XP_851589.1	310	.7	.82
Taeniopygia guttata	Zebra finch	XP_002190886.1	364	.43	.63
Gallus gallus	Red junglefowl	XP_419749.3	371	.42	.6
Xenopus tropicalis	Western clawed frog	XP_002940437.1	178	0.29	0.51
Trichoplax adhaerens	N/A	XP_002111384	381	.34	.49

=== Conserved domains ===
DUF781 is the singular domain of the protein and spans 318 of the protein's 330 amino acids. DUF781 has been linked to liver development in zebrafish.

=== Post-translational modifications ===
Observed post-translational modifications include N-linked glycosylation at amino acid 69. A signal peptide, which is predicted to direct the protein to the endoplasmic reticulum for secretion, is cleaved from the first 20 amino acids of the peptide sequence. The missense mutation S18F detected in hepatocellular carcinoma significantly reduces the predicted cleavage score of the signal peptide.

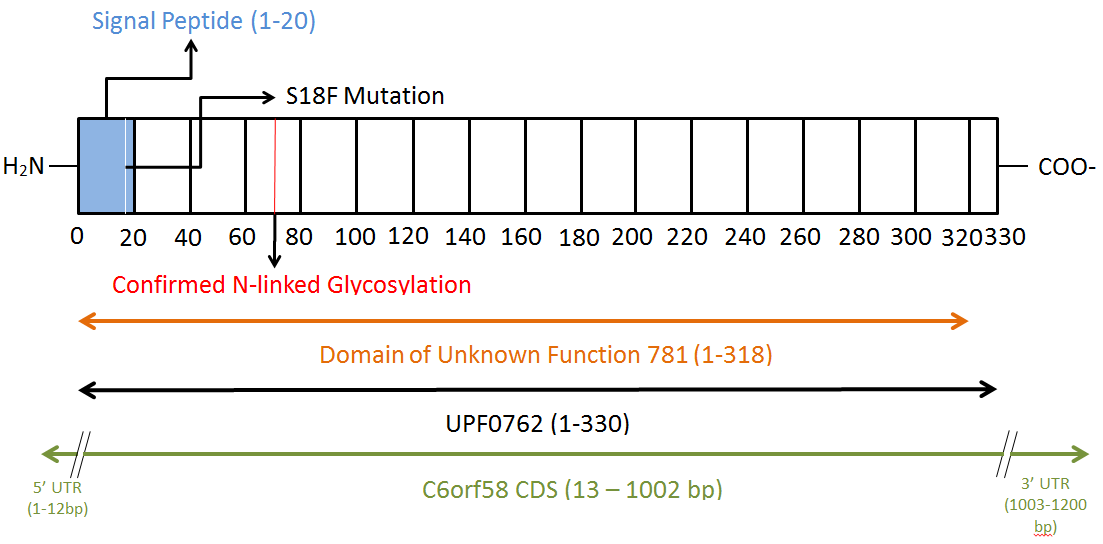
A graphical representation of UPF0762 showing various post-translational modifications.

=== Interactions ===
Human C6orf58 has been reported to interact with the enzyme ribonucleotide reductase as encoded by the vaccinia virus through a yeast two-hybrid screen.

== Pathology ==
Statistical analysis has shown C6orf58 to be associated with pancreatic cancer survival time. In addition, a missense mutation at amino acid 18 has been observed in liver cancer cells where serine becomes phenylalanine. Analysis of the mutated protein sequence for a signal peptide shows cleavability at the regular amino acid 20 is lost. DUF781's association with liver development and the missense mutation's association with liver cancer is a correlation that remains to be investigated.

A SignalP analysis of the reference sequence and a sequence with the mutation S18F resulted in a significant drop in cleavage of the signal peptide.
