= C17H25NO =

The molecular formula C_{17}H_{25}NO may refer to:

- Eperisone
- Etazocine
- 3-HO-PCP
- 4'-Methyl-α-pyrrolidinohexiophenone
- PCHP
- 4-Phenyl-4-(1-piperidinyl)cyclohexanol
- α-Pyrrolidinoheptaphenone
- Vesamicol
