= C25H42N7O18P3S =

The molecular formula C_{25}H_{42}N_{7}O_{18}P_{3}S (molar mass: 853.623 g/mol) may refer to:

- Beta-Hydroxybutyryl-CoA
- 3-Hydroxyisobutyryl-CoA
