= Paul Love =

Paul Love may refer to:

- Paul Love, known as Jah Screw (born 1955), Jamaican singer and record producer
- Paul E. Love, American physician and immunologist
