= 3-hydroxyisobutyryl-CoA hydrolase =

Class of enzymes

HIBCH

Identifiers
- Aliases: HIBCH, HIBYLCOAH, 3-hydroxyisobutyryl-CoA hydrolase
- External IDs: OMIM: 610690; MGI: 1923792; GeneCards: HIBCH
Available structures
| PDB | Ortholog search: PDBe RCSB |
| PDB | List of PDB id codes 3BPT |
Enzyme activity
| EC # | BRENDA | ExPASy | KEGG | MetaCyc |
|---|---|---|---|---|
| 3.1.2.4 | ↗ | ↗ | ↗ | ↗ |

Gene location (Human)
| Chr. | Chromosome 2 (human) |
| Band | 2q32.2 | Start | 190,189,735 bp |
| Band | 2q32.2 | End | 190,344,193 bp |

Gene location (Mouse)
| Chr. | Chromosome 1 (mouse) |
| Band | 1|1 C1.1 | Start | 52,884,088 bp |
| Band | 1|1 C1.1 | End | 52,960,145 bp |
RNA expression pattern
| Bgee | Human / Mouse (ortholog); Top expressed in: kidney tubule; renal medulla; right adrenal cortex; jejunum; jejunal mucosa; corpus callosum; left adrenal gland; right lobe of liver; mucosa of transverse colon; Epithelium of choroid plexus / Top expressed in: intercostal muscle; brown adipose tissue; tunica adventitia of aorta; myocardium of ventricle; left lobe of liver; right ventricle; white adipose tissue; parotid gland; cardiac muscle tissue of left ventricle; sternocleidomastoid muscle; More reference expression data |
| BioGPS | n/a |
Gene ontology
| Molecular function | hydrolase activity; 3-hydroxyisobutyryl-CoA hydrolase activity |
| Cellular component | mitochondrial matrix; mitochondrion |
| Biological process | valine catabolic process; branched-chain amino acid catabolic process; fatty acid beta-oxidation |
Sources:Amigo / QuickGO
Orthologs
| Databases | NCBI: entry; OMA: entry |
| Species | Human | Mouse |
| Entrez | 26275 | 227095 |
| Ensembl | ENSG00000198130 | ENSMUSG00000041426 |
| UniProt | Q6NVY1 | Q8QZS1 |
| RefSeq (mRNA) | NM_014362; NM_198047 | NM_146108 |
| RefSeq (protein) | NP_055177; NP_932164 | NP_666220 |
| Location (UCSC) | Chr 2: 190.19 – 190.34 Mb | Chr 1: 52.88 – 52.96 Mb |
| PubMed search |
- Wikidata
| View/Edit Human | View/Edit Mouse |

3-hydroxyisobutyryl-CoA hydrolase
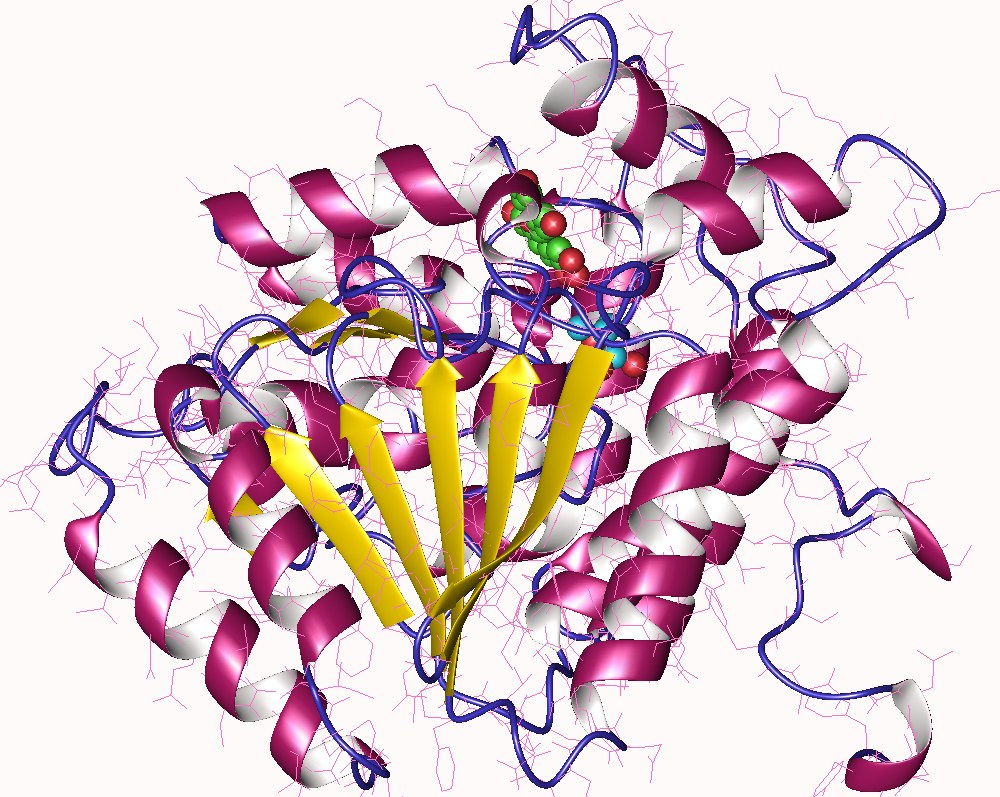
- 3-hydroxyisobutyryl-CoA hydrolase monomer, Human

Identifiers
- EC no.: 3.1.2.4
- CAS no.: 9025-88-1

Databases
- BRENDA: enzyme data
- ExPASy: NiceZyme view
- KEGG: enzyme entry
- MetaCyc: metabolic pathway
- Rhea: reactions
- PDB structures: RCSB PDB PDBe PDBsum
- Gene Ontology: AmiGO / QuickGO
Search
- PMC: articles
- PubMed: articles
- NCBI: proteins

The enzyme 3-hydroxyisobutyryl-CoA hydrolase (EC 3.1.2.4) catalyzes the reaction

3-hydroxyisobutyryl-CoA
H_{2}O
coenzyme A
+
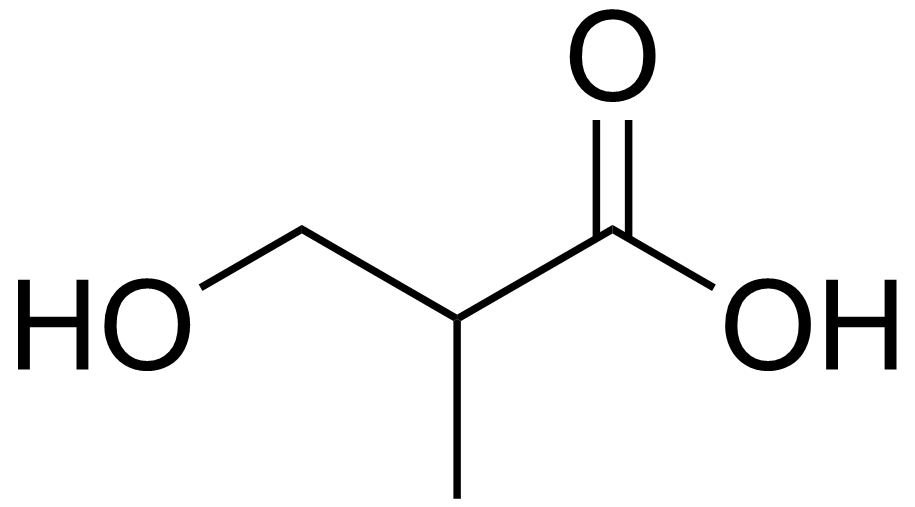
3-Hydroxyisobutyric acid

In humans, 3-hydroxyisobutyryl-CoA hydrolase protein is encoded by the HIBCH gene.

The enzyme characterised from pig heart and Phaeodactylum tricornutum hydrolyses 3-hydroxy-2-methylpropanoyl-CoA to coenzyme A and the acid, 3-hydroxyisobutyric acid, which forms the thioester in the starting material. The reaction is part of a sequence that breaks down the amino acids valine and isoleucine. Deficiency of the enzyme in humans can cause a rare disease with three subtypes.

== Nomenclature ==
This enzyme is a hydrolase, specifically one acting on thioester bonds. The systematic name is 3-hydroxy-2-methylpropanoyl-CoA hydrolase. Other names in common use include:

- 3-hydroxy-isobutyryl CoA hydrolase and
- HIB CoA deacylase
