= Phencyclidine (data page) =

Chemical data page

The complete data for Phencyclidine
General information
Chemical formula: C_{17}H_{25}N
Molar mass: 243.387 ^{b} g·mol^{−1}
Systematic name:
1-(1-phenylcyclohexyl)piperidine ^{a}
Abbreviations: PCP
Synonyms:
- Angel {dust/hair/mist}
- Animal tranquilizer
- Aurora borealis
- Busy bee
- Cadillac
- Crystal{/ joints}
- Cycl{ine/ones}
- Dust
- Elephant tranquilizer
- Elysion
- Embalming fluid
- Goo{d/n}
- Gorilla biscuits
- Green tea leaves
- Hog Dust
- Horse {tracks/tranquilizer}
- Kay Jay
- Killer weed
- Magic mist
- Mint {dew/weed}
- Mist
- Monkey {dust/tranquilizer}
- Peace{/ pill/ weed}
- Pits
- Rocket fuel
- Scuffle
- Selma
- Sernyl{/an}
- Sheets
- Sherm{/an}
- Snorts
- Stardust
- Super Kool
- Super{grass/joint/weed}
- Surfer
- Trank{/s}
- Whack{/y weed}
- Wobble weed
- Zombie dust
Database data
SMILES: C1CCC(CC1)(C2=CC=CC=C2)N3CCCCC3 ^{c}
InChI=1/C17H25N/c1-4-10-16(11-5-1)17(12-6-2-7-13-17)18-14-8-3-9-15-18/h1,4-5,10-11H,2-3,6-9,12-15H2 ^{d}

ATC: N/A	CAS: [60124-79-0]	DrugBank: N/A	EINECS: N/A	PubChem: 6468 ^{e}

Physical properties

Structure	Crystal data	Spectral data: UV-Vis / IR / NMR / MS

Phase behavior	Solid properties T_{m}: 46.5 °C	Liquid properties	Gas properties

Hazard properties

MSDS N/A	Main hazards: N/A	NFPA 704	Flash point: N/A	RTECS number: N/A

Chemical properties

XLogP: 4.878 ^{f}	pI:	pK_{a}:	Tautomers:	Hydrogen bond: donor - 0 ^{g}; acceptor - 1 ^{h}

Pharmacological properties

This box:
- Except where noted otherwise, data relate to Standard temperature and pressure.
- Reliability of data general note.
