= Phencyclidine =

Dissociative hallucinogenic drug, mostly used recreationally

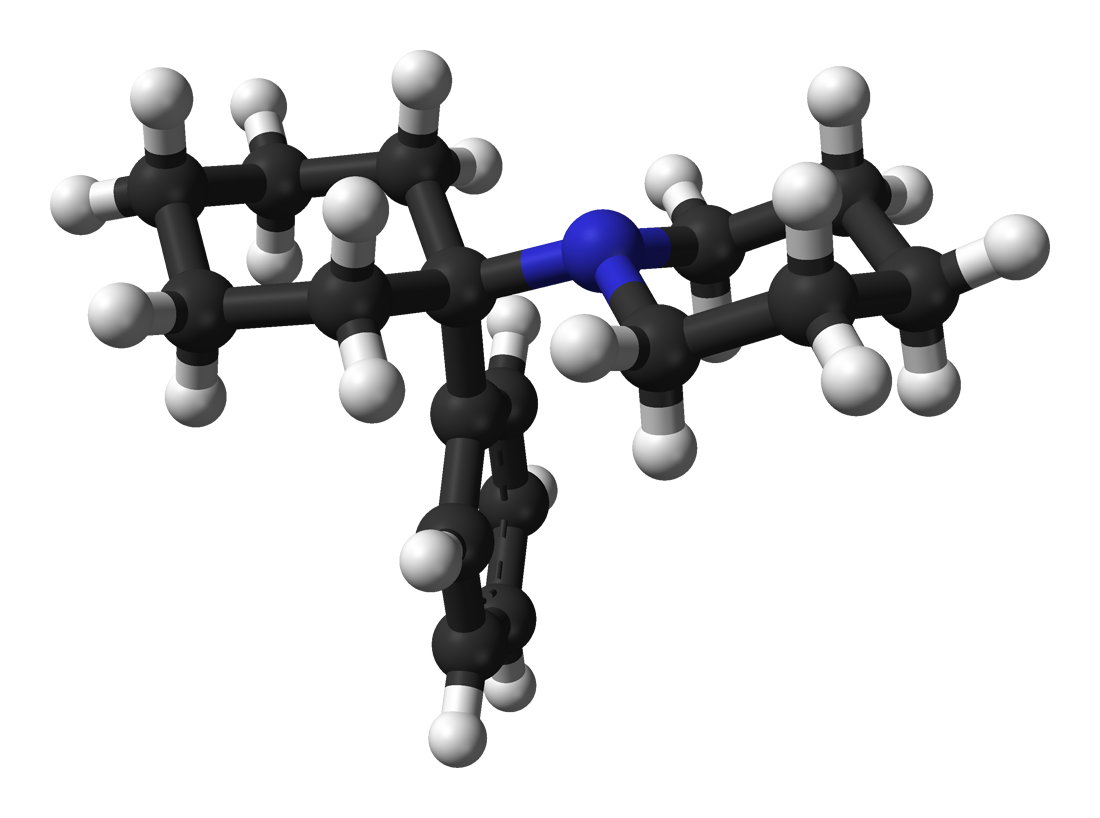

Clinical data
- Trade names: Sernyl, Sernylan (both discontinued)
- Other names: CI-395; Phenylcyclohexylpiperidine; "Angel dust"
- AHFS/Drugs.com: phencyclidine
- Dependence liability: Physical: Low Psychological: Moderate
- Addiction liability: Variable, reported from low to high
- Routes of administration: Smoking, injection, snorted, by mouth
- Drug class: NMDA receptor antagonists; General anesthetics; Dissociative hallucinogens
- ATC code: None

Legal status
- Legal status: AU: S8 (Controlled drug); BR: Class A3 (Psychoactive drugs); CA: Schedule I; DE: Anlage I (Authorized scientific use only); NZ: Class A; UK: Class A; US: Schedule II; UN: Psychotropic Schedule II; Tabella I in Italy

Pharmacokinetic data
- Metabolism: Oxidative hydroxylation in liver by CYP450 enzymes, glucuronidation
- Metabolites: PCHP, PPC, PCAA
- Onset of action: 2–60 min
- Elimination half-life: 7–46 hours
- Duration of action: 6–48 hours
- Excretion: Urine

Identifiers
- IUPAC name: 1-(1-Phenylcyclohexyl)piperidine
- CAS Number: 77-10-1
- PubChem CID: 6468
- IUPHAR/BPS: 4282
- DrugBank: DB03575
- ChemSpider: 6224
- UNII: J1DOI7UV76
- KEGG: C07575
- ChEBI: CHEBI:8058
- ChEMBL: ChEMBL275528
- CompTox Dashboard (EPA): DTXSID6023446
- ECHA InfoCard: 100.150.427

Chemical and physical data
- Formula: C_{17}H_{25}N
- Molar mass: 243.394 g·mol^{−1}
- 3D model (JSmol): Interactive image
- Melting point: 46.5 °C (115.7 °F)
- Boiling point: 136 °C (277 °F)
- SMILES: c1ccccc1C2(CCCCC2)N3CCCCC3
- InChI: InChI=1S/C17H25N/c1-4-10-16(11-5-1)17(12-6-2-7-13-17)18-14-8-3-9-15-18/h1,4-5,10-11H,2-3,6-9,12-15H2; Key:JTJMJGYZQZDUJJ-UHFFFAOYSA-N

Data page
- Phencyclidine (data page)

Phencyclidine or phenylcyclohexyl piperidine (PCP), also known in its use as a street drug as angel dust among other names, is a dissociative anesthetic mainly used recreationally for its significant mind-altering effects. PCP may cause hallucinations, distorted perceptions of sounds, and psychotic behavior. As a recreational drug, it is typically smoked, but may be taken by mouth, snorted, or injected. It may also be mixed with cannabis or tobacco.

Adverse effects may include paranoia, addiction, and an increased risk of suicide, as well as seizures and coma in cases of overdose. Flashbacks may occur despite stopping usage. Chemically, PCP is a member of the arylcyclohexylamine class. PCP works primarily as an NMDA receptor antagonist.

PCP is most commonly used in the US. While usage peaked in the US in the 1970s, between 2005 and 2011, an increase in visits to emergency departments as a result of the drug occurred. As of 2022, in the US, about 0.7% of 12th-grade students reported using PCP in the prior year, while 1.7% of people in the US over age 25 reported using it at some point in their lives.

== Recreational uses ==
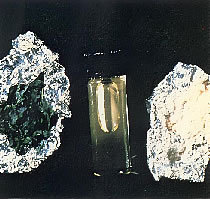
Illicit PCP in several forms seized by the DEA

Phencyclidine is used for its ability to induce a dissociative state.

=== Effects ===
Behavioral effects can vary by dosage. Low doses produce numbness in the extremities and intoxication, characterized by staggering, unsteady gait, slurred speech, bloodshot eyes, and loss of balance. Moderate doses (5–10 mg intranasal, or 0.01–0.02 mg/kg intramuscular or intravenous) will produce analgesia and anesthesia. High doses may lead to convulsions. The drug is often illegally produced under poorly controlled conditions; this means that users may be unaware of the actual dose they are taking.

Psychological effects include severe changes in body image, loss of ego boundaries, paranoia, and depersonalization. Psychosis, agitation and dysphoria, hallucinations, blurred vision, euphoria, and suicidal impulses are also reported, as well as occasional aggressive behavior. PCP may induce feelings of strength, power, and invulnerability as well as a numbing effect on the mind.

Studies by the Drug Abuse Warning Network in the 1970s show that media reports of PCP-induced violence are greatly exaggerated and that incidents of violence are unusual and often limited to individuals with reputations for aggression regardless of drug use. Although uncommon, events of PCP-intoxicated individuals acting in an unpredictable fashion, possibly driven by their delusions or hallucinations, have been publicized. Other commonly cited types of incidents include inflicting property damage and self-mutilation of various types, such as pulling out one's teeth. These effects were not noted in its medicinal use in the 1950s and 1960s, and reports of physical violence on PCP have often been shown to be unfounded.

Recreational doses of the drug also occasionally appear to induce a psychotic state, with emotional and cognitive impairment that resembles a schizophrenic episode. Users generally report feeling detached from reality.

Symptoms are summarized by the mnemonic device RED DANES: rage, erythema (redness of skin), dilated pupils, delusions, amnesia, nystagmus (oscillation of the eyeball when moving laterally), excitation, and skin dryness.

=== Addiction ===
PCP is self-administered and induces ΔFosB expression in the D1-type medium spiny neurons of the nucleus accumbens, and accordingly, excessive PCP use is known to cause addiction. PCP's rewarding and reinforcing effects are at least partly mediated by blocking the NMDA receptors in the glutamatergic inputs to D1-type medium spiny neurons in the nucleus accumbens. PCP has been shown to produce conditioned place aversion and conditioned place preference in animal studies.

=== Schizophrenia ===
A 2019 review found that the transition rate from a diagnosis of hallucinogen-induced psychosis (which included PCP) to that of schizophrenia was 26%. This was lower than cannabis-induced psychosis (34%) but higher than amphetamine- (22%), opioid- (12%), alcohol- (10%), and sedative-induced (9%) psychoses. In comparison, the transition rate to schizophrenia for "brief, atypical and not otherwise specified" psychosis was found to be 36%.

=== Methods of administration ===
PCP has multiple routes of administration. Most commonly, the powder form of the drug is snorted. PCP can also be orally ingested, injected subcutaneously or intravenously, or smoked laced with marijuana or cigarettes.

- PCP can be ingested through smoking. "Fry" and "sherm" are street terms for marijuana or tobacco cigarettes that are dipped in PCP and then dried.
- PCP hydrochloride can be insufflated (snorted), depending upon the purity. This is most often referred to as "angel dust".
- An oral pill can also be compressed from the co-compounded powder form of the drug. This is usually referred to as "peace pill".
- The free base is hydrophobic and may be absorbed through skin and mucous membranes (often inadvertently). This form of the drug is commonly called "wack".

== Management of intoxication ==
Management of PCP intoxication mostly consists of supportive care – controlling breathing, circulation, and body temperature – and, in the early stages, treating psychiatric symptoms. Benzodiazepines, such as lorazepam, are the drugs of choice to control agitation and seizures (when present). Typical antipsychotics such as phenothiazines and haloperidol have been used to control psychotic symptoms, but may produce many undesirable side effects – such as dystonia – and their use is therefore no longer preferred; phenothiazines are particularly risky, as they may lower the seizure threshold, worsen hyperthermia, and boost the anticholinergic effects of PCP. If an antipsychotic is given, intramuscular haloperidol has been recommended.

Forced acid diuresis (with ammonium chloride or, more safely, ascorbic acid) may increase the clearance of PCP from the body, and was somewhat controversially recommended in the past as a decontamination measure. However, it is now known that only around 10% of a dose of PCP is removed by the kidneys, which would make increased urinary clearance of little consequence; furthermore, urinary acidification is dangerous, as it may induce acidosis and worsen rhabdomyolysis (muscle breakdown), a not-unusual manifestation of PCP toxicity.

== Pharmacology ==
=== Pharmacodynamics ===
Phencyclidine
| Site | K_{i} (nM) | Action | Species | Ref. |
|---|---|---|---|---|
| NMDA (PCP_{1}) | 59 | Antagonist | Human | |
| MOR | >10,000 | ND | Human | |
| DOR | >10,000 | ND | Human | |
| KOR | >10,000 | ND | Human | |
| NOP | >10,000 | ND | Human | |
| σ_{1} | >10,000 | Agonist | Guinea pig | |
| σ_{2} | 136 | Agonist | Rat | |
| D_{2} | >10,000 | ND | Human | |
| D_{2}^{High} | 2.7–4.3; 144 (EC_{50}) | Partial Agonist | Rat/human; Human | |
| 5-HT_{2A} | >10,000 | ND | Human | |
| 5-HT_{2A}^{High} | ≥5,000 | Partial Agonist | Rat | |
| SERT | 2,234 | Inhibitor | Human | |
| NET | >10,000 | Inhibitor | Human | |
| DAT | >10,000 | Inhibitor | Human | |
| PCP_{2} | 154 | agonist | Human | |
| [^{3}H]5-HT uptake | 1,424 (IC_{50}) | Inhibitor | Rat | |
| [^{3}H]NIS binding | 16,628 (IC_{50}) | Inhibitor | Rat | |
| [^{3}H]DA uptake | 347 (IC_{50}) | Inhibitor | Rat | |
| [^{3}H]CFT binding | 1,547 (IC_{50}) | Inhibitor | Rat | |
Values are K_{i} (nM). The smaller the value, the more strongly the drug binds to the site.

PCP is well known for its primary action on the NMDA receptor, an ionotropic glutamate receptor. As such, PCP is a non-competitive NMDA receptor antagonist. The role of NMDAR antagonism in the effect of PCP, ketamine, and related dissociative agents was first published in the early 1980s by David Lodge and colleagues. Other NMDA receptor antagonists include ketamine, tiletamine, dextromethorphan, nitrous oxide, and dizocilpine (MK-801).

Research also indicates that PCP inhibits nicotinic acetylcholine receptors (nAChRs) among other mechanisms. Analogues of PCP exhibit varying potency at nACh receptors and NMDA receptors. Findings demonstrate that presynaptic nAChRs and NMDA receptor interactions influence the postsynaptic maturation of glutamatergic synapses and consequently impact synaptic development and plasticity in the brain. These effects can lead to inhibition of excitatory glutamate activity in certain brain regions such as the hippocampus and cerebellum thus potentially leading to memory loss as one of the effects of prolonged use. Acute effects on the cerebellum manifest as changes in blood pressure, breathing rate, pulse rate, and loss of muscular coordination during intoxication.

PCP, like ketamine, also acts as a potent dopamine D_{2}^{High} receptor partial agonist in rat brain homogenate and has affinity for the human cloned D_{2}^{High} receptor. This activity may be associated with some of the other more psychotic features of PCP intoxication, which is evidenced by the successful use of D_{2} receptor antagonists (such as haloperidol) in the treatment of PCP psychosis.

In addition to its well-explored interactions with NMDA receptors, PCP has also been shown to inhibit dopamine reuptake, and thereby leads to increased extracellular levels of dopamine and hence increased dopaminergic neurotransmission. However, PCP has little affinity for the human monoamine transporters, including the dopamine transporter (DAT). Instead, its inhibition of monoamine reuptake may be mediated by interactions with allosteric sites on the monoamine transporters. PCP is notably a high-affinity ligand of the PCP site 2 (K_{i} = 154 nM), a not-well-characterized site associated with monoamine reuptake inhibition.

Studies on rats indicate that PCP interacts indirectly with opioid receptors (endorphin and enkephalin) to produce analgesia.

A binding study assessed PCP at 56 sites including neurotransmitter receptors and transporters and found that PCP had K_{i} values of >10,000 nM at all sites except the dizocilpine (MK-801) site of the NMDA receptor (K_{i} = 59 nM), the σ_{2} receptor (PC12) (K_{i} = 136 nM), and the serotonin transporter (K_{i} = 2,234 nM). The study notably found K_{i} values of >10,000 nM for the D_{2} receptor, the opioid receptors, the σ_{1} receptor, and the dopamine and norepinephrine transporters. These results suggest that PCP is a highly selective ligand of the NMDAR and σ_{2} receptor. However, PCP may also interact with allosteric sites on the monoamine transporters to produce inhibition of monoamine reuptake.

=== Mechanism of action ===
Phencyclidine is a noncompetitive NMDA receptor antagonist that blocks the activity of the NMDA receptor to cause anaesthesia and analgesia without causing cardiorespiratory depression. NMDA is an excitatory receptor in the brain, when activated normally the receptor acts as an ion channel and there is an influx of positive ions through the channel to cause nerve cell depolarisation. Phencyclidine inhibits the NMDA receptor by binding to the specific PCP binding site located within the ion channel. The PCP binding site is near the magnesium blocking site, which may explain the similar inhibitory effects. Binding at the PCP site is mediated by two non-covalent interactions within the receptor: hydrogen bonding and hydrophobic interaction. Binding is also controlled by the gating mechanism of the ion channel. Because the PCP site is located within the ion channel, a coagonist such as glycine must bind and open the channel for PCP to enter, bind to the PCP site, and block the channel.

==== Neurotoxicity ====
Some studies found that, like other NMDA receptor antagonists, PCP can cause a kind of brain damage called Olney's lesions in rats. Studies conducted on rats showed that high doses of the NMDA receptor antagonist dizocilpine caused reversible vacuoles to form in certain regions of the rats' brains. All studies of Olney's lesions have only been performed on non-human animals and may not apply to humans. One unpublished study by Frank Sharp reportedly showed no damage by the NMDA antagonist ketamine, a structurally similar drug, far beyond recreational doses, but due to the study never having been published, its validity is controversial.

PCP has also been shown to cause schizophrenia-like changes in N-acetylaspartate and N-acetylaspartylglutamate levels in the rat brain, which are detectable both in living rats and upon necropsy examination of brain tissue. It also induces symptoms in humans that mimic schizophrenia. PCP not only produced symptoms similar to schizophrenia, it also yielded electroencephalogram changes in the thalamocortical pathway (increased delta decreased alpha) and in the hippocampus (increase theta bursts) that were similar to those in schizophrenia. PCP-induced augmentation of dopamine release may link the NMDA and dopamine hypotheses of schizophrenia.

=== Pharmacokinetics ===
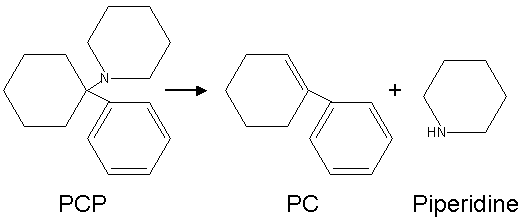
Conversion of PCP into PC and piperidine by heat

PCP is both water- and lipid-soluble and is therefore distributed throughout the body quickly. PCP is metabolized into PCHP, PPC and PCAA. The drug is metabolized 90% by oxidative hydroxylation in the liver during the first pass. Metabolites are glucuronidated and excreted in the urine. Nine percent of ingested PCP is excreted in its unchanged form.

When smoked, some of the compound is broken down by heat into 1-phenylcyclohexene (PC) and piperidine.

The time taken before the effects of PCP manifest is dependent on the route of administration. The onset of action for inhalation occurs in 2–5 minutes, whereas the effects may take 15 to 60 minutes when ingested orally.

== Chemistry ==
PCP is an arylcyclohexylamine.

=== Analogues ===
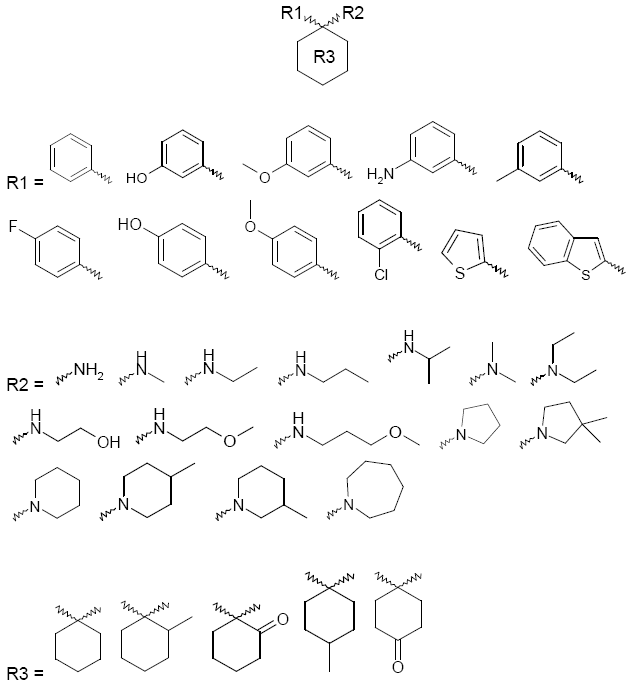
Possible analogues of PCP

Fewer than 30 different analogs of PCP were reported as being used as a street drug during the 1970s and 1980s, mainly in the United States. Only a few of these compounds were widely used, including rolicyclidine (PCPy), eticyclidine (PCE), and tenocyclidine (TCP). Less common analogs include 3-HO-PCP, 3-MeO-PCMo, and 3-MeO-PCP.

The generalized structural motif required for PCP-like activity is derived from structure-activity relationship studies of PCP derivatives. All of these derivatives are likely to share some of their psychoactive effects with PCP itself, although a range of potencies and varying mixtures of anesthetic, dissociative, and stimulant effects are known, depending on the particular drug and its substituents. In the United States, all of these compounds would be considered controlled substance analogs of PCP under the Federal Analog Act and are hence illegal drugs if sold for human consumption.

== History ==
Phencyclidine was initially discovered in 1926 by Arthur Kötz and his student Paul Merkel as a product of a Grignard reaction of 1-piperidinocyclohexancarbonitrile.

It was again synthesized in 1956 by chemist H Victor Maddox and brought to market as an anesthetic medication by pharmaceutical company Parke-Davis, now a subsidiary of Pfizer. Its use in humans was disallowed in the US in 1965 due to the high rates of side effects, while its use in animals was disallowed in 1978. Moreover, ketamine was discovered and was better tolerated as an anesthetic.

PCP is classified as a schedule II drug in the US. Derivatives of PCP have been sold for recreational and non-medical use.

== Society and culture ==
=== Regulation ===
PCP is a Schedule II substance in the US. The Administrative Controlled Substances Code Number (ACSCN) for PCP is 7471. Its manufacturing quota for 2014 was 19 grams (0.67 oz). It is a Schedule I drug by the Controlled Drugs and Substances act in Canada, a List I drug of the Opium Law in the Netherlands, and a Class A substance in the UK.

=== Frequency of use ===
PCP began to emerge as a recreational drug in major cities in the US in the 1960s. In 1978, People magazine and Mike Wallace of the TV news program 60 Minutes called PCP the country's "number one drug problem". Although recreational use of the drug had always been relatively low, it began declining significantly in the 1980s. In surveys, the number of high school students admitting to trying PCP at least once fell from 13% in 1979 to less than 3% in 1990.

=== Cultural depictions ===
Jean-Michel Basquiat depicted two angel dust users in his 1982 painting Dustheads.

Tsukasa Hojo's 1985 manga City Hunter features a drug, Angel Dust, presumably a reference to PCP's street name. The related 2023 animated film, City Hunter: Angel Dust, more directly moved the franchise's angel dust into the realm of fantasy, as it is portrayed as a science fiction nanomachine serum developed by a biotech company to create super-soldiers with a tendency to drive them berserk, side-stepping the real-life PCP.
