= Paul E. Love =

American physician and immunologist

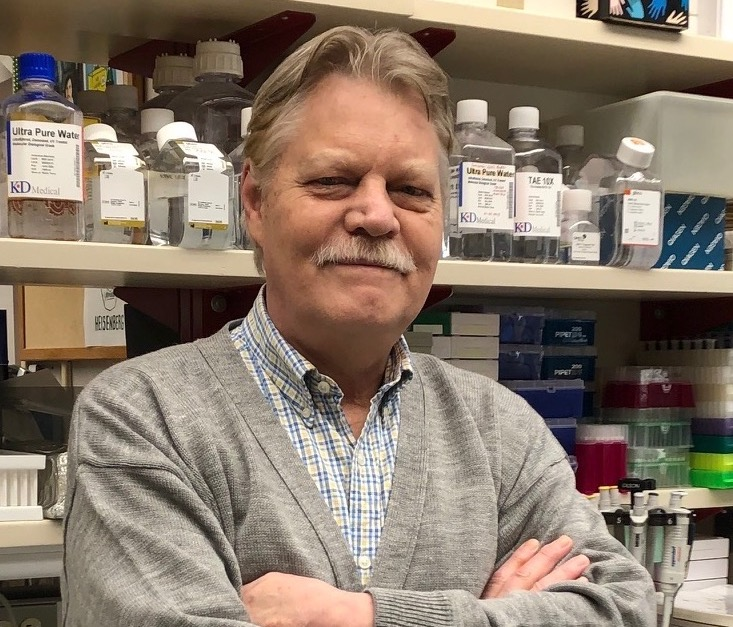
- Education: Syracuse University; University of Rochester School of Medicine
- Known for: T cell antigen receptor signaling; Immuno-receptor-tyrosine based activation motifs (ITAMs); Mammalian T cell development
- Scientific career
- Fields: Immunology; Developmental Biology
- Workplaces: National Institutes of Health

Paul Ernest Love is an American physician and Immunologist. He is a senior investigator and head of the Section on Hematopoiesis and Lymphocyte Biology at Eunice Kennedy Shriver National Institute of Child Health and Human Development. His research focus is in the area of mammalian hematopoiesis.

== Education ==
Love earned his B.S. in biochemistry, summa cum laude, from Syracuse University. He received his M.D. and a Ph.D. in the MSTP program at the University of Rochester.

== Career ==
Love started his career as an intramural Principal Investigator in 1993 and is now a tenured senior investigator at NICHD. He was a commissioned officer in the United States Public Health Service from 1989 to 2019 and retired with the rank of captain in 2019.

His lab is part of the Eunice Kennedy Shriver National Institute of Child Health and Human Development (NICHD) and investigates T cell development.

Love and his colleagues have conducted studies on several aspects of mammalian T cell development including the role of T cell antigen receptor (TCR) signaling and the role of the newly identified molecule, THEMIS (protein), in T cell development and for T cell function.

== Selected publications ==
- Love, Paul; Lesourne, Renaud; Argenty, Jérémy; Lee, Jan; Zvezdova, Ekaterina; Warzecha, Claude; Choi, Seeyoung (2017). "THEMIS enhances TCR signaling and enables positive selection by selective inhibition of the phosphatase SHP-1". Nature Immunology. 18 (4): 433–441. doi:10.1038/ni.3692. PMC 5807080. PMID 28250424.
- Love, Paul; Shores, E W (2000). "ITAM multiplicity and thymocyte selection: how low can you go?". Immunity. 12 (6): 591–597. doi:10.1016/s1074-7613(00)80210-1. PMID 10894159.
- Love, Paul; Zhao, Bin; Dutta, Avik (2021). "New insights into TCR β-selection". Trends Immunol. 42 (8): 735–750. doi:10.1016/j.it.2021.06.005. PMID 34261578. S2CID 235907092.
- Love, Paul; Shores, E W (1997). "TCR zeta chain in T cell development and selection". Curr Opin Immunol. 9 (3): 380–389. doi:10.1016/s0952-7915(97)80085-4. PMID 9203416.
- Full list of publications: https://pubmed.ncbi.nlm.nih.gov/?term=love+pe&sort=pubdate&size=200
