= Naphthoate synthase =

Class of enzymes

1,4-dihydroxy-2-naphthoyl-CoA synthase
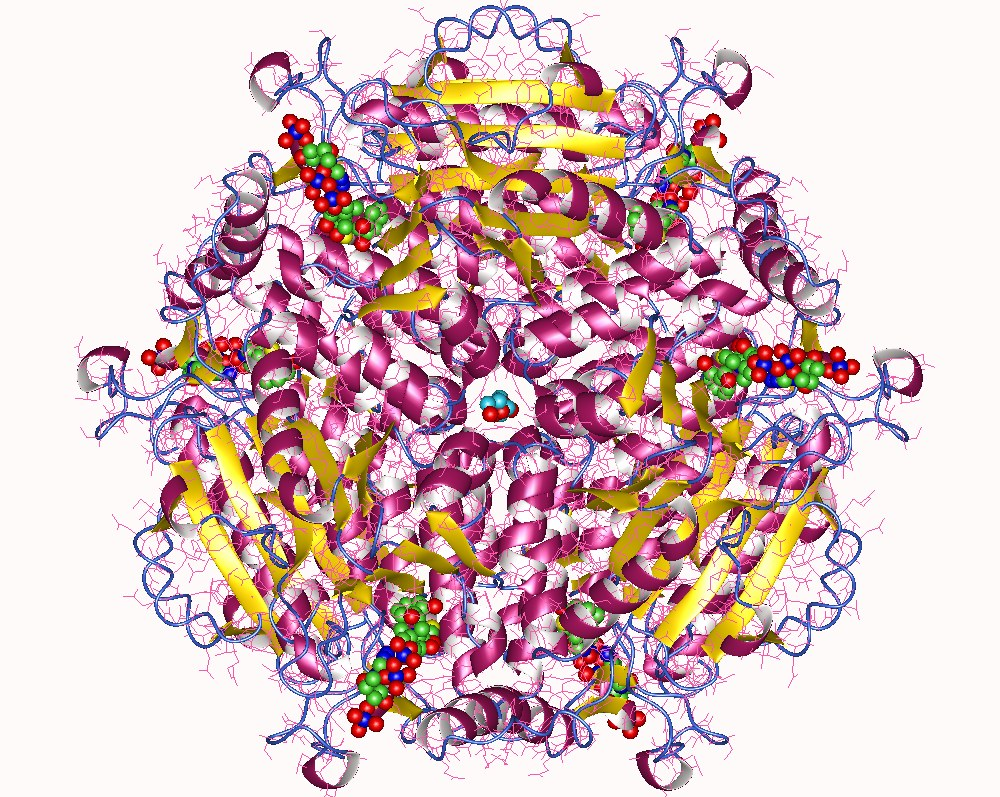
- 1,4-Dihydroxy-2-naphthoyl-CoA synthase hexamer, Mycobacterium tuberculosis

Identifiers
- EC no.: 4.1.3.36
- CAS no.: 72506-71-9

Databases
- IntEnz: IntEnz view
- BRENDA: BRENDA entry
- ExPASy: NiceZyme view
- KEGG: KEGG entry
- MetaCyc: metabolic pathway
- PRIAM: profile
- PDB structures: RCSB PDB PDBe PDBsum
- Gene Ontology: AmiGO / QuickGO
Search
- PMC: articles
- PubMed: articles
- NCBI: proteins

The enzyme 1,4-dihydroxy-2-naphthoyl-CoA synthase (EC 4.1.3.36) catalyzes the sixth step in the biosynthesis of phylloquinone and menaquinone, the two forms of vitamin K. In E. coli, 1,4-dihydroxy-2-naphthoyl-CoA synthase, formerly known as naphthoate synthase, is encoded by menB and uses O-succinylbenzoyl-CoA as a substrate and converts it to 1,4-dihydroxy-2-naphthoyl-CoA.

== Nomenclature ==
MenB is part of the crotonase fold super family, named after the crotonase fold in their structure. The systematic name for MenB is 4-(2-carboxyphenyl)-4-oxobutanoyl-CoA dehydratase (cyclizing). Other common names include:

- Naphthoate synthase
- 1,4-dihydroxy-2-naphthoate synthase
- Dihydroxynaphthoate synthase
- DHNA-CoA synthase

== Reaction ==
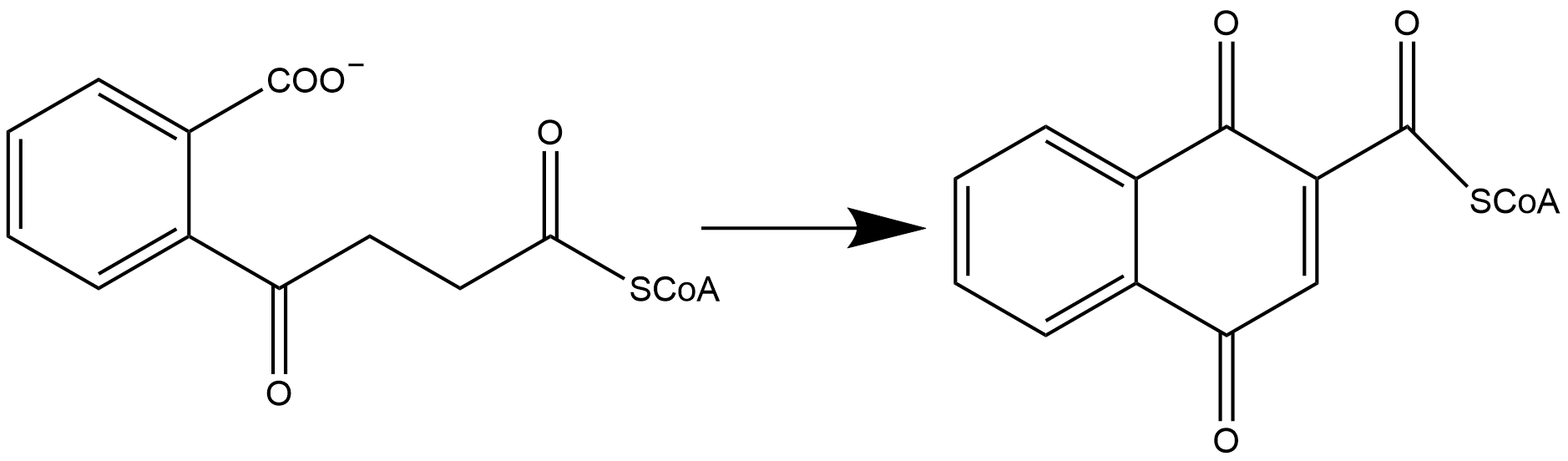
This is a skeletal structure of the reaction that MenB catalyzes.

It was originally thought that the product of this reaction had an oxygen where the SCoA currently resides, however; new research has shown that MenB only catalyzes the above reaction. There is a different enzyme that cleaves the SCoA and attaches the oxygen.

== Structure ==
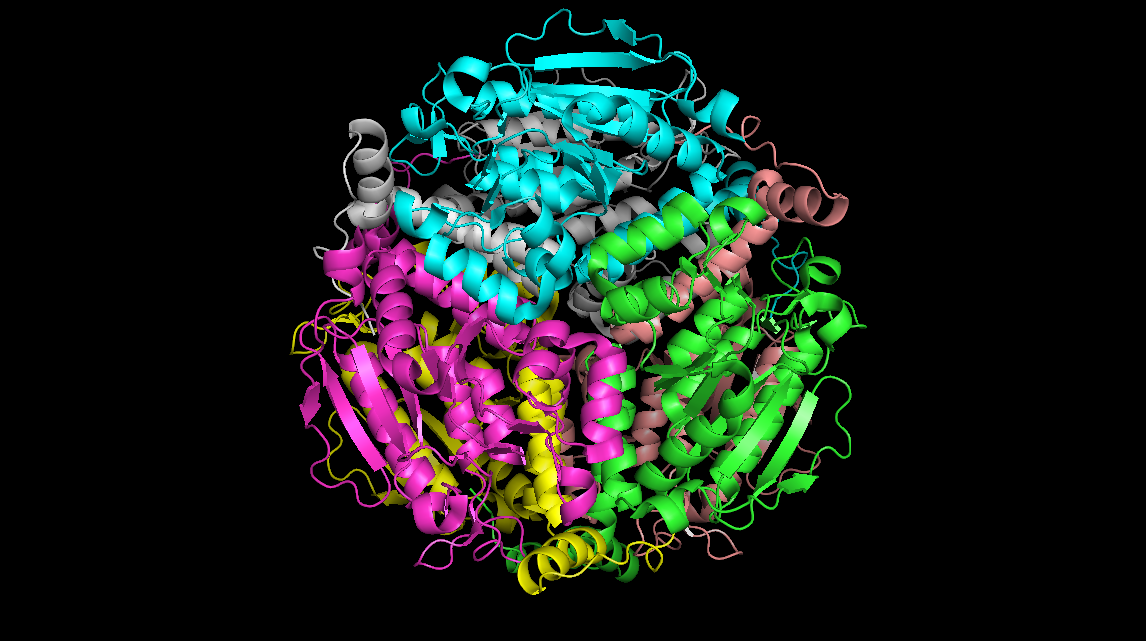
3D cartoon representation of the crystal structure of MenB. Each monomer is colored differently.

MenB is composed of two hexamers in an asymmetric unit, these hexamers are each composed of two trimers in an eclipsed arrangement. Each sub unit of the hexamers has three C terminal alpha helices, and a N terminal spiral core. These sub units come together to form the active site of the enzyme.

The channel formed by alpha helices that can be seen in the middle of the enzyme leads to the active site. This opening exists on both top and bottom of the enzyme, allowing substrates different entry points to the active site, which rests in the middle of the enzyme.

Six different crystal structures have been studied for MenB in Escherichia coli their PDB codes are: 3t88, 3t89, 4els, 4elw, 4elx, and 4i42.

Other structures have been solved for this class of enzymes, with PDB accession codes 1Q51, 1Q52, 1RJM, 1RJN, and 2IEX.

== Homologs ==
Homologous genes MenB exist in many different organisms, such as; Galium mollugo, Geobacillus kaustophilus, Mycobacterium phlei, Mycobacterium tuberculosis, Spinacia oleracea, and Staphylococcus aureus.

MenB is only found in biosynthesis pathways in plants and bacteria, it does not exist in any other organisms. However, mammals require vitamin K in their diet because it is vital in the blood clotting process.

== Cofactors/Inhibitors ==
MenB does not require any cofactors to catalyze the reaction.

In the organism Escherichia coli three inhibitors exist: 1-hydroxy-2-naphthoyl-CoA, 2,3-dihydroxybenzoyl-CoA, and 2,4-dihydroxybenzoyl-CoA.
