= 3-Hydroxyisobutyryl-CoA =

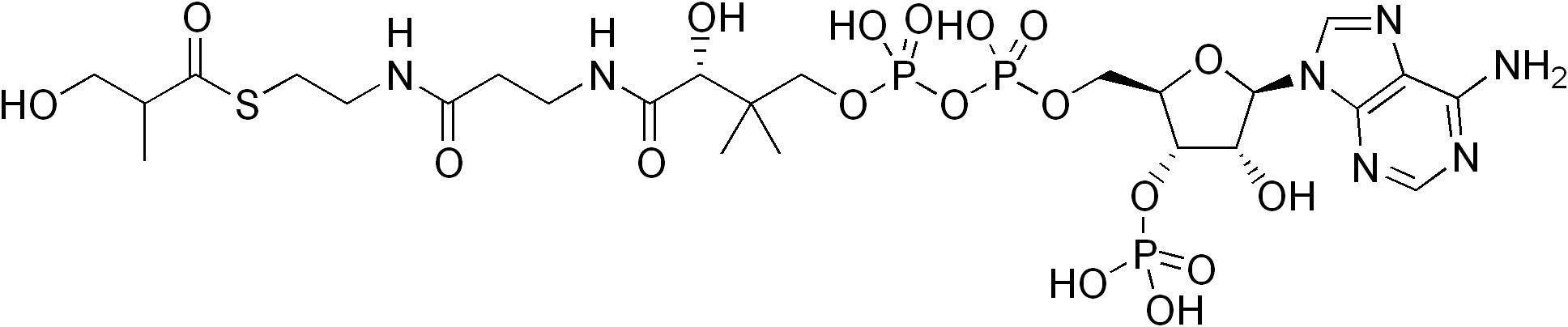

Names
- IUPAC name 3′-O-Phosphonoadenosine 5′-[(3R)-3-hydroxy-4-({3-[(2-{[(2Ξ)-3-hydroxy-2-methylpropanoyl]sulfanyl}ethyl)amino]-3-oxopropyl}amino)-2,2-dimethyl-4-oxobutyl dihydrogen diphosphate]
- Systematic IUPAC name O^{1}-{[(2R,3S,4R,5R)-5-(6-Amino-9H-purin-9-yl)-4-hydroxy-3-(phosphonooxy)oxolan-2-yl]methyl} O^{3}-[(3R)-3-hydroxy-4-({3-[(2-{[(2Ξ)-3-hydroxy-2-methylpropanoyl]sulfanyl}ethyl)amino]-3-oxopropyl}amino)-2,2-dimethyl-4-oxobutyl] dihydrogen diphosphate

Identifiers
CAS Number	319440-43-2
3D model (JSmol)	Interactive image
ChemSpider	389192
PubChem CID	440205
CompTox Dashboard (EPA)	DTXSID501027517
- InChI: InChI=1S/C25H42N7O18P3S/c1-13(8-33)24(38)54-7-6-27-15(34)4-5-28-22(37)19(36)25(2,3)10-47-53(44,45)50-52(42,43)46-9-14-18(49-51(39,40)41)17(35)23(48-14)32-12-31-16-20(26)29-11-30-21(16)32/h11-14,17-19,23,33,35-36H,4-10H2,1-3H3,(H,27,34)(H,28,37)(H,42,43)(H,44,45)(H2,26,29,30)(H2,39,40,41)/t13?,14-,17-,18-,19?,23-/m1/s1 Key: WWEOGFZEFHPUAM-VRQRJWBYSA-N; InChI=1/C25H42N7O18P3S/c1-13(8-33)24(38)54-7-6-27-15(34)4-5-28-22(37)19(36)25(2,3)10-47-53(44,45)50-52(42,43)46-9-14-18(49-51(39,40)41)17(35)23(48-14)32-12-31-16-20(26)29-11-30-21(16)32/h11-14,17-19,23,33,35-36H,4-10H2,1-3H3,(H,27,34)(H,28,37)(H,42,43)(H,44,45)(H2,26,29,30)(H2,39,40,41)/t13?,14-,17-,18-,19?,23-/m1/s1 Key: WWEOGFZEFHPUAM-VRQRJWBYBU
- SMILES: O=C(SCCNC(=O)CCNC(=O)C(O)C(C)(C)COP(=O)(O)OP(=O)(O)OC[C@H]3O[C@@H](n2cnc1c(ncnc12)N)[C@H](O)[C@@H]3OP(=O)(O)O)C(C)CO

Properties
Chemical formula	C_{25}H_{42}N_{7}O_{18}P_{3}S
Molar mass	853.62 g/mol
- Except where otherwise noted, data are given for materials in their standard state (at 25 °C [77 °F], 100 kPa). verify (what is ?) Infobox references

3-Hydroxyisobutyryl-CoA (or 3-hydroxy-2-methylpropanoyl-CoA) is an intermediate in the metabolism of valine.

== See also ==
- 3-hydroxyisobutyryl-CoA hydrolase
- 3-Hydroxyisobutyryl-CoA deacylase deficiency
