= PCP site 2 =

Phencyclidine (PCP), a high-affinity ligand of PCP site 2.

PCP site 2 is a binding site that was identified as a high-affinity target for phencyclidine (PCP), an anesthetic and dissociative hallucinogen that acts primarily as an NMDA receptor antagonist. The site is distinct from the PCP binding site on the NMDA receptor (otherwise known as PCP site 1) and the common/main sites on the monoamine transporters (SERT, DAT, NET). It is associated with monoamine reuptake inhibition, and it has been suggested that the site may be an allosteric/regulatory site of the monoamine transporters.

RTI-4793-14 (HBMP), a ligand with high affinity for the PCP site 2 and high selectivity for this site over the PCP site 1, has been developed. Similarly to PCP, RTI-4793-1 inhibits monoamine reuptake with moderate potency, but unlike PCP, has very low potency as an NMDA receptor antagonist. It shows a profile of a serotonin–norepinephrine–dopamine reuptake inhibitor (SNDRI). Although this was inferred to be related to binding to the PCP site 2, subsequent research found that RTI-4793-14 also has considerable affinity for the DAT; it does not appear to have been characterized at the SERT or NET, but may bind to them similarly, and these interactions could potentially explain its monoamine reuptake inhibition as an alternative to the PCP site 2.

== Activity profiles ==
Selected ligands, PCP sites, monoamine reuptake, and NMDAR inhibition
Compound	RTI-4793-14	Phencyclidine	(+)-MK801	Indatraline
PCP site 2	37.9	92.4	>10000	2529
PCP site 1 (NMDAR)	>36000	117	4.58	>20000
[^{3}H]5-HT uptake	1024	1424	>4700	4.49
[^{3}H]DA uptake	547	347	>10000	3.23
[^{3}H]CFT binding	850	1547	>15000	4.32
[^{3}H]Nisoxetine binding	609	16628	6576	2.27
NMDA-induced current	768	2	0.020	95
All values are IC_{50} (nM), except NMDA-induced current, which is IC_{50} (μM).

Ligand-selectivity in human brain
Compound	PCP site 1 (K_{i}, nM)	PCP site 2 (K_{i}, nM)	Site 1 / Site 2
(+)-MK-801	8.9	11367	0.00078
Tenocyclidine	19.8	197	0.10
Phencyclidine	43.8	154	0.28
Dexoxadrol	92	1234	0.075
Tiletamine	93	17050	0.0055
Ketamine	831	59388	0.014
Vanoxerine	30925	6841	4.5
BTCP	46436	2102	22.1
Benztropine	78179	2338	33.4
Bupropion	101239	37519	2.7
Fluoxetine	106402	1677	63.4
(–)-Cocaine	26739	423055	0.063

Ligand-selectivity in guinea pig brain
Compound	PCP site 1 (K_{i}, nM)	PCP site 2 (K_{i}, nM)	Site 1 / Site 2
Pargyline	>1000000	3643	>274
D-Amphetamine	80501	959	41.1
Clomipramine	63437	4684	13.5
(–)-Cocaine	282362	6014	46.9
(+)-Cocaine	>1000000	6383	>157
Fluoxetine	264590	929	285
Mazindol	218993	919	238
Vanoxerine	102118	3167	32
Benztropine	156890	183	857
Xylamine	>1000000	679	>1473
Desipramine	11954	2137	5.6
Nomifensine	139456	2604	54
Bupropion	>1000000	704	>1420
BTCP	>1000000	1083	>923
Ketamine	813	4702	0.17
Tiletamine	79.3	1394	0.057
JMIII41C	70	9298	0.0075
JMII79B	12.7	18557	0.00068
PCA	1262	1327	1.05
PPA	6463	3200	2.0
