= ECHS1 =

Protein-coding gene in humans

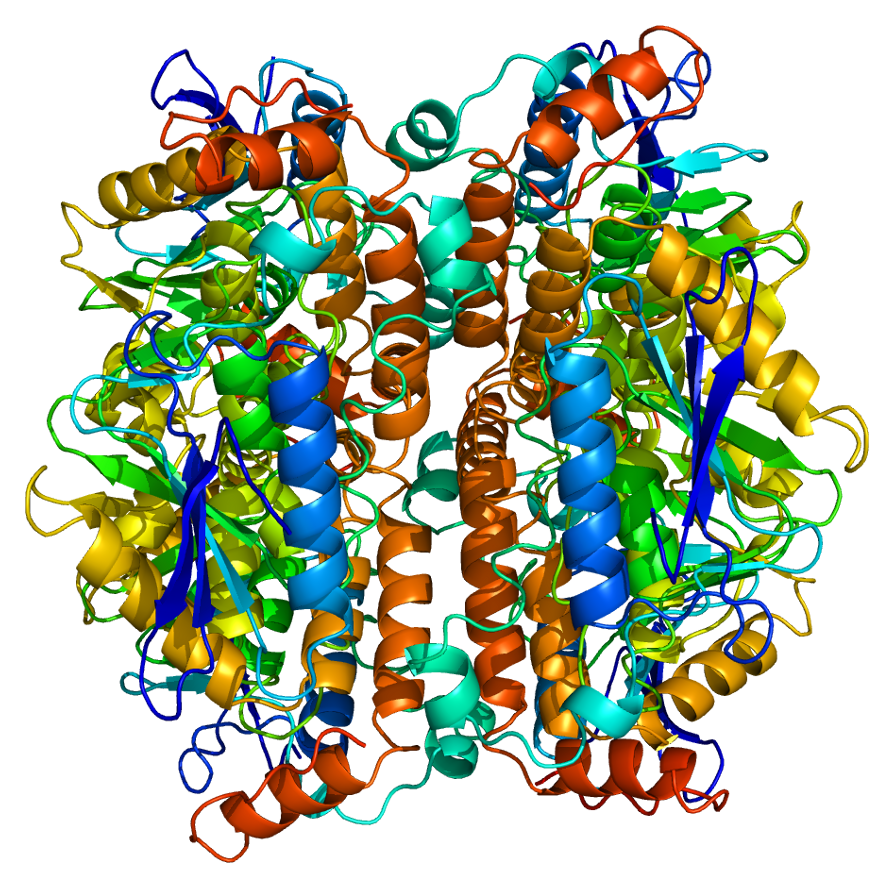

Identifiers
- Aliases: ECHS1, SCEH, ECHS1D, enoyl-CoA hydratase, short chain, 1, mitochondrial, enoyl-CoA hydratase, short chain 1, mECH, mECH1
- External IDs: OMIM: 602292; MGI: 2136460; GeneCards: ECHS1
Available structures
PDB	Ortholog search: PDBe RCSB
PDB	List of PDB id codes 2HW5
Enzyme activity
EC #	BRENDA	ExPASy	KEGG	MetaCyc
4.2.1.17	↗	↗	↗	↗
5.3.3.8	↗	↗	↗	↗

Gene location (Human)
Chr.	Chromosome 10 (human)
Band	10q26.3	Start	133,362,485 bp
Band	10q26.3	End	133,373,354 bp

Gene location (Mouse)
Chr.	Chromosome 7 (mouse)
Band	7|7 F4	Start	139,685,623 bp
Band	7|7 F4	End	139,696,389 bp
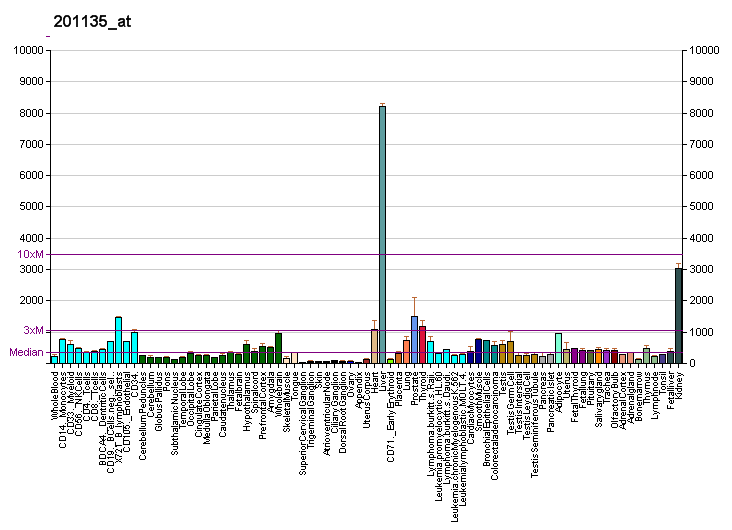
RNA expression pattern
Bgee	Human / Mouse (ortholog); Top expressed in: right lobe of liver; kidney tubule; parotid gland; human kidney; mucosa of transverse colon; jejunal mucosa; renal medulla; glomerulus; apex of heart; metanephric glomerulus / Top expressed in: brown adipose tissue; right ventricle; right kidney; left lobe of liver; myocardium of ventricle; digastric muscle; interventricular septum; cardiac muscles; adrenal gland; white adipose tissue; More reference expression data
BioGPS	More reference expression data
Gene ontology
Molecular function	protein binding; catalytic activity; lyase activity; enoyl-CoA hydratase activity
Cellular component	mitochondrial matrix; mitochondrion
Biological process	metabolism; fatty acid metabolic process; lipid metabolism; fatty acid beta-oxidation
Sources:Amigo / QuickGO
Orthologs
Databases	NCBI: entry; OMA: entry
Species	Human	Mouse
Entrez	1892	93747
Ensembl	ENSG00000127884	ENSMUSG00000025465
UniProt	P30084	Q8BH95
RefSeq (mRNA)	NM_004092	NM_053119
RefSeq (protein)	NP_004083	NP_444349
Location (UCSC)	Chr 10: 133.36 – 133.37 Mb	Chr 7: 139.69 – 139.7 Mb
PubMed search
- Wikidata
View/Edit Human	View/Edit Mouse

Enoyl Coenzyme A hydratase, short chain, 1, mitochondrial, also known as ECHS1, is a human gene.

The protein encoded by this gene functions in the second step of the mitochondrial fatty acid beta-oxidation pathway. It catalyzes the hydration of 2-trans-enoyl-coenzyme A (CoA) intermediates to L-3-hydroxyacyl-CoAs. The gene product is a member of the hydratase/isomerase superfamily. It localizes to the mitochondrial matrix. Transcript variants utilizing alternative transcription initiation sites have been described in the literature.

== Structure ==
The ECHS1 gene is approximately 11 kb in length, and is composed of eight exons, with exons I and VIII containing the 5'- and 3'-untranslated regions, respectively. There are two major transcription start sites, located 62 and 63 bp upstream of the translation codon, were mapped by primer extension analysis. The 5'-flanking region of the ECHS1 gene is GC-rich and contains several copies of the SP1 binding motive but no typical TATA or CAAT boxes are apparent. Alu repeat elements have been identified within the region -1052/-770 relative to the cap site and in intron 7. The precursor polypeptide contains 290 amino acid residues, with an N-terminal mitochondrial targeting domain (1-27,28,29) leading to a ragged mature N-terminus. The mRNA has a 5'-untranslated sequence of 21 bp and a 3'-untranslated sequence of 391 bp.

== Function ==
Enoyl-CoA hydratase (ECH) catalyzes the second step in beta-oxidation pathway of fatty acid metabolism. The enzyme is involved in the formation of a β-hydroxyacyl-CoA thioester. The two catalytic glutamic acid residues are believed to act in concert to activate a water molecule, while Gly-141 is proposed to be involved in substrate activation. There are two potent inhibitors of ECHS, which irreversibly inactivate the enzyme via covalent adduct formation.

== Clinical significance ==
Enoyl-CoA hydratase short chain has been confirmed to interact with STAT3, such that ECHS1 specifically represses STAT3 activity by inhibiting STAT3 phosphorylation. STAT3 can act as both an oncogene and a tumor suppressor. ECHS1 itself has shown to occur in many cancers, particularly in hepatocellular carcinoma (HCC) development; both exogenous and endogenous forms of ECHS1 bind to HBs and induce apoptosis as a result. This means that ECHS1 may be used in the future as a therapy for patients with HBV-related hepatitis or HCC.
