= R-spondin 3 =

Protein-coding gene in the species Homo sapiens

RSPO3

Identifiers
- Aliases: RSPO3, CRISTIN1, PWTSR, THSD2, R-spondin 3
- External IDs: OMIM: 610574; MGI: 1920030; GeneCards: RSPO3

Gene location (Human)
Chr.	Chromosome 6 (human)
Band	6q22.33	Start	127,118,671 bp
Band	6q22.33	End	127,199,481 bp

Gene location (Mouse)
Chr.	Chromosome 10 (mouse)
Band	10|10 A4	Start	29,328,412 bp
Band	10|10 A4	End	29,411,863 bp
RNA expression pattern
Bgee	Human / Mouse (ortholog); Top expressed in: gastric mucosa; tail of epididymis; caput epididymis; smooth muscle tissue; corpus epididymis; vastus lateralis muscle; superficial temporal artery; buccal mucosa cell; placenta; body of uterus / Top expressed in: vas deferens; otolith organ; tail of embryo; utricle; vestibular sensory epithelium; primitive streak; stria vascularis; stroma of bone marrow; adventitia of seminal vesicle; gastrula; More reference expression data
BioGPS	n/a
Gene ontology
Molecular function	heparin binding; signaling receptor binding; frizzled binding
Cellular component	extracellular region; extracellular space
Biological process	positive regulation of canonical Wnt signaling pathway; positive regulation of Wnt signaling pathway; positive regulation of Wnt signaling pathway, planar cell polarity pathway; Wnt signaling pathway; branching involved in labyrinthine layer morphogenesis; angiogenesis; response to stimulus; blood vessel remodeling; positive regulation of non-canonical Wnt signaling pathway; sprouting angiogenesis; regulation of Wnt signaling pathway
Sources:Amigo / QuickGO
Orthologs
Databases	NCBI: entry; OMA: entry
Species	Human	Mouse
Entrez	84870	72780
Ensembl	ENSG00000146374	ENSMUSG00000019880
UniProt	Q9BXY4	Q2TJ95
RefSeq (mRNA)	NM_032784	NM_028351
RefSeq (protein)	NP_116173	NP_082627
Location (UCSC)	Chr 6: 127.12 – 127.2 Mb	Chr 10: 29.33 – 29.41 Mb
PubMed search
- Wikidata
View/Edit Human	View/Edit Mouse

R-spondin-3 is a protein that in humans is encoded by the RSPO3 gene.

== Function ==
This gene encodes a member of the thrombospondin type 1 repeat gene superfamily. In addition, the protein contains a furin-like cysteine-rich region. Furin-like repeat domains have been found in a variety of eukaryotic proteins involved in the mechanism of signal transduction by receptor tyrosine kinases.

During embryonic development, RSPO3 is expressed in the tail bud and the posterior presomitic mesoderm of the embryo. In tissue engineering, R-spondin 3 has been used to differentiate pluripotent stem cells into paraxial mesoderm progenitors
