= 4-Phenyl-4-(1-piperidinyl)cyclohexanol =

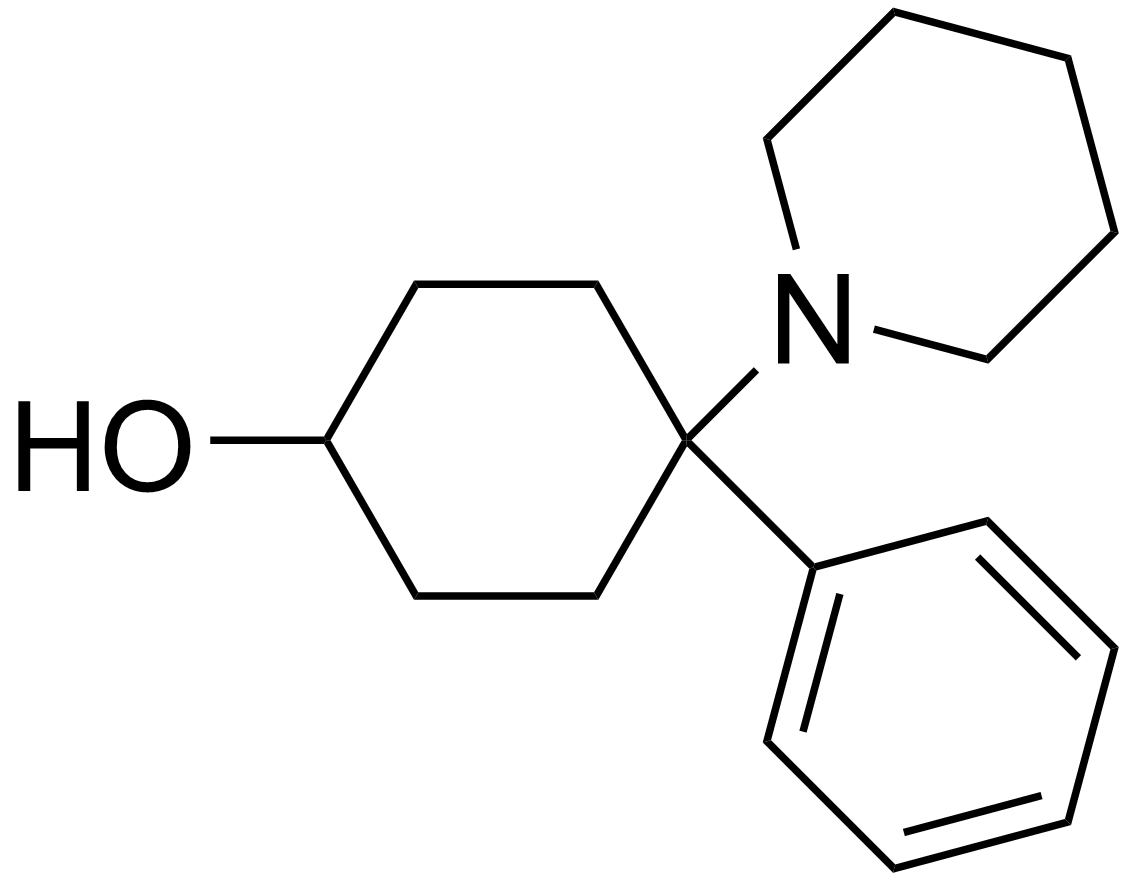

Names
- Preferred IUPAC name 4-Phenyl-4-(piperidin-1-yl)cyclohexan-1-ol
- Other names 4-Phenyl-4-(1-piperidinyl)cyclohexanol

Identifiers
CAS Number	60756-83-4
3D model (JSmol)	Interactive image; Interactive image
ChemSpider	142418
PubChem CID	162171
UNII	TAJ3PEY6RN
CompTox Dashboard (EPA)	DTXSID60209577
- InChI: InChI=1S/C17H25NO/c19-16-9-11-17(12-10-16,15-7-3-1-4-8-15)18-13-5-2-6-14-18/h1,3-4,7-8,16,19H,2,5-6,9-14H2 Key: KPRUAZBLIREHPD-UHFFFAOYSA-N; InChI=1/C17H25NO/c19-16-9-11-17(12-10-16,15-7-3-1-4-8-15)18-13-5-2-6-14-18/h1,3-4,7-8,16,19H,2,5-6,9-14H2 Key: KPRUAZBLIREHPD-UHFFFAOYAM
- SMILES: OC1CCC(N2CCCCC2)(C3=CC=CC=C3)CC1; OC3CCC(c1ccccc1)(N2CCCCC2)CC3

Properties
Chemical formula	C_{17}H_{25}NO
Molar mass	259.391 g/mol
- Except where otherwise noted, data are given for materials in their standard state (at 25 °C [77 °F], 100 kPa). verify (what is ?) Infobox references

4-Phenyl-4-(1-piperidinyl)cyclohexanol, also known as PPC, is an organic chemical which is a metabolite of phencyclidine (PCP). It can be detected in the hair of PCP users.

PPC has been shown to cause increases in locomotor activity in lab mice.

== See also ==
- PCHP, another PCP metabolite
