= KIAA0408 =

Gene on human chromosome 6

Identifiers
- Aliases: KIAA0408
- External IDs: MGI: 3036239; GeneCards: KIAA0408

Gene location (Human)
Chr.	Chromosome 6 (human)
Band	6q22.33	Start	127,438,406 bp
Band	6q22.33	End	127,459,389 bp

Gene location (Mouse)
Chr.	Chromosome 10 (mouse)
Band	10|10 A4	Start	29,087,602 bp
Band	10|10 A4	End	29,106,775 bp
RNA expression pattern
Bgee	Human / Mouse (ortholog); Top expressed in: ganglionic eminence; ventricular zone; superior frontal gyrus; skeletal muscle tissue; corpus callosum; prefrontal cortex; Brodmann area 9; primary visual cortex; cerebellar cortex; cerebellar hemisphere / Top expressed in: primary visual cortex; Rostral migratory stream; substantia nigra; superior frontal gyrus; supraoptic nucleus; ganglionic eminence; dentate gyrus of hippocampal formation granule cell; trigeminal ganglion; olfactory bulb; Region I of hippocampus proper; More reference expression data
BioGPS	n/a
Orthologs
Databases	NCBI: entry; OMA: entry
Species	Human	Mouse
Entrez	9729	212448
Ensembl	ENSG00000189367	ENSMUSG00000004360
UniProt	Q6ZU52	n/a
RefSeq (mRNA)	NM_014702	NM_001162537
RefSeq (protein)	NP_055517	n/a
Location (UCSC)	Chr 6: 127.44 – 127.46 Mb	Chr 10: 29.09 – 29.11 Mb
PubMed search
- Wikidata
View/Edit Human	View/Edit Mouse

This is a conceptual Translation of the gene KIAA0408.

Uncharacterized protein KIAA0408 is a protein encoded in humans by the KIAA0408 gene.

== Gene ==
=== Location and features ===
Gene KIAA0408 is located on chromosome Chr 6orf174, which is considered to be a "complex locus" as it merges two NCBI genes and produces multiple proteins that have no sequence overlap. It has 6 exons, 4 are non-overlapping and 2 are "cassette exons". c6orf174 694 amino acids long.

The mRNA sequence has 8123 nucleotides. c6orf174 contains 20 distinct gt-ag introns and its transcription can produce 14 different mRNAs with three of them being completely unspliced forms. It has seven isoforms. The GeneCard for KIAA0408 is pictured below.

=== Variants and aliases ===
KIAA0408 has at least 11 spliced variants. Aliases include C6orf174andKIAA0408, FLJ43995, RP3-403A15.2,dJ403A15.3, C6orf174, LOC 9729, jajer, barspoyby, gyperbu.1 It has been described as hypothetical protein LOC9729, OTTHUMP00000017174, and hypothetical protein LOC 387104.1 UniProtKB refers to it as K0408_HUMAN,Q6ZU52.

== Expression ==
KIAA0408 appears to be expressed highest in the brain, fat, and lung tissues. KIAA0408 is also associated with the hippocampus which primarily helps with releasing hormones and regulates body temperature. In humans, this gene is expressed in leukocytes, the hypothalamus, glioblastoma cells, prechondrocytes, placental CD14+ giant cells, estrogen receptor alpha-silenced MCF7 breast cancer cells.1 In rats, KIAA0408 is expressed at higher levels in rats eating carbohydrate-whey protein hydrosylate diets in comparison to rats eating carbohydrate amino acid diets. Glioblastoma pseudopalisading cells are associated with necrosis. Based on the second figure, it appears that KIAA0408 is more highly expressed in tumor cells than in pseudopalisading cells.

== Regulation of expression ==
According to the SUMO-sumoylation prediction in ExPASy, it appears that there are four motifs with a high probability of sumoylation. KIAA0408 has one O-glycosylation site predicted at serine 386. The gene has a large amount of predicted phosphorylation sites.

== Protein ==
KIAA0408 has 694 amino acids and a molecular weight of 79.2 kdal. 12.0% of the protein has levels of serine that are higher than average. These results also indicate that at a neutral pH, my protein tends to be more basic. Evidence collected from Expasy suggests that KIAA0408 could potentially be involved in solute. The tertiary structure of KIAA0408 consists largely of coiled-coiled regions. It is predicted with high certainty that KIAA0408 is found in the nucleus. A conceptual translation is included in this page.

== Interacting proteins ==
KIAA0408 has 42 total interacting proteins.

== Orthologs ==
The ortholog space extends from mammals to birds. There are no paralogs.

All birds had very little variation in gene length, % identity, and % similarity. The two turtles that had the gene were also similar in those areas. All mammals aside from the lemur and the monkey had around the same gene lengths, % identity, and % similarity. The lemur and the monkey varied from each other.

Human and mouse KIAA0408 are 53.531% similar and have 149 similar positions. There is a large region that is missing in mouse in the C-terminus, and another smaller chunk missing in the N-terminus. This could be an evolutionary sign of humans' erroneous development of more genes to make them more complex individuals. The areas before and after both deletions are highly conserved, so these are likely very critical regions of the gene.

== Clinical significance ==
KIAA0408 is highly expressed in the brain, but has also been found in tissue of the breast, testes, eye, kidney, and T-lymphocytes, and over 50 other tissues.1 It was found to be upregulated in comparisons between the following clinical features: new tumor/no new tumor, pathologic M1/M0, and presence or absence of cancer.4 The table in the paper is unclear as to which features the upregulation is correlated to.4 KIAA0408 was also listed in a genetic testing registry. This protein can be tested for mutations which would indicate "hereditary disease". There was no specific information provided on what hereditary diseases it can test for. KIAA0408 is also part of a list of gene transcripts "...whose expression levels are positively correlated with age."
