= ECI2 =

Protein-coding gene in the species Homo sapiens

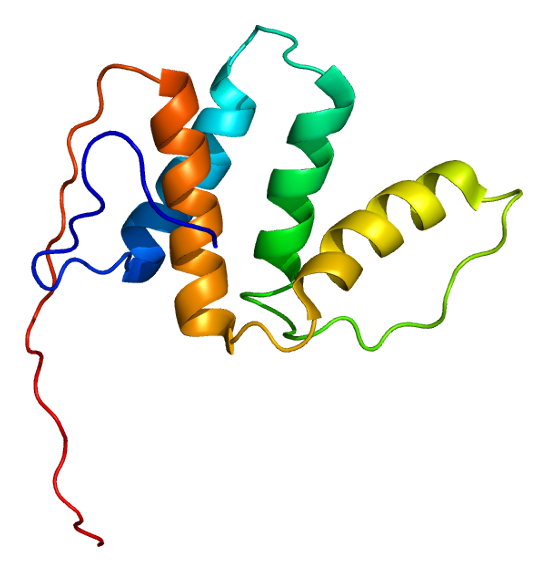
Available structures
PDB	Ortholog search: PDBe RCSB
PDB	List of PDB id codes 2CQU, 2F6Q, 4U18, 4U19, 4U1A

Identifiers
- Aliases: ECI2, ACBD2, DRS-1, DRS1, HCA88, PECI, dJ1013A10.3, enoyl-CoA delta isomerase 2
- External IDs: OMIM: 608024; MGI: 1346064; HomoloGene: 38145; GeneCards: ECI2; OMA:ECI2 - orthologs

Gene location (Human)
Chr.	Chromosome 6 (human)
Band	6p25.2	Start	4,115,693 bp
Band	6p25.2	End	4,135,597 bp

Gene location (Mouse)
Chr.	Chromosome 13 (mouse)
Band	13|13 A3.3	Start	35,161,731 bp
Band	13|13 A3.3	End	35,211,079 bp
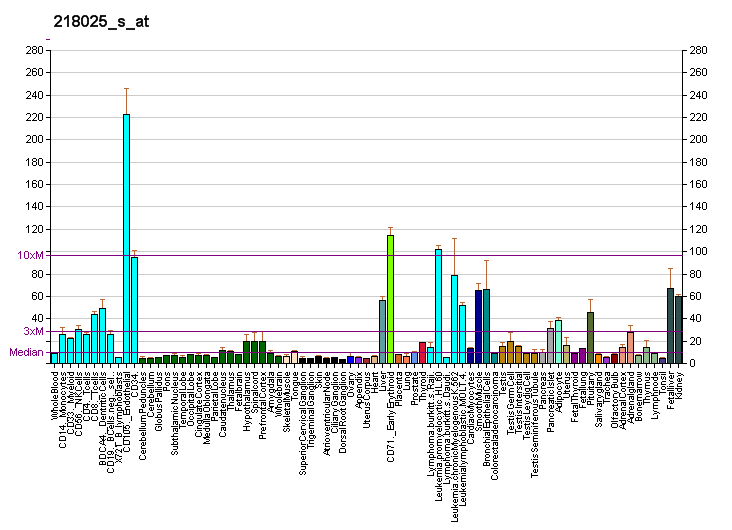
RNA expression pattern
Bgee	Human / Mouse (ortholog); Top expressed in: right adrenal gland; right adrenal cortex; right ventricle; triceps brachii muscle; left adrenal gland; biceps brachii; Skeletal muscle tissue of biceps brachii; glutes; left adrenal cortex; left ventricle / Top expressed in: saccule; otic placode; cardiac muscle tissue of left ventricle; renal corpuscle; otic vesicle; interventricular septum; proximal tubule; hair follicle; ventricular zone; vestibular sensory epithelium; More reference expression data
BioGPS	More reference expression data
Gene ontology
Molecular function	intramolecular oxidoreductase activity, transposing C=C bonds; signaling receptor binding; catalytic activity; isomerase activity; fatty-acyl-CoA binding; dodecenoyl-CoA delta-isomerase activity
Cellular component	membrane; mitochondrion; intracellular membrane-bounded organelle; nucleoplasm; peroxisomal matrix; peroxisome; cytosol
Biological process	fatty acid catabolic process; fatty acid beta-oxidation; metabolism; fatty acid beta-oxidation using acyl-CoA oxidase; protein targeting to peroxisome
Sources:Amigo / QuickGO
Orthologs
Species	Human	Mouse
Entrez	10455	23986
Ensembl	ENSG00000198721	ENSMUSG00000021417
UniProt	O75521	Q9WUR2
RefSeq (mRNA)	NM_001166010; NM_006117; NM_206836	NM_001110331; NM_001110332; NM_011868
RefSeq (protein)	NP_001159482; NP_006108; NP_996667	NP_001103801; NP_035998
Location (UCSC)	Chr 6: 4.12 – 4.14 Mb	Chr 13: 35.16 – 35.21 Mb
PubMed search
- Wikidata
View/Edit Human	View/Edit Mouse

Enoyl-CoA delta isomerase 2, also known as Peroxisomal 3,2-trans-enoyl-CoA isomerase (PECI) is an enzyme that in humans is encoded by the ECI2 gene.

PECI is an auxiliary enzyme that catalyzes an isomerization step required for the beta-oxidation of unsaturated fatty acids.[supplied by OMIM]
