= PCHP =

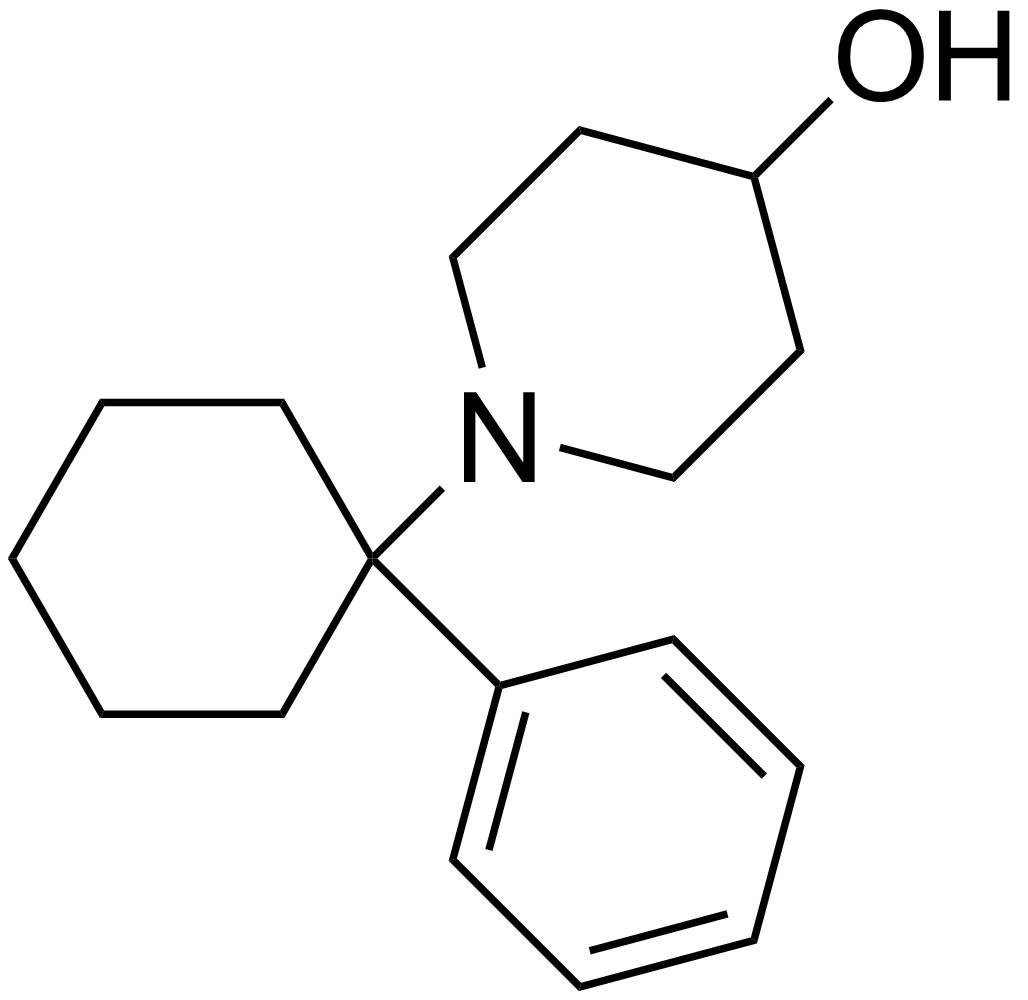

Names
- Preferred IUPAC name 1-(1-Phenylcyclohexyl)piperidin-4-ol
- Other names 4-HO-PCP; 4-Hydroxyphencyclidine

Identifiers
CAS Number	60232-85-1
3D model (JSmol)	Interactive image
ChEMBL	ChEMBL422629
ChemSpider	89272
PubChem CID	98840
UNII	AE1041687F
CompTox Dashboard (EPA)	DTXSID10208979
- InChI: InChI=1S/C17H25NO/c19-16-9-13-18(14-10-16)17(11-5-2-6-12-17)15-7-3-1-4-8-15/h1,3-4,7-8,16,19H,2,5-6,9-14H2 Key: SLUMSLWGPLFKGY-UHFFFAOYSA-N; InChI=1/C17H25NO/c19-16-9-13-18(14-10-16)17(11-5-2-6-12-17)15-7-3-1-4-8-15/h1,3-4,7-8,16,19H,2,5-6,9-14H2 Key: SLUMSLWGPLFKGY-UHFFFAOYAA
- SMILES: OC3CCN(C2(c1ccccc1)CCCCC2)CC3

Properties
Chemical formula	C_{17}H_{25}NO
Molar mass	259.393 g·mol^{−1}
- Except where otherwise noted, data are given for materials in their standard state (at 25 °C [77 °F], 100 kPa). verify (what is ?) Infobox references

1-(1-Phenylcyclohexyl)-4-hydroxypiperidine (PCHP) is a metabolite of phencyclidine (PCP). PCHP can be detected in the hair, urine, stool, sweat, and saliva of PCP users.

== See also ==
- 4-Phenyl-4-(1-piperidinyl)cyclohexanol, another PCP metabolite
