= ECH1 =

Protein-coding gene in the species Homo sapiens

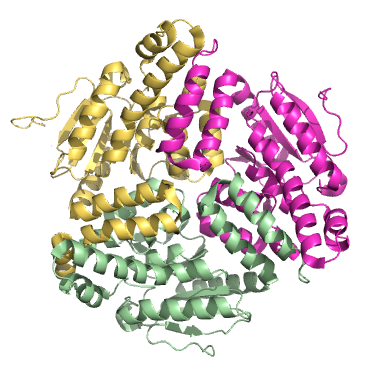
Available structures
PDB	Ortholog search: PDBe RCSB
PDB	List of PDB id codes 2VRE

Identifiers
- Aliases: ECH1, HPXEL, enoyl-CoA hydratase 1, peroxisomal, enoyl-CoA hydratase 1
- External IDs: OMIM: 600696; MGI: 1858208; HomoloGene: 1069; GeneCards: ECH1; OMA:ECH1 - orthologs

Gene location (Human)
Chr.	Chromosome 19 (human)
Band	19q13.2	Start	38,815,422 bp
Band	19q13.2	End	38,831,841 bp

Gene location (Mouse)
Chr.	Chromosome 7 (mouse)
Band	7|7 B1	Start	28,524,642 bp
Band	7|7 B1	End	28,531,672 bp
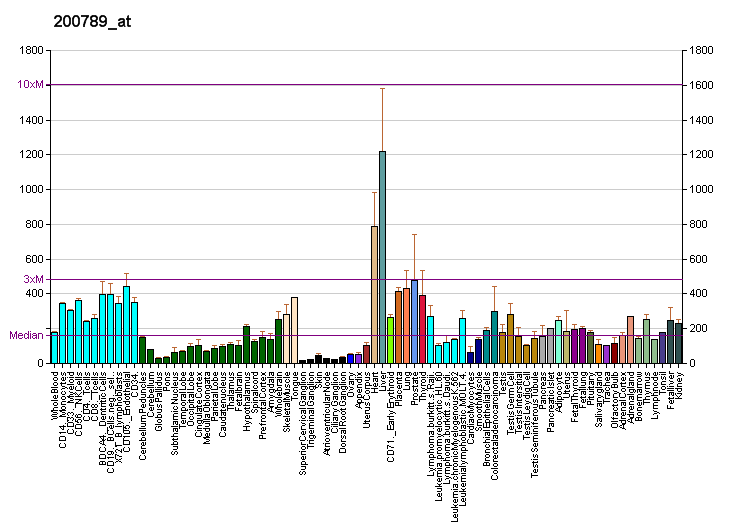
RNA expression pattern
Bgee	Human / Mouse (ortholog); Top expressed in: apex of heart; left ventricle; gastrocnemius muscle; right adrenal gland; left adrenal gland; left adrenal cortex; right adrenal cortex; right auricle of heart; right lobe of liver; mucosa of transverse colon / Top expressed in: right ventricle; myocardium of ventricle; cardiac muscles; brown adipose tissue; interventricular septum; cardiac muscle tissue of left ventricle; right kidney; intercostal muscle; extraocular muscle; white adipose tissue; More reference expression data
BioGPS	More reference expression data
Gene ontology
Molecular function	signaling receptor binding; protein binding; isomerase activity; catalytic activity; delta3,5-delta2,4-dienoyl-CoA isomerase activity
Cellular component	peroxisome; extracellular exosome; membrane; mitochondrion; peroxisomal matrix; cytosol
Biological process	fatty acid beta-oxidation; metabolism; fatty acid metabolic process; lipid metabolism; protein targeting to peroxisome
Sources:Amigo / QuickGO
Orthologs
Species	Human	Mouse
Entrez	1891	51798
Ensembl	ENSG00000104823; ENSG00000282853	ENSMUSG00000053898
UniProt	Q13011	O35459
RefSeq (mRNA)	NM_001398	NM_016772
RefSeq (protein)	NP_001389	NP_058052
Location (UCSC)	Chr 19: 38.82 – 38.83 Mb	Chr 7: 28.52 – 28.53 Mb
PubMed search
- Wikidata
View/Edit Human	View/Edit Mouse

Delta(3,5)-Delta(2,4)-dienoyl-CoA isomerase, mitochondrial is an enzyme that in humans is encoded by the ECH1 gene.

This gene encodes a member of the hydratase/isomerase superfamily. The gene product shows high sequence similarity to enoyl-CoA hydratases of several species, particularly within a conserved domain characteristic of these proteins. The encoded protein, Δ3,5-Δ2,4-dienoyl-CoA isomerase, contains a C-terminal peroxisomal targeting sequence and localizes to peroxisomes. The rat ortholog, which localizes to the matrix of both the peroxisome and mitochondria, can isomerize 3-trans,5-cis-dienoyl-CoA to 2-trans,4-trans-dienoyl-CoA, indicating that it is a delta3,5-delta2,4-dienoyl-CoA isomerase. This enzyme functions in the auxiliary step of the fatty acid beta-oxidation pathway. Expression of the rat gene is induced by peroxisome proliferators.
