= Ethylmalonyl-CoA decarboxylase =

Protein-coding gene in the species Homo sapiens

ECHDC1

Identifiers
- Aliases: ECHDC1, HEL-S-76, MMCD, dJ351K20.2, ethylmalonyl-CoA decarboxylase 1
- External IDs: OMIM: 612136; MGI: 1277169; GeneCards: ECHDC1
Enzyme activity
EC #	BRENDA	ExPASy	KEGG	MetaCyc
4.1.1.94	↗	↗	↗	↗
7.2.4.3	↗	↗	↗	↗

Gene location (Human)
Chr.	Chromosome 6 (human)
Band	6q22.33	Start	127,288,712 bp
Band	6q22.33	End	127,343,609 bp

Gene location (Mouse)
Chr.	Chromosome 10 (mouse)
Band	10 A4|10 16.59 cM	Start	29,189,162 bp
Band	10 A4|10 16.59 cM	End	29,223,465 bp
RNA expression pattern
Bgee	Human / Mouse (ortholog); Top expressed in: retinal pigment epithelium; palpebral conjunctiva; parotid gland; vulva; lower lobe of lung; mucosa of colon; mucosa of sigmoid colon; epithelium of colon; skin of thigh; germinal epithelium / Top expressed in: tunica adventitia of aorta; brown adipose tissue; spermatocyte; intercostal muscle; lip; interventricular septum; white adipose tissue; right kidney; left lobe of liver; subcutaneous adipose tissue; More reference expression data
BioGPS	n/a
Gene ontology
Molecular function	methylmalonyl-CoA decarboxylase activity; catalytic activity; carboxy-lyase activity; lyase activity; enoyl-CoA hydratase activity
Cellular component	cytoplasm; cytosol; mitochondrion
Biological process	metabolism; fatty acid beta-oxidation
Sources:Amigo / QuickGO
Orthologs
Databases	NCBI: entry; OMA: entry
Species	Human	Mouse
Entrez	55862	52665
Ensembl	ENSG00000093144	ENSMUSG00000019883
UniProt	Q9NTX5	Q9D9V3
RefSeq (mRNA)	NM_001002030; NM_001105544; NM_001105545; NM_001139510; NM_018479	NM_001110195; NM_025855
RefSeq (protein)	NP_001002030; NP_001099014; NP_001099015; NP_001132982; NP_060949	NP_001103665; NP_080131
Location (UCSC)	Chr 6: 127.29 – 127.34 Mb	Chr 10: 29.19 – 29.22 Mb
PubMed search
- Wikidata
View/Edit Human	View/Edit Mouse

Ethylmalonyl-CoA decarboxylase

Identifiers
- EC no.: 4.1.1.94

Databases
- BRENDA: enzyme data
- ExPASy: NiceZyme view
- KEGG: enzyme entry
- MetaCyc: metabolic pathway
- Rhea: reactions
- PDB structures: RCSB PDB PDBe PDBsum
Search
- PMC: articles
- PubMed: articles
- NCBI: proteins

Ethylmalonyl-CoA decarboxylase (EC 4.1.1.94) is an enzyme with systematic name (S)-ethylmalonyl-CoA carboxy-lyase (butanoyl-CoA-forming). This enzyme catalyses the following chemical reaction

(S)-ethylmalonyl-CoA $\rightleftharpoons$ butanoyl-CoA + CO_{2}

The vertebrate enzyme decarboxylates ethylmalonyl-CoA.
