= 3-Hydroxyisobutyryl-CoA deacylase deficiency =

Autosomal recessive condition

- Autosomal recessive pattern is the inheritance manner of this condition
- Specialty: Medical genetics

3-Hydroxyisobutyryl-CoA deacylase deficiency is a rare autosomal recessive condition that is associated with severely delayed psychomotor development, neurodegeneration, increased lactic acid and brain lesions in the basal ganglia. Fewer than 10 patients have been described with this condition.

== History ==
This condition was first described in 1982. A clinical review in 2026 describes three subtypes based on the age of the patient.
