= Protein THEMIS =

Protein-coding gene in the species Homo sapiens

THEMIS

Identifiers
- Aliases: THEMIS, C6orf190, C6orf207, GASP, SPOT, TSEPA, bA325O24.3, bA325O24.4, thymocyte selection associated, THEMIS (protein), IPR039671
- External IDs: OMIM: 613607; MGI: 2443552; GeneCards: THEMIS

Gene location (Human)
Chr.	Chromosome 6 (human)
Band	6q22.33	Start	127,708,072 bp
Band	6q22.33	End	127,918,631 bp

Gene location (Mouse)
Chr.	Chromosome 10 (mouse)
Band	10|10 A4	Start	28,544,356 bp
Band	10|10 A4	End	28,759,814 bp
RNA expression pattern
Bgee	Human / Mouse (ortholog); Top expressed in: lymph node; granulocyte; testicle; appendix; blood; primary visual cortex; epithelium of colon; superior frontal gyrus; prefrontal cortex; tonsil / Top expressed in: thymus; blood; lymph node; mesenteric lymph nodes; oocyte; subcutaneous adipose tissue; primary oocyte; secondary oocyte; spleen; zygote; More reference expression data
BioGPS	n/a
Gene ontology
Molecular function	protein binding
Cellular component	cytoplasm; COP9 signalosome; nucleus; cell-cell junction
Biological process	multicellular organism development; T cell receptor signaling pathway; adaptive immune response; negative T cell selection; positive T cell selection; immune system process
Sources:Amigo / QuickGO
Orthologs
Databases	NCBI: entry; OMA: entry
Species	Human	Mouse
Entrez	387357	210757
Ensembl	ENSG00000275122; ENSG00000172673	ENSMUSG00000049109
UniProt	Q8N1K5	Q8BGW0
RefSeq (mRNA)	NM_001010923; NM_001164685; NM_001164687; NM_001318531; NM_001394520 NM_001394521; NM_001394522	NM_178666; NM_001305663; NM_001374699
RefSeq (protein)	NP_001010923; NP_001158157; NP_001158159; NP_001305460	NP_001292592; NP_848781; NP_001361628
Location (UCSC)	Chr 6: 127.71 – 127.92 Mb	Chr 10: 28.54 – 28.76 Mb
PubMed search
- Wikidata
View/Edit Human	View/Edit Mouse

Protein THEMIS is a protein encoded by the eponymous THEMIS gene.

== Function ==
This protein plays a regulatory role in both positive and negative T cell selection during late thymocyte development. The protein functions through T-cell antigen receptor signaling, and is necessary for proper lineage commitment and maturation of T-cells. Changes in THEMIS gene expression due to the rs138300818 variant promote the development of early-onset type 1 diabetes.

== Etymology ==
THEMIS is an acronym for thymocyte-expressed molecule involved in selection. Themis is also the name of a Titan in Greek mythology who weighed the fates of humans, an apt choice since the protein is important in deciding the fate of the T cell during development.
