= P2X purinoreceptor =

Group of ion channel proteins

ATP P2X receptor
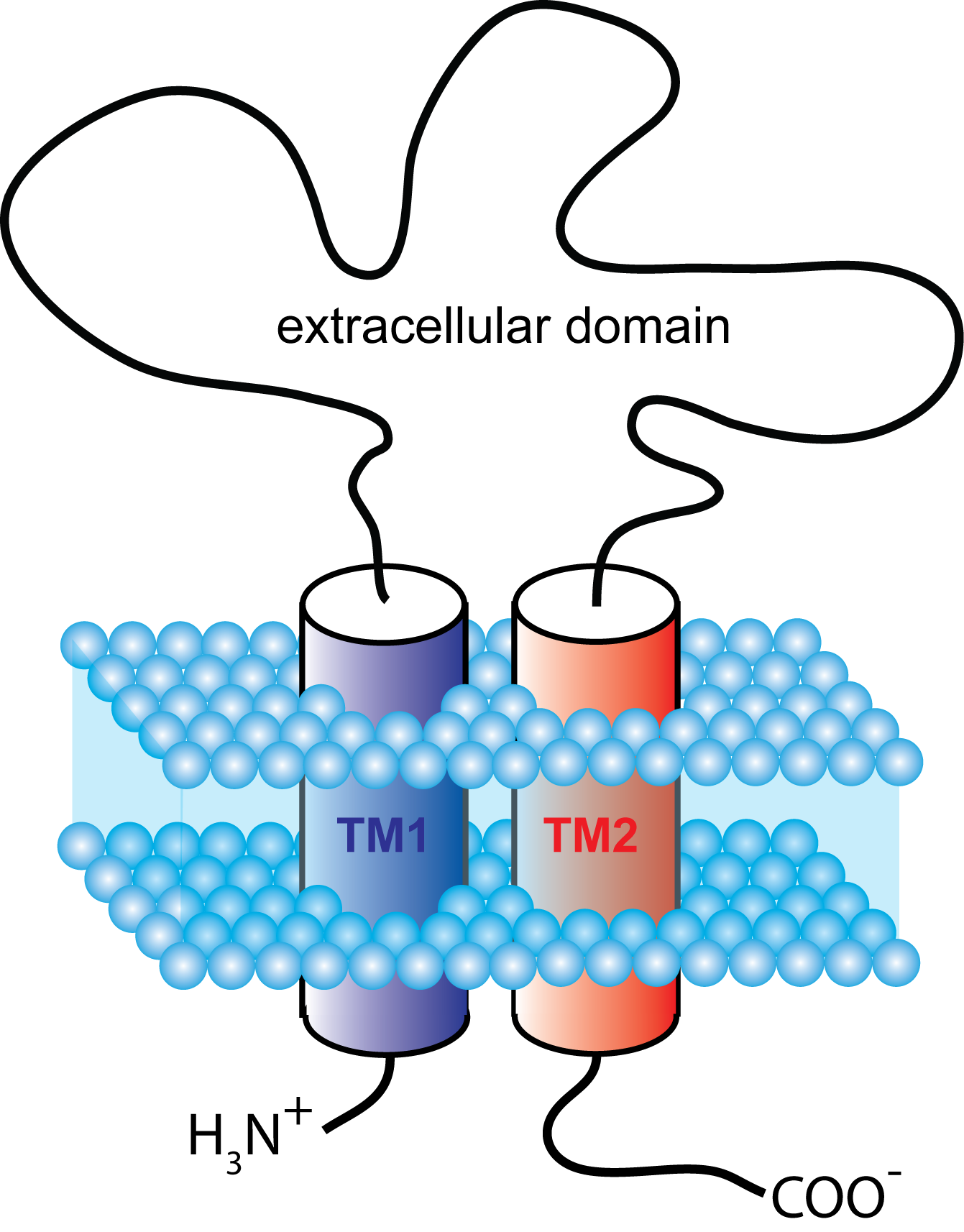
- Figure 1. Schematic representation showing the membrane topology of a typical P2X receptor subunit. First and second transmembrane domains are labeled TM1 and TM2.

Identifiers
- Symbol: P2X_receptor
- Pfam: PF00864
- InterPro: IPR001429
- PROSITE: PDOC00932
- TCDB: 1.A.7
- OPM superfamily: 181
- OPM protein: 3h9v
Available protein structures:
- PDB: IPR001429 PF00864 (ECOD; PDBsum)
- AlphaFold: IPR001429; PF00864

The P2X receptors, also ATP-gated P2X receptor cation channel family, is a protein family that consists of cation-permeable ligand-gated ion channels that open in response to the binding of extracellular adenosine 5'-triphosphate (ATP). They belong to a larger family of receptors known as the ENaC/P2X superfamily. ENaC and P2X receptors have similar 3-D structures and are homologous. P2X receptors are present in a diverse array of organisms including humans, mouse, rat, rabbit, chicken, zebrafish, bullfrog, fluke, and amoeba.

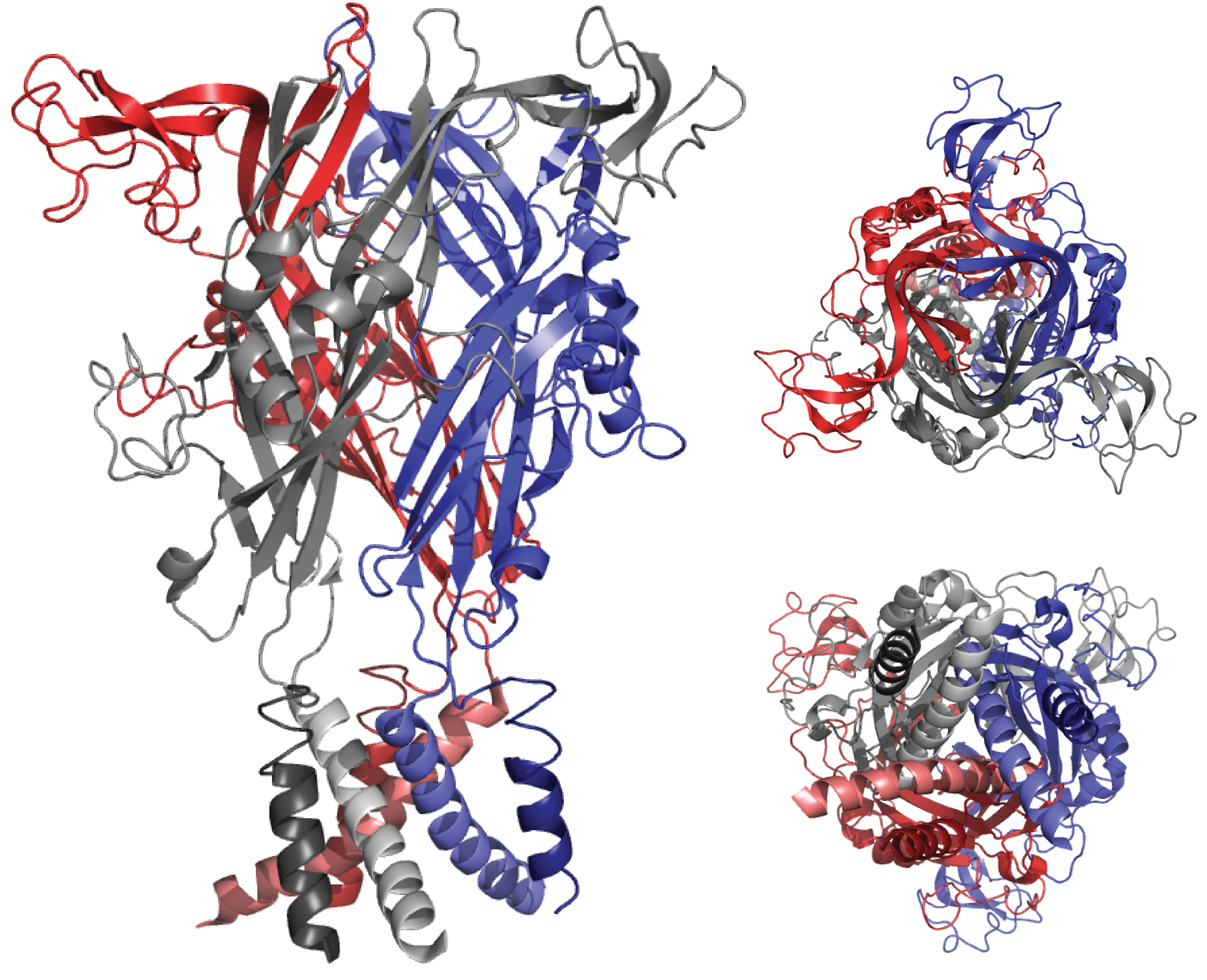
Figure 2. Crystal structure of the zebrafish P2X_{4} receptor (deltaP2X4-B) channel as viewed from the side (left), extracellular (top right), and intracellular (bottom right) perspectives(PDB: 3I5D)

== Physiological roles ==
P2X receptors are involved in a variety of physiological processes, including:

- Modulation of cardiac rhythm and contractility
- Modulation of vascular tone
- Mediation of nociception, especially chronic pain
- Contraction of the vas deferens during ejaculation
- Contraction of the urinary bladder during micturition
- Platelet aggregation
- Macrophage activation
- Apoptosis
- Neuronal-glial integration

== Tissue distribution ==
P2X receptors are expressed in cells from a wide variety of animal tissues. On presynaptic and postsynaptic nerve terminals and glial cells throughout the central, peripheral and autonomic nervous systems, P2X receptors have been shown to modulate synaptic transmission. Furthermore, P2X receptors are able to initiate contraction in cells of the heart muscle, skeletal muscle, and various smooth muscle tissues, including that of the vasculature, vas deferens and urinary bladder. P2X receptors are also expressed on leukocytes, including lymphocytes and macrophages, and are present on blood platelets. There is some degree of subtype specificity as to which P2X receptor subtypes are expressed on specific cell types, with P2X_{1} receptors being particularly prominent in smooth muscle cells, and P2X_{2} being widespread throughout the autonomic nervous system. However, such trends are very general and there is considerable overlap in subunit distribution, with most cell types expressing more than one subunits. For example, P2X_{2} and P2X_{3} subunits are commonly found co-expressed in sensory neurons, where they often co-assemble into functional P2X_{2/3} receptors.

== Basic structure and nomenclature ==
To date, seven separate genes coding for P2X subunits have been identified, and named as P2X_{1} through P2X_{7}, based on their pharmacological properties.

receptor subtype	HGNC gene name	chromosomal location
P2X_{1}	P2RX1	17p13.3
P2X_{2}	P2RX2	12q24.33
P2X_{3}	P2RX3	11q12
P2X_{4}	P2RX4	12q24.32
P2X_{5}	P2RX5	17p13.3
P2X_{6}	P2RX6	22p11.21
P2X_{7}	P2RX7	12q24.31

The proteins of the P2X receptors are quite similar in sequence (>35% identity), but they possess 380-1000 amino acyl residues per subunit with variability in length. The subunits all share a common topology, possessing two transmembrane domains (one about 30-50 residues from their N-termini, the other near residues 320-340), a large extracellular loop and intracellular carboxyl and amino termini (Figure 1) The extracellular receptor domains between these two segments (of about 270 residues) are well conserved with several conserved glycyl residues and 10 conserved cysteyl residues. The amino termini contain a consensus site for protein kinase C phosphorylation, indicating that the phosphorylation state of P2X subunits may be involved in receptor functioning. Additionally, there is a great deal of variability (25 to 240 residues) in the C termini, indicating that they might serve subunit specific properties.

Generally speaking, most subunits can form functional homomeric or heteromeric receptors. Receptor nomenclature dictates that naming is determined by the constituent subunits; e.g. a homomeric P2X receptor made up of only P2X_{1} subunits is called a P2X_{1} receptor, and a heteromeric receptor containing P2X_{2} and P2X_{3} subunits is called a P2X_{2/3} receptor. The general consensus is that P2X_{6} cannot form a functional homomeric receptor and that P2X_{7} cannot form a functional heteromeric receptor.

Topologically, they resemble the epithelial Na^{+} channel proteins in possessing (a) N- and C-termini localized intracellularly, (b) two putative transmembrane segments, (c) a large extracellular loop domain, and (d) many conserved extracellular cysteyl residues. P2X receptor channels transport small monovalent cations, although some also transport Ca^{2+}.

Evidence from early molecular biological and functional studies has strongly indicated that the functional P2X receptor protein is a trimer, with the three peptide subunits arranged around an ion-permeable channel pore. This view was recently confirmed by the use of X-ray crystallography to resolve the three-dimensional structure of the zebrafish P2X_{4} receptor(Figure 2). These findings indicate that the second transmembrane domain of each subunit lines the ion-conducting pore and is therefore responsible for channel gating.

The relationship between the structure and function of P2X receptors has been the subject of considerable research using site-directed mutagenesis and chimeric channels, and key protein domains responsible for regulating ATP binding, ion permeation, pore dilation and desensitization have been identified.

== Activation and channel opening ==
Three ATP molecules are thought to be required to activate a P2X receptor, suggesting that ATP needs to bind to each of the three subunits in order to open the channel pore, though recent evidence suggests that ATP binds at the three subunit interfaces. Once ATP binds to the extracellular loop of the P2X receptor, it evokes a conformational change in the structure of the ion channel that results in the opening of the ion-permeable pore. The most commonly accepted theory of channel opening involves the rotation and separation of the second transmembrane domain (TM) helices, allowing cations such as Na^{+} and Ca^{2+} to access the ion-conducting pore through three lateral fenestrations above the TM domains. The entry of cations leads to the depolarization of the cell membrane and the activation of various Ca^{2+}-sensitive intracellular processes. The channel opening time is dependent upon the subunit makeup of the receptor. For example, P2X_{1} and P2X_{3} receptors desensitize rapidly (a few hundred milliseconds) in the continued presence of ATP, whereas the P2X_{2} receptor channel remains open for as long as ATP is bound to it.

=== Transport reaction ===
The generalized transport reaction is:

Monovalent cations or Ca^{2+} (out) ⇌ monovalent cations or Ca^{2+} (in)

== Pharmacology ==
The pharmacology of a given P2X receptor is largely determined by its subunit makeup. Different subunits exhibit different sensitivities to purinergic agonists such as ATP, α,β-meATP and BzATP; and antagonists such as pyridoxalphosphate-6-azophenyl-2',4'-disulfonic acid (PPADS) and suramin. Of continuing interest is the fact that some P2X receptors (P2X_{2}, P2X_{4}, human P2X_{5}, and P2X_{7}) exhibit multiple open states in response to ATP, characterized by a time-dependent increase in the permeabilities of large organic ions such as N-methyl-D-glucamine (NMDG^{+}) and nucleotide binding dyes such as propidium iodide (YO-PRO-1). Whether this change in permeability is due to a widening of the P2X receptor channel pore itself or the opening of a separate ion-permeable pore is the subject of continued investigation.

== Synthesis and trafficking ==
P2X receptors are synthesized in the rough endoplasmic reticulum. After complex glycosylation in the Golgi apparatus, they are transported to the plasma membrane, whereby docking is achieved through specific members of the SNARE protein family. A YXXXK motif in the C terminus is common to all P2X subunits and seems to be important for trafficking and stabilization of P2X receptors in the membrane. Removal of P2X receptors occurs via clathrin-mediated endocytosis of receptors to endosomes where they are sorted into vesicles for degradation or recycling.

== Allosteric modulation ==
The sensitivity of P2X receptors to ATP is strongly modulated by changes in extracellular pH and by the presence of heavy metals (e.g. zinc and cadmium). For example, the ATP sensitivity of P2X_{1}, P2X_{3} and P2X_{4} receptors is attenuated when the extracellular pH<7, whereas the ATP sensitivity of P2X_{2} is significantly increased. On the other hand, zinc potentiates ATP-gated currents through P2X_{2}, P2X_{3} and P2X_{4}, and inhibits currents through P2X_{1}. The allosteric modulation of P2X receptors by pH and metals appears to be conferred by the presence of histidine side chains in the extracellular domain. In contrast to the other members of the P2X receptor family, P2X_{4} receptors are also very sensitive to modulation by the macrocyclic lactone, ivermectin. Ivermectin potentiates ATP-gated currents through P2X_{4} receptors by increasing the open probability of the channel in the presence of ATP, which it appears to do by interacting with the transmembrane domains from within the lipid bilayer.

== Subfamilies ==
- P2RX1 InterPro: IPR003044
- P2RX2 InterPro: IPR003045
- P2RX3 InterPro: IPR003046
- P2RX4 InterPro: IPR003047
- P2RX5 InterPro: IPR003048
- P2RX6 InterPro: IPR003049
- P2RX7 InterPro: IPR003050

== Human proteins containing this domain ==
P2RX1; P2RX2; P2RX3; P2RX4; P2RX5; P2RX7; P2RXL1; TAX1BP3

== See also ==
- Ligand-gated ion channels
