= P2RX7 =

Protein-coding gene in the species Homo sapiens

Identifiers
- Aliases: P2RX7, P2X7, purinergic receptor P2X 7
- External IDs: OMIM: 602566; MGI: 1339957; GeneCards: P2RX7

Gene location (Human)
Chr.	Chromosome 12 (human)
Band	12q24.31	Start	121,132,819 bp
Band	12q24.31	End	121,188,032 bp

Gene location (Mouse)
Chr.	Chromosome 5 (mouse)
Band	5|5 F	Start	122,781,974 bp
Band	5|5 F	End	122,829,495 bp
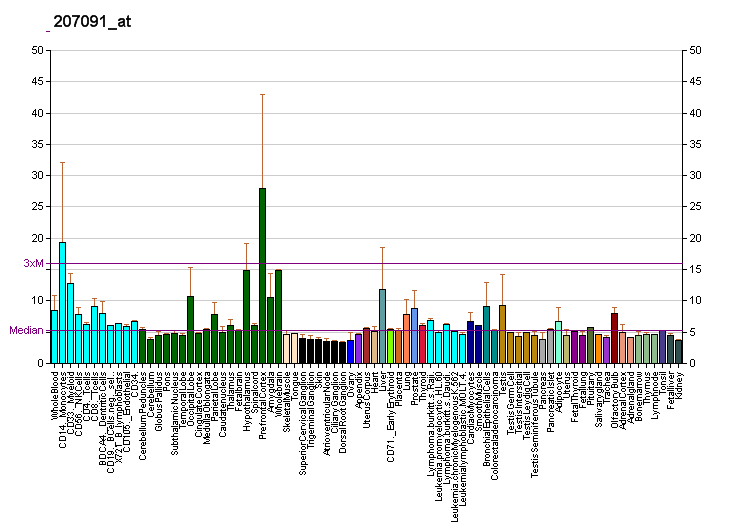
RNA expression pattern
Bgee	Human / Mouse (ortholog); Top expressed in: inferior ganglion of vagus nerve; endothelial cell; corpus callosum; monocyte; subthalamic nucleus; superior vestibular nucleus; ventral tegmental area; globus pallidus; internal globus pallidus; optic nerve / Top expressed in: right ventricle; perirhinal cortex; lip; esophagus; entorhinal cortex; choroid plexus of fourth ventricle; dentate gyrus of hippocampal formation granule cell; lumbar subsegment of spinal cord; embryo; primary visual cortex; More reference expression data
BioGPS	More reference expression data
Gene ontology
Molecular function	signaling receptor binding; ATP binding; lipopolysaccharide binding; purinergic nucleotide receptor activity; protein homodimerization activity; channel activity; protein binding; ion channel activity; extracellularly ATP-gated cation channel activity; signaling receptor activity
Cellular component	cytoplasm; membrane; cell-cell junction; synapse; integral component of membrane; neuromuscular junction; plasma membrane; soma; bleb; integral component of nuclear inner membrane; integral component of plasma membrane; presynapse; external side of plasma membrane; postsynapse
Biological process	cellular response to extracellular stimulus; positive regulation of protein phosphorylation; positive regulation of calcium ion transport into cytosol; regulation of sodium ion transport; NAD transport; response to zinc ion; positive regulation of catalytic activity; response to organic substance; phospholipid transfer to membrane; T cell homeostasis; positive regulation of cytolysis; protein phosphorylation; cell surface receptor signaling pathway; membrane protein ectodomain proteolysis; phospholipid translocation; positive regulation of interleukin-1 beta production; apoptotic signaling pathway; positive regulation of gamma-aminobutyric acid secretion; calcium ion transport; defense response to Gram-positive bacterium; extrinsic apoptotic signaling pathway; synaptic vesicle exocytosis; ceramide biosynthetic process; response to mechanical stimulus; ion transport; reactive oxygen species metabolic process; phagolysosome assembly; regulation of killing of cells of other organism; positive regulation of prostaglandin secretion; positive regulation of interleukin-6 production; inflammatory response; plasma membrane organization; positive regulation of ion transmembrane transport; positive regulation of MAPK cascade; negative regulation of bone resorption; release of sequestered calcium ion into cytosol; cell volume homeostasis; cytolysis; plasma membrane phospholipid scrambling; positive regulation of lymphocyte apoptotic process; positive regulation of bone mineralization; skeletal system morphogenesis; cellular response to organic cyclic compound; membrane depolarization; mitochondrion organization; positive regulation of T cell mediated cytotoxicity; bleb assembly; collagen metabolic process; negative regulation of cell volume; pore complex assembly; response to electrical stimulus; cation transport; positive regulation of ossification; cation transmembrane transport; response to fluid shear stress; response to calcium ion; response to lipopolysaccharide; positive regulation of mitochondrial depolarization; vesicle budding from membrane; negative regulation of MAPK cascade; positive regulation of protein secretion; homeostasis of number of cells within a tissue; sensory perception of pain; positive regulation of bleb assembly; response to ATP; gene expression; response to bacterium; response to organic cyclic compound; programmed cell death; protein processing; cellular response to dsRNA; T cell proliferation; positive regulation of gene expression; protein complex oligomerization; positive regulation of glutamate secretion; cell morphogenesis; positive regulation of cytoskeleton organization; positive regulation of apoptotic process; positive regulation of glycolytic process; purinergic nucleotide receptor signaling pathway; blood coagulation; excitatory postsynaptic potential; protein catabolic process
Sources:Amigo / QuickGO
Orthologs
Databases	NCBI: entry; OMA: entry
Species	Human	Mouse
Entrez	5027	18439
Ensembl	ENSG00000089041	ENSMUSG00000029468
UniProt	Q99572	Q9Z1M0
RefSeq (mRNA)	NM_002562; NM_177427	NM_001038839; NM_001038845; NM_001038887; NM_001284402; NM_011027
RefSeq (protein)	NP_002553	NP_001033928; NP_001033934; NP_001033976; NP_001271331; NP_035157
Location (UCSC)	Chr 12: 121.13 – 121.19 Mb	Chr 5: 122.78 – 122.83 Mb
PubMed search
- Wikidata
View/Edit Human	View/Edit Mouse

P2X purinoceptor 7 is a protein that in humans is encoded by the P2RX7 gene.

The product of this gene belongs to the family of purinoceptors for ATP. Multiple alternatively spliced variants which would encode different isoforms have been identified although some fit nonsense-mediated decay criteria.

The receptor is found in the central and peripheral nervous systems, in microglia, in macrophages, in uterine endometrium, and in the retina. The P2X_{7} receptor also serves as a pattern recognition receptor for extracellular ATP-mediated apoptotic cell death, regulation of receptor trafficking, mast cell degranulation, and inflammation. Regarding inflammation, P2X7 receptor induces the NLRP3 inflammasome in myeloid cells and leads to interleukin-1beta release.

== Structure and kinetics ==
The P2X_{7} subunits can form homomeric receptors only with a typical P2X receptor structure. The P2X_{7} receptor is a ligand-gated cation channel that opens in response to ATP binding and leads to cell depolarization. The P2X_{7} receptor requires higher levels of ATP than other P2X receptors; however, the response can be potentiated by reducing the concentration of divalent cations such as calcium or magnesium. Continued binding leads to increased permeability to N-methyl-D-glucamine (NMDG^{+}). P2X_{7} receptors do not become desensitized readily and continued signaling leads to the aforementioned increased permeability and an increase in current amplitude.

== Pharmacology ==
=== Agonists ===
- P2X_{7} receptors respond to BzATP more readily than ATP.
- ADP and AMP are weak agonists of P2X_{7} receptors, but a brief exposure to ATP can increase their effectiveness.
- Glutathione has been proposed to act as a P2X_{7} receptor agonist when present at millimolar levels, inducing calcium transients and GABA release from retinal cells.

=== Antagonists ===
- The P2X_{7} receptor current can be blocked by zinc, calcium, magnesium, and copper.
- P2X_{7} receptors are sensitive to pyridoxalphosphate-6-azophenyl-2',4'-disulphonic acid (PPADS) and relatively insensitive to suramin, but the suramin analog, NF279, is much more effective.
- Oxidized ATP (OxATP) and Brilliant Blue G has also been used for blocking P2X_{7} in inflammation.
- Other blockers include the large organic cations calmidazolium (a calmodulin antagonist) and KN-62 (a CaM kinase II antagonist).
- JNJ-54175446 and JNJ-55308942 are selective antagonists

== Receptor trafficking ==
In microglia, P2X_{7} receptors are found mostly on the cell surface. Conserved cysteine residues located in the carboxyl terminus seem to be important for receptor trafficking to the cell membrane. These receptors are upregulated in response to peripheral nerve injury.

In melanocytic cells P2X_{7} gene expression may be regulated by MITF.

== Recruitment of pannexin ==
Activation of the P2X_{7} receptor by ATP leads to recruitment of pannexin pores which allow small molecules such as ATP to leak out of cells. This allows further activation of purinergic receptors and physiological responses such a spreading cytoplasmic waves of calcium. Moreover, this could be responsible for ATP-dependent lysis of macrophages through the formation of membrane pores permeable to larger molecules.

== Clinical significance ==
=== Inflammation ===
On T cells activation of P2X_{7} receptors can activate the T cells or cause T cell differentiation, can affect T cell migration or (at high extracellular levels of ATP and/or NAD+) can induce cell death. The CD38 enzyme on B lymphocytes and macrophages reduces extracellular NAD+, promoting the survival of T cells.

=== Neuropathic pain ===
Microglial P2X_{7} receptors are thought to be involved in neuropathic pain because blockade or deletion of P2X_{7} receptors results in decreased responses to pain, as demonstrated in vivo. Moreover, P2X_{7} receptor signaling increases the release of proinflammatory molecules such as IL-1β, IL-6, and TNF-α. In addition, P2X_{7} receptors have been linked to increases in proinflammatory cytokines such as CXCL2 and CCL3. P2X_{7} receptors are also linked to P2X_{4} receptors, which are also associated with neuropathic pain mediated by microglia.

=== Osteoporosis ===
Mutations in this gene have been associated to low lumbar spine bone mineral density and accelerated bone loss in post-menopausal women.

=== Diabetes ===
The ATP/P2X7R pathway may trigger T-cell attacks on the pancreas, rendering it unable to produce insulin. This autoimmune response may be an early mechanism by which the onset of diabetes is caused.

== Research ==
=== Possible link to hepatic fibrosis ===
One study in mice showed that blockade of P2X7 receptors attenuates onset of liver fibrosis.

== See also ==
- Purinergic receptor
- P2X receptor
