= P2RX4 =

Protein-coding gene in the species Homo sapiens

Identifiers
- Aliases: P2RX4, P2X4, P2X4R, purinergic receptor P2X 4
- External IDs: OMIM: 600846; MGI: 1338859; GeneCards: P2RX4

Gene location (Human)
Chr.	Chromosome 12 (human)
Band	12q24.31	Start	121,210,065 bp
Band	12q24.31	End	121,234,106 bp

Gene location (Mouse)
Chr.	Chromosome 5 (mouse)
Band	5 F|5 62.53 cM	Start	122,845,607 bp
Band	5 F|5 62.53 cM	End	122,867,801 bp
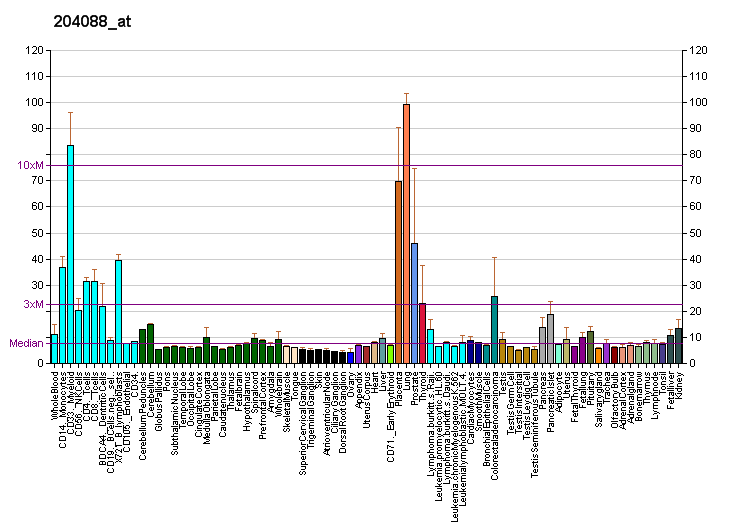
RNA expression pattern
Bgee	Human / Mouse (ortholog); Top expressed in: mucosa of transverse colon; cerebellar hemisphere; right hemisphere of cerebellum; granulocyte; body of pancreas; mucosa of ileum; monocyte; rectum; stromal cell of endometrium; mucosa of sigmoid colon / Top expressed in: Ileal epithelium; lesser wing of sphenoid bone; parotid gland; nasal septum; submandibular gland; lacrimal gland; stroma of bone marrow; left colon; yolk sac; decidua; More reference expression data
BioGPS	More reference expression data
Gene ontology
Molecular function	protein homodimerization activity; zinc ion binding; cadherin binding; purinergic nucleotide receptor activity; extracellularly ATP-gated cation channel activity; ion channel activity; protein binding; copper ion binding; signaling receptor binding; ATP binding; identical protein binding
Cellular component	integral component of membrane; membrane; postsynaptic density; dendritic spine; integral component of nuclear inner membrane; synapse; integral component of plasma membrane; lysosomal membrane; cell junction; soma; terminal bouton; axon; dendrite; perinuclear region of cytoplasm; extracellular exosome; plasma membrane; postsynapse
Biological process	response to ATP; positive regulation of calcium-mediated signaling; positive regulation of calcium ion transport into cytosol; negative regulation of cardiac muscle hypertrophy; regulation of sodium ion transport; positive regulation of nitric oxide biosynthetic process; membrane depolarization; endothelial cell activation; ion transport; cation transmembrane transport; response to fluid shear stress; regulation of blood pressure; ion transmembrane transport; positive regulation of prostaglandin secretion; tissue homeostasis; apoptotic signaling pathway; sensory perception of pain; regulation of cardiac muscle contraction; cellular response to ATP; protein homooligomerization; relaxation of cardiac muscle; signal transduction; neuronal action potential; purinergic nucleotide receptor signaling pathway; positive regulation of calcium ion transport; blood coagulation; excitatory postsynaptic potential; positive regulation of blood vessel endothelial cell migration; positive regulation of endothelial cell chemotaxis; transport
Sources:Amigo / QuickGO
Orthologs
Databases	NCBI: entry; OMA: entry
Species	Human	Mouse
Entrez	5025	18438
Ensembl	ENSG00000135124	ENSMUSG00000029470
UniProt	Q99571	Q9JJX6
RefSeq (mRNA)	NM_001256796; NM_001261397; NM_001261398; NM_002560; NM_175567 NM_175568	NM_011026; NM_001310718; NM_001310720
RefSeq (protein)	NP_001243725; NP_001248326; NP_001248327; NP_002551	n/a
Location (UCSC)	Chr 12: 121.21 – 121.23 Mb	Chr 5: 122.85 – 122.87 Mb
PubMed search
- Wikidata
View/Edit Human	View/Edit Mouse

P2X purinoceptor 4 is a protein that in humans is encoded by the P2RX4 gene. P2X purinoceptor 4 is a member of the P2X receptor family. P2X receptors are trimeric protein complexes that can be homomeric or heteromeric. These receptors are ligand-gated cation channels that open in response to ATP binding. Each receptor subtype, determined by the subunit composition, varies in its affinity to ATP and desensitization kinetics.

The P2X_{4} receptor is the homotrimer composed of three P2X_{4} monomers. They are nonselective cation channels with high calcium permeability, leading to the depolarization of the cell membrane and the activation of various Ca^{2+}-sensitive intracellular processes. The P2X_{4} receptor is uniquely expressed on lysosomal compartments as well as the cell surface.

The receptor is found in the central and peripheral nervous systems, in the epithelia of ducted glands and airways, in the smooth muscle of the bladder, gastrointestinal tract, uterus, and arteries, in uterine endometrium, and in fat cells. P2X_{4} receptors have been implicated in the regulation of cardiac function, ATP-mediated cell death, synaptic strengthening, and activating of the inflammasome in response to injury.

== Structure ==
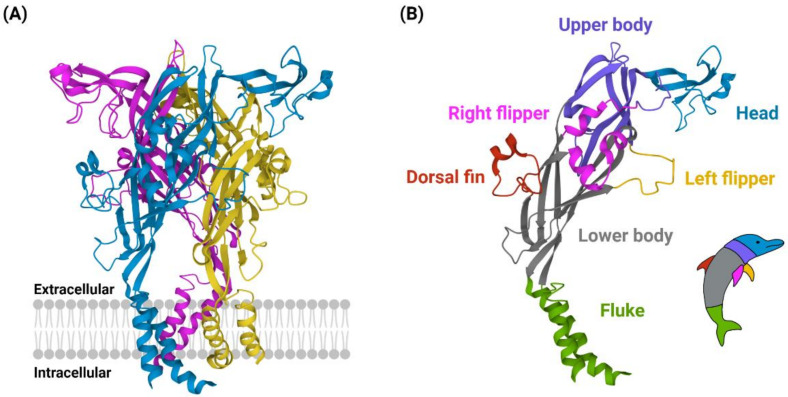
Ribbon structures of (A) the P2X4 homotrimeric receptor and (B) the subunit monomer

P2X receptors are composed of three subunits that can be homomeric or heteromeric by nature. In mammals, there are seven different subunits, each encoded in a different gene (P2RX1-P2RX7). Each subunit has two transmembrane alpha helices (TM1 and TM2) linked by a large extracellular loop. Analysis of x-ray crystallographic structures revealed a 'dolphin-like' tertiary structure, where the 'tail' is embedded in the phospholipid bilayer and the upper and lower ectodomains form the 'head' and 'body' respectively. Adjacent interfaces of the subunits form a deep binding pocket for ATP. ATP binding to these orthosteric sites causes a shift in conformation opening the channel pore.

The P2X_{4} subunits can form homomeric or heteromeric receptors. In 2009, the first purinergic receptor crystallized was the closed state homomeric zebrafish P2X_{4} receptor. Although truncated at its N- and C- termini, this crystal structure resolved and confirmed that these proteins were indeed trimers with an ectodomain rich with disulfide bonds.

== Gating mechanism ==
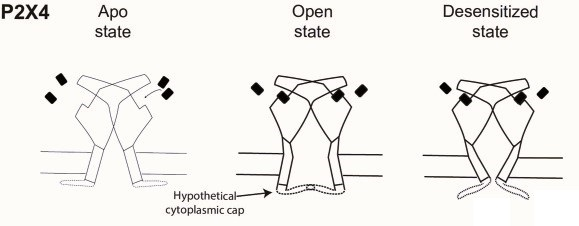
Schematic of the P2X4 receptor conformational states

P2X receptors have three confirmed conformational states: ATP-unbound closed, ATP-bound open, and ATP-bound desensitized. Imaging of the human P2X_{3} and rat P2X_{7} receptors has revealed structural similarities and differences in their cytoplasmic domains. In the ATP-bound state, both receptor types form beta sheet structures from N- and C- termini of adjacent subunits. These newly folded secondary structures come together to form a 'cytoplasmic cap' that helps stabilize the open pore. Crystal structures of the desensitized receptor no longer exhibit the cytoplasmic cap.

=== Desensitization ===
Electrophysiology studies have revealed differences in the rates of receptor desensitization between different P2X subtypes. Homotrimers P2X_{1} and P2X_{3} are the fastest, with desensitization observed milliseconds after activation, while P2X_{2} and P2X_{4} receptors are on the timescale of seconds. Notably, the P2X_{7} receptor uniquely does not undergo desensitization. Mutational studies working with the rat P2X_{2} and P2X_{3} receptors have identified three residues in the N-terminus that majorly contribute to these differences. By changing the amino acids in the P2X_{3} to match the analogous P2X_{2}, the desensitization rate slowed down. Conversely, changing residues of P2X_{2} to match P2X_{3} increased the desensitization rate. In combination with the open state crystal structures, it was hypothesized that the cytoplasmic cap was stabilizing the open pore conformation.

Additionally, structural analysis of the open P2X_{3} receptor revealed transient changes in TM2, the transmembrane alpha helix lining the pore. While in the open state conformation, a small mid-region of TM2 develops into a 3_{10}-helix. This helical structure disappears with desensitization and instead TM2 reforms as a complete alpha helix repositioned closer to the extracellular side.

The helical recoil model uses the observed structural changes in TM2 and the transient formation of the cytoplasmic cap to describe a possible mechanism for the desensitization of P2X receptors. In this model, it is theorized that the cytoplasmic cap fixes the intracellular end of the TM2 helix while stretching its extracellular end to allow ion influx. This would induce the observed 3_{10}-helix. The cap then disassembles and releases its hold on TM2 causing the helix to recoil towards the outer leaflet of the membrane.

In support of this theory, the P2X_{7} uniquely has a large cytoplasmic domain with palmitoylated C-cysteine anchor sites. These sites further stabilize its cytoplasmic cap by anchoring the domain into the surrounding inner leaflet. Mutations of the associated palmitoylation site residues cause observed atypical desensitization of the receptor.

== Receptor trafficking ==
P2X_{4} receptors are functionally expressed on both the cell surface and in lysosomes. Although preferentially localized and stored in lysosomes, P2X_{4} receptors are brought to the cell surface in response to extracellular signals. These signals include IFN-γ, CCL21, CCL2. Fibronectin is also involved in upregulation of P2X_{4} receptors through interactions with integrins that lead to the activation of SRC-family kinase member, Lyn. Lyn then activates PI3K-AKT and MEK-ERK signaling pathways to stimulate receptor trafficking. Internalization of P2X_{4} receptors is clathrin- and dynamin-dependent endocytosis.

== Pharmacology ==
=== Agonists ===
P2X_{4} receptors respond to ATP, but not αβmeATP. These receptors are also potentiated by ivermectin, cibacron blue, and zinc.

=== Antagonists ===
The main pharmacological distinction between the members of the purinoceptor family is the relative sensitivity to the antagonists suramin and pyridoxalphosphate-6-azophenyl-2',4'-disulphonic acid (PPADS). The product of this gene has the lowest sensitivity for these antagonists

== Neuropathic pain ==
The P2X_{4} receptor has been linked to neuropathic pain mediated by microglia in vitro and in vivo. P2X_{4} receptors are upregulated following injury. This upregulation allows for increased activation of p38 mitogen-activated protein kinases, thereby increasing the release of brain-derived neurotrophic factor (BDNF) from microglia. BDNF released from microglia induces neuronal hyperexcitability through interaction with the TrkB receptor. More importantly, recent work shows that P2X_{4} receptor activation is not only necessary for neuropathic pain, but it is also sufficient to cause neuropathic pain.

== See also ==
- P2X receptor
