= AF-353 =

Chemical compound

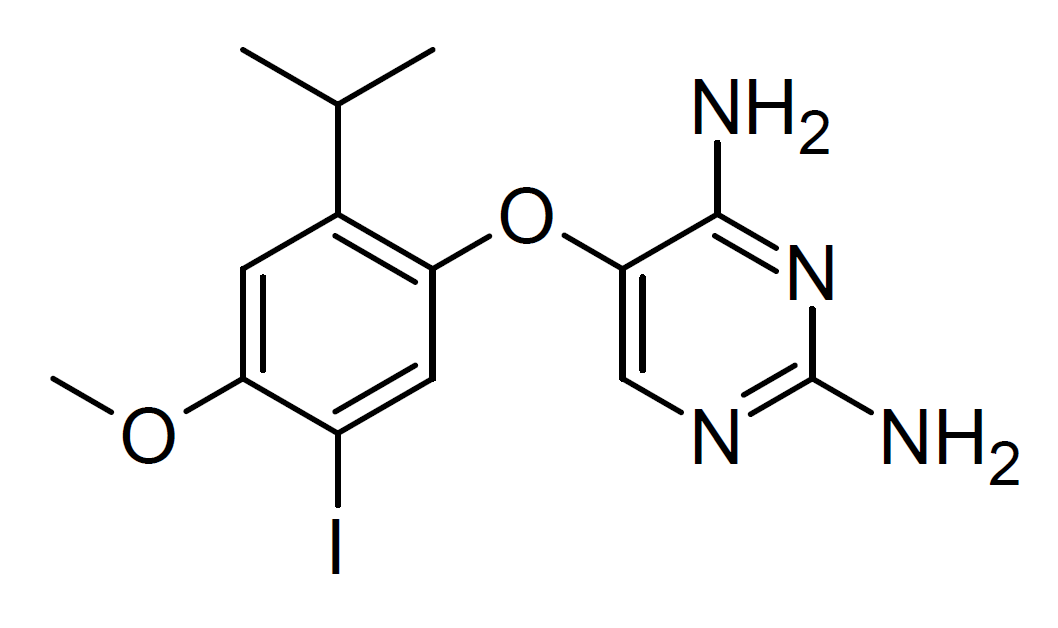

Identifiers
- IUPAC name: 5-(5-iodo-4-methoxy-2-propan-2-ylphenoxy)pyrimidine-2,4-diamine
- CAS Number: 865305-30-2
- PubChem CID: 15953802
- IUPHAR/BPS: 4125
- ChemSpider: 13095601
- ChEMBL: ChEMBL526307
- CompTox Dashboard (EPA): DTXSID90580447

Chemical and physical data
- Formula: C_{14}H_{17}IN_{4}O_{2}
- Molar mass: 400.220 g·mol^{−1}
- 3D model (JSmol): Interactive image
- SMILES: CC(C)C1=CC(=C(C=C1OC2=CN=C(N=C2N)N)I)OC
- InChI: InChI=1S/C14H17IN4O2/c1-7(2)8-4-11(20-3)9(15)5-10(8)21-12-6-18-14(17)19-13(12)16/h4-7H,1-3H3,(H4,16,17,18,19); Key:AATPYXMXFBBKFO-UHFFFAOYSA-N

AF-353 is a drug which acts as an antagonist of the P2X3 homotrimeric and P2X2/3 heterotrimeric forms of the P2X purinoreceptors. It has been found to block taste responses and has been proposed as an agent for masking the bitter taste of medications.

== See also ==
- PPADS
