= KN-62 =

Names
- Preferred IUPAC name 4-[(2S)-2-(N-Methylisoquinoline-5-sulfonamido)-3-oxo-3-(4-phenylpiperazin-1-yl)propyl]phenyl isoquinoline-5-sulfonate

Identifiers
CAS Number	127191-97-3
3D model (JSmol)	Interactive image
ChemSpider	4471558
IUPHAR/BPS	4235
MeSH	C063302
PubChem CID	5312126
UNII	63HM46XPOW
CompTox Dashboard (EPA)	DTXSID70925812
- InChI: InChI=1S/C38H35N5O6S2/c1-41(50(45,46)36-11-5-7-29-26-39-19-17-33(29)36)35(38(44)43-23-21-42(22-24-43)31-9-3-2-4-10-31)25-28-13-15-32(16-14-28)49-51(47,48)37-12-6-8-30-27-40-20-18-34(30)37/h2-20,26-27,35H,21-25H2,1H3/t35-/m0/s1 Key: RJVLFQBBRSMWHX-DHUJRADRSA-N; InChI=1/C38H35N5O6S2/c1-41(50(45,46)36-11-5-7-29-26-39-19-17-33(29)36)35(38(44)43-23-21-42(22-24-43)31-9-3-2-4-10-31)25-28-13-15-32(16-14-28)49-51(47,48)37-12-6-8-30-27-40-20-18-34(30)37/h2-20,26-27,35H,21-25H2,1H3/t35-/m0/s1 Key: RJVLFQBBRSMWHX-DHUJRADRBK
- SMILES: CN([C@@H](CC1=CC=C(C=C1)OS(=O)(=O)C2=CC=CC3=C2C=CN=C3)C(=O)N4CCN(CC4)C5=CC=CC=C5)S(=O)(=O)C6=CC=CC7=C6C=CN=C7

Properties
Chemical formula	C_{38}H_{35}N_{5}O_{6}S_{2}
Molar mass	721.84 g/mol
Boiling point	964.7±75.0 °C at 760 mmHg

Hazards
Flash point	537.3±37.1 °C
- Except where otherwise noted, data are given for materials in their standard state (at 25 °C [77 °F], 100 kPa). Infobox references

KN-62 is a derivative of isoquinolinesulfonamide, it is a selective, specific and cell permeable inhibitor of Ca2+/calmodulin-dependent kinase type II (CaMK II) with IC_{50} of 900nM, charactered by hydrophobicity. KN-62 also potently inhibits the purinergic receptor P2X7.

== Inhibitory mechanism on CaMK II ==
KN-62 blocks the combination of CaM and CaMK II by binding directly to the calmodulin binding site of the enzyme, disenables CaMK II's autophosphorylation, consequently leading inactivation. Kinetic analysis exhibits that this inhibitory effect of KN-62 is competitive with respect to calmodulin. Since KN-62 binds to the calmodulin binding site of CaMK II, KN-62 doesn't inhibit activity of autophosphorylated CaMK II.
Besides, KN-62 also acts as a potent non-competitive antagonist at the purinergic receptor P2RX7 with IC50 of 15nM.
