= P2RX3 =

Protein-coding gene in the species Homo sapiens

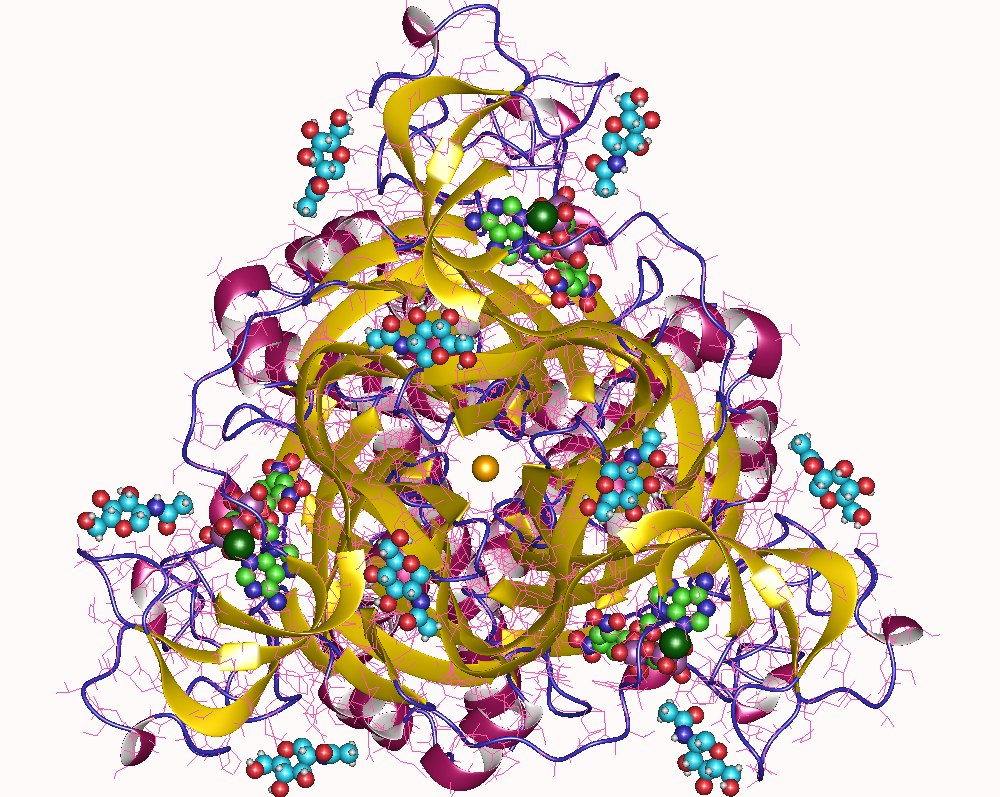

Identifiers
- Aliases: P2RX3, P2X3, purinergic receptor P2X 3
- External IDs: OMIM: 600843; MGI: 1097160; GeneCards: P2RX3

Gene location (Human)
Chr.	Chromosome 11 (human)
Band	11q12.1	Start	57,338,352 bp
Band	11q12.1	End	57,372,396 bp

Gene location (Mouse)
Chr.	Chromosome 2 (mouse)
Band	2|2 D	Start	84,998,583 bp
Band	2|2 D	End	85,037,462 bp
RNA expression pattern
Bgee	Human / Mouse (ortholog); Top expressed in: gonad; testicle; apex of heart; left testis; right testis; left ventricle; right lobe of liver; left adrenal cortex; right adrenal gland; striated muscle tissue / Top expressed in: lumbar spinal ganglion; spermatid; ganglion of vagus nerve; trigeminal ganglion; blastocyst; seminiferous tubule; greater petrosal nerve; spermatocyte; neural tube; tail of embryo; More reference expression data
BioGPS	n/a
Gene ontology
Molecular function	purinergic nucleotide receptor activity; ion channel activity; ATP binding; extracellularly ATP-gated cation channel activity; nucleotide binding; ATP-gated ion channel activity
Cellular component	integral component of membrane; rough endoplasmic reticulum; Golgi apparatus; membrane; receptor complex; dendritic spine; integral component of nuclear inner membrane; integral component of plasma membrane; soma; terminal bouton; axon; membrane raft; neuron projection; plasma membrane; Schaffer collateral - CA1 synapse; hippocampal mossy fiber to CA3 synapse; integral component of presynaptic membrane
Biological process	peristalsis; response to ATP; response to hypoxia; positive regulation of calcium-mediated signaling; positive regulation of calcium ion transport into cytosol; urinary bladder smooth muscle contraction; response to mechanical stimulus; cation transport; response to heat; ion transport; behavioral response to formalin induced pain; response to organic substance; cation transmembrane transport; regulation of synaptic plasticity; neuromuscular synaptic transmission; positive regulation of sensory perception of pain; behavioral response to pain; response to cold; protein homooligomerization; response to carbohydrate; sensory perception of taste; signal transduction; neuronal action potential; response to temperature stimulus; chemical synaptic transmission; purinergic nucleotide receptor signaling pathway; blood coagulation; excitatory postsynaptic potential; protein homotrimerization; cellular response to ATP; modulation of chemical synaptic transmission; ion transmembrane transport
Sources:Amigo / QuickGO
Orthologs
Databases	NCBI: entry; OMA: entry
Species	Human	Mouse
Entrez	5024	228139
Ensembl	ENSG00000109991	ENSMUSG00000027071
UniProt	P56373	Q3UR32
RefSeq (mRNA)	NM_002559	NM_145526
RefSeq (protein)	NP_002550	NP_663501
Location (UCSC)	Chr 11: 57.34 – 57.37 Mb	Chr 2: 85 – 85.04 Mb
PubMed search
- Wikidata
View/Edit Human	View/Edit Mouse

P2X purinoceptor 3 is a protein that in humans is encoded by the P2RX3 gene.

The product of this gene belongs to the family of purinoceptors for ATP. This receptor functions as a ligand-gated ion channel and may transduce ATP-evoked nociceptor activation. Mouse studies suggest that this receptor is important for peripheral pain responses, and also participates in pathways controlling urinary bladder volume reflexes, platelet aggregation, macrophage activation, apoptosis and neuronal–glial interactions. It is possible that the development of selective antagonists for this receptor may have a therapeutic potential in pain relief and in the treatment of disorders of urine storage.

== Ligands ==
=== Antagonists ===
Not true antagonists, but negative allosteric modulators:

- Camlipixant (BLU-5937)
- Gefapixant
- Opiranserin
- Quercetin
- PSFL2915

== See also ==
- P2X purinoreceptor
- Purinergic receptor
- Ligand-gated ion channel
- Nociceptor
