= P2RX1 =

Protein-coding gene in the species Homo sapiens

Identifiers
- Aliases: P2RX1, P2X1, purinergic receptor P2X 1
- External IDs: OMIM: 600845; MGI: 1098235; GeneCards: P2RX1

Gene location (Human)
Chr.	Chromosome 17 (human)
Band	17p13.2	Start	3,896,592 bp
Band	17p13.2	End	3,916,476 bp

Gene location (Mouse)
Chr.	Chromosome 11 (mouse)
Band	11 B4|11 45.09 cM	Start	72,889,929 bp
Band	11 B4|11 45.09 cM	End	72,906,026 bp
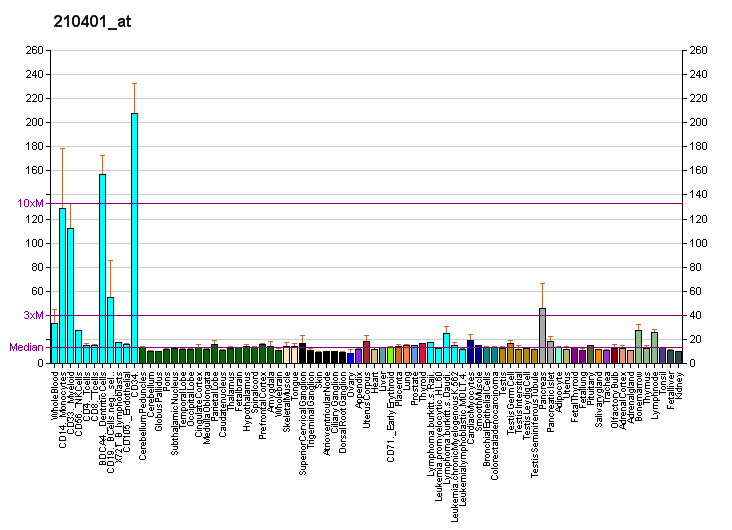
RNA expression pattern
Bgee	Human / Mouse (ortholog); Top expressed in: popliteal artery; tibial arteries; saphenous vein; body of pancreas; monocyte; granulocyte; blood; right coronary artery; bone marrow cell; left coronary artery / Top expressed in: detrusor urinae muscle; umbilical cord; blood; tunica media of zone of aorta; granulocyte; thymus; embryo; tibiofemoral joint; Ileal epithelium; perirhinal cortex; More reference expression data
BioGPS	More reference expression data
Gene ontology
Molecular function	zinc ion binding; purinergic nucleotide receptor activity; ion channel activity; cation channel activity; ATP binding; extracellularly ATP-gated cation channel activity; ATP-gated ion channel activity
Cellular component	integral component of membrane; postsynaptic membrane; membrane; plasma membrane; integral component of nuclear inner membrane; integral component of plasma membrane; membrane raft; neuron projection; secretory granule membrane; specific granule membrane; external side of plasma membrane; protein-containing complex; glutamatergic synapse; integral component of postsynaptic membrane; integral component of presynaptic active zone membrane
Biological process	response to ATP; regulation of calcium ion transport; synaptic transmission, glutamatergic; protein heterooligomerization; regulation of smooth muscle contraction; vasoconstriction; ceramide biosynthetic process; serotonin secretion by platelet; blood coagulation; ion transport; response to organic substance; cation transmembrane transport; platelet activation; regulation of blood pressure; regulation of vasoconstriction; positive regulation of ion transport; insemination; protein homooligomerization; activation of cysteine-type endopeptidase activity involved in apoptotic process; regulation of vascular associated smooth muscle contraction; neuronal action potential; signal transduction; apoptotic process; purinergic nucleotide receptor signaling pathway; neutrophil degranulation; excitatory postsynaptic potential; regulation of presynaptic cytosolic calcium ion concentration; regulation of synaptic vesicle exocytosis; cation transport; ion transmembrane transport
Sources:Amigo / QuickGO
Orthologs
Databases	NCBI: entry; OMA: entry
Species	Human	Mouse
Entrez	5023	18436
Ensembl	ENSG00000108405	ENSMUSG00000020787
UniProt	P51575	P51576
RefSeq (mRNA)	NM_002558	NM_008771
RefSeq (protein)	NP_002549	NP_032797
Location (UCSC)	Chr 17: 3.9 – 3.92 Mb	Chr 11: 72.89 – 72.91 Mb
PubMed search
- Wikidata
View/Edit Human	View/Edit Mouse

P2X purinoceptor 1, also ATP receptor, is a protein that in humans is encoded by the P2RX1 gene.

The product of this gene belongs to the family of purinoceptors for ATP. This receptor functions as a ligand-gated ion channel with relatively high calcium permeability. Expressed in smooth muscle and platelets. Binding to ATP mediates synaptic transmission between neurons and from neurons to smooth muscle, being responsible, for example, for sympathetic vasoconstriction in small arteries, arterioles and vas deferens. Mouse studies suggest that this receptor is essential for normal male reproductive function. It is possible that the development of selective antagonists for this receptor may provide an effective non-hormonal male contraceptive pill.

== See also ==
- P2X receptor
