= Camlipixant =

Chemical compound

Clinical data
- Other names: BLU-5937

Legal status
- Legal status: Investigational

Identifiers
- IUPAC name: methyl (2S)-2-[[2-[2,6-difluoro-4-(methylcarbamoyl)phenyl]-7-methylimidazo[1,2-a]pyridin-3-yl]methyl]morpholine-4-carboxylate
- CAS Number: 1621164-74-6
- PubChem CID: 76955630
- IUPHAR/BPS: 11232
- DrugBank: DB19217
- ChemSpider: 114989864
- UNII: TB7D2H7MZZ
- KEGG: D12785
- ChEMBL: ChEMBL5095035

Chemical and physical data
- Formula: C_{23}H_{24}F_{2}N_{4}O_{4}
- Molar mass: 458.466 g·mol^{−1}
- 3D model (JSmol): Interactive image
- SMILES: CC1=CC2=NC(=C(N2C=C1)C[C@H]3CN(CCO3)C(=O)OC)C4=C(C=C(C=C4F)C(=O)NC)F
- InChI: InChI=1S/C23H24F2N4O4/c1-13-4-5-29-18(11-15-12-28(6-7-33-15)23(31)32-3)21(27-19(29)8-13)20-16(24)9-14(10-17(20)25)22(30)26-2/h4-5,8-10,15H,6-7,11-12H2,1-3H3,(H,26,30)/t15-/m0/s1; Key:SEHLMRJSQFAPCJ-HNNXBMFYSA-N

Camlipixant is an investigational new drug that has been evaluated for the treatment of chronic cough and irritable bowel syndrome. It is a P2X3 receptor antagonist.

On July 17th 2026, GSK announced that the drug had failed to meet its primary endpoint in one of two phase 3 trials, and would be discontinuing development for chronic cough. The drug will continue to be investigated for use in irritable bowel syndrome.

== See also ==
- gefapixant
