= LSM4 =

Protein-coding gene in the species Homo sapiens

Identifiers
- Aliases: LSM4, GRP, YER112W, LSM4 homolog, U6 small nuclear RNA and mRNA degradation associated
- External IDs: OMIM: 607284; MGI: 1354692; GeneCards: LSM4
Available structures
PDB	Ortholog search: PDBe RCSB
PDB	List of PDB id codes 3JCR

Gene location (Human)
Chr.	Chromosome 19 (human)
Band	19p13.11	Start	18,306,236 bp
Band	19p13.11	End	18,323,112 bp

Gene location (Mouse)
Chr.	Chromosome 8 (mouse)
Band	8|8 B3.3	Start	71,125,898 bp
Band	8|8 B3.3	End	71,131,402 bp
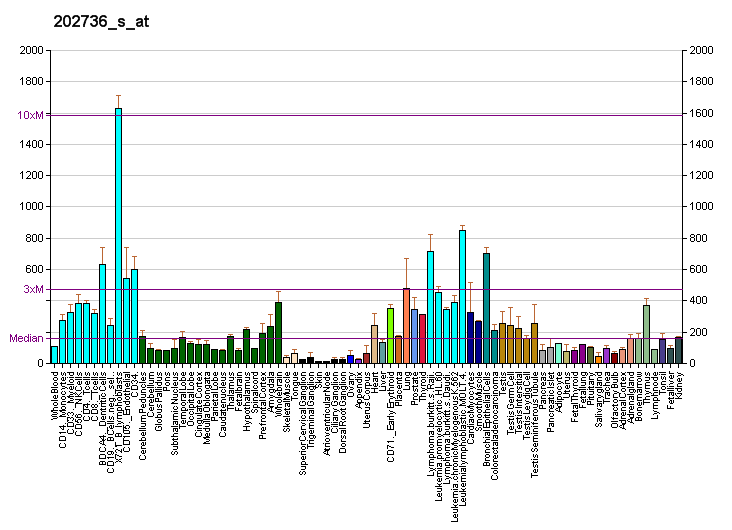

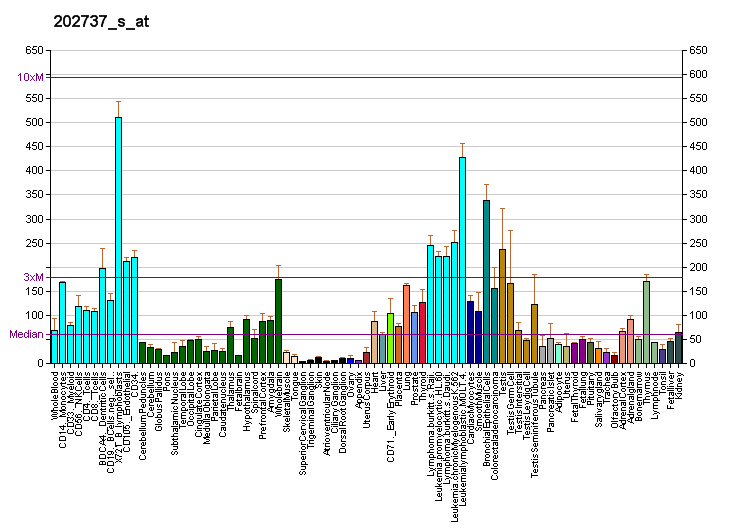
RNA expression pattern
Bgee	Human / Mouse (ortholog); Top expressed in: mucosa of transverse colon; right testis; left testis; ventricular zone; right adrenal gland; right adrenal cortex; left adrenal cortex; embryo; ganglionic eminence; apex of heart / Top expressed in: yolk sac; thymus; bone marrow; lens; epiblast; ventricular zone; proximal tubule; embryo; ileum; ganglionic eminence; More reference expression data
BioGPS	More reference expression data
Gene ontology
Molecular function	protein binding; U6 snRNA binding; RNA binding; PH domain binding
Cellular component	spliceosomal tri-snRNP complex; U6 snRNP; P-body; nucleoplasm; neuron projection; spliceosomal complex; nucleus; cytosol; membrane; protein-containing complex; U4/U6 x U5 tri-snRNP complex; U2-type precatalytic spliceosome; Lsm2-8 complex
Biological process	RNA processing; mRNA processing; spliceosomal snRNP assembly; spliceosomal complex assembly; P-body assembly; exonucleolytic catabolism of deadenylated mRNA; RNA splicing; mRNA splicing, via spliceosome; nuclear-transcribed mRNA catabolic process
Sources:Amigo / QuickGO
Orthologs
Databases	NCBI: entry; OMA: entry
Species	Human	Mouse
Entrez	25804	50783
Ensembl	ENSG00000130520	ENSMUSG00000031848
UniProt	Q9Y4Z0	Q9QXA5
RefSeq (mRNA)	NM_012321; NM_001252129	NM_015816; NM_001359042
RefSeq (protein)	NP_001239058; NP_036453	NP_056631; NP_001345971
Location (UCSC)	Chr 19: 18.31 – 18.32 Mb	Chr 8: 71.13 – 71.13 Mb
PubMed search
- Wikidata
View/Edit Human	View/Edit Mouse

U6 snRNA-associated Sm-like protein LSm4 is a protein that in humans is encoded by the LSM4 gene.

Sm-like proteins were identified in a variety of organisms based on sequence homology with the Sm protein family (see SNRPD2; MIM 601061). Sm-like proteins contain the Sm sequence motif, which consists of 2 regions separated by a linker of variable length that folds as a loop. The Sm-like proteins are thought to form a stable heteromer present in tri-snRNP particles, which are important for pre-mRNA splicing.[supplied by OMIM]
