= CHRNG =

Protein-coding gene in humans

Identifiers
- Aliases: CHRNG, ACHRG, cholinergic receptor nicotinic gamma subunit
- External IDs: OMIM: 100730; MGI: 87895; GeneCards: CHRNG

Gene location (Human)
Chr.	Chromosome 2 (human)
Band	2q37.1	Start	232,539,692 bp
Band	2q37.1	End	232,548,115 bp

Gene location (Mouse)
Chr.	Chromosome 1 (mouse)
Band	1 C5|1 44.07 cM	Start	87,132,379 bp
Band	1 C5|1 44.07 cM	End	87,140,416 bp
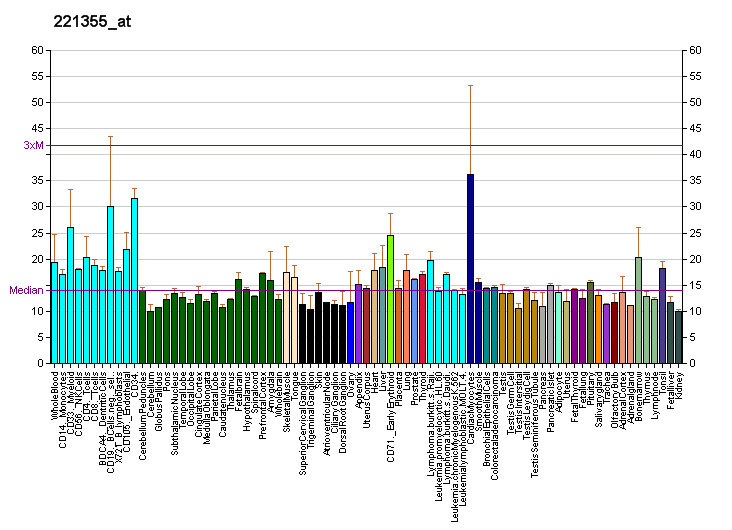
RNA expression pattern
Bgee	Human / Mouse (ortholog); Top expressed in: gastrocnemius muscle; muscle of thigh; cerebellar vermis; glutes; synovial joint; human penis; periodontal fiber; skeletal muscle tissue; sural nerve; seminal vesicula / Top expressed in: lens; internal carotid artery; mylohyoid muscle; tongue muscle; erector spinae muscles; tongue; Psoas; zygote; shoulder; psoas major muscle; More reference expression data
BioGPS	More reference expression data
Gene ontology
Molecular function	channel activity; acetylcholine binding; acetylcholine receptor activity; ion channel activity; protein binding; extracellular ligand-gated ion channel activity; ligand-gated ion channel activity; acetylcholine-gated cation-selective channel activity; transmembrane signaling receptor activity
Cellular component	integral component of membrane; acetylcholine-gated channel complex; postsynaptic membrane; membrane; plasma membrane; synapse; integral component of plasma membrane; cell junction; neuron projection
Biological process	muscle contraction; response to nicotine; synaptic transmission, cholinergic; ion transport; cation transmembrane transport; neuromuscular synaptic transmission; signal transduction; regulation of postsynaptic membrane potential; excitatory postsynaptic potential; ion transmembrane transport; chemical synaptic transmission; regulation of membrane potential; nervous system process
Sources:Amigo / QuickGO
Orthologs
Databases	NCBI: entry; OMA: entry
Species	Human	Mouse
Entrez	1146	11449
Ensembl	ENSG00000196811	ENSMUSG00000026253
UniProt	P07510	P04760
RefSeq (mRNA)	NM_005199	NM_009604
RefSeq (protein)	NP_005190	n/a
Location (UCSC)	Chr 2: 232.54 – 232.55 Mb	Chr 1: 87.13 – 87.14 Mb
PubMed search
- Wikidata
View/Edit Human	View/Edit Mouse

Acetylcholine receptor subunit gamma is a protein that in humans is encoded by the CHRNG gene.

It is one of the subunits that compose the nicotinic acetylcholine receptor (nAChR). The nAChR is a pentameric ionotropic receptor composed of five of four different subunits : two alpha (α), one beta (β), one delta (δ) and either one gamma (γ) or one epsilon (ε).

Two forms of AChR are found in mammalian skeletal muscle cells. The mature form, containing the epsilon subunit, which is specific to this mature AChR subtype, is predominant in innervated adult muscle and the embryonic form, containing gamma is present in fetal and denervated muscle.

This switch is mediated by Neuregulin 1 (acetylcholine receptor-inducing activity).

== Clinical significance ==
Mutations in CHRNG are known to cause the following conditions:

- Multiple pterygium syndrome, lethal type (LMPS);
- Multiple pterygium syndrome, Escobar variant (EVMPS).
