= JNJ-55308942 =

Chemical compound

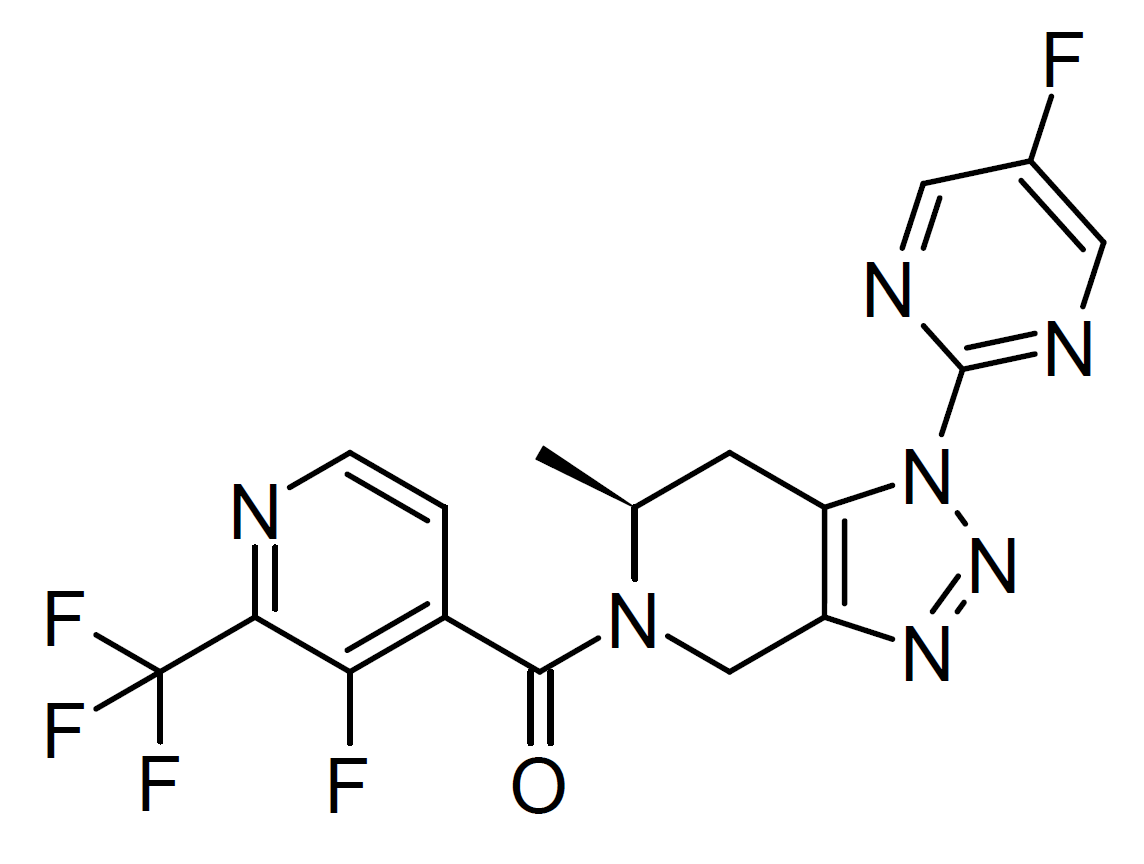

Clinical data
- Trade names: Zanvipixant

Legal status
- Legal status: Investigational New Drug

Identifiers
- IUPAC name: (S)-(3-fluoro-2-(trifluoromethyl)pyridin-4-yl)(1-(5-fluoropyrimidin-2-yl)-6-methyl-6,7-dihydro-1H-[1,2,3]triazolo[4,5-c]pyridin-5(4H)-yl)methanone
- CAS Number: 2166558-11-6
- PubChem CID: 90408860
- DrugBank: DB19110
- ChemSpider: 76771276
- UNII: B7YN3CQ7S7
- ChEMBL: ChEMBL3914857

Chemical and physical data
- Formula: C_{17}H_{12}F_{5}N_{7}O
- Molar mass: 425.323 g·mol^{−1}
- 3D model (JSmol): Interactive image
- SMILES: C[C@H]1CC2=C(CN1C(=O)C3=C(C(=NC=C3)C(F)(F)F)F)N=NN2C4=NC=C(C=N4)F
- InChI: InChI=1S/C17H12F5N7O/c1-8-4-12-11(26-27-29(12)16-24-5-9(18)6-25-16)7-28(8)15(30)10-2-3-23-14(13(10)19)17(20,21)22/h2-3,5-6,8H,4,7H2,1H3/t8-/m0/s1; Key:LMDWZBQISRTEBH-QMMMGPOBSA-N

JNJ-55308942 is an investigational drug that works as a P2X7 antagonist with a downstream effect of reducing interleukin-1β release. It is developed by Janssen Pharmaceuticals for bipolar depression.

== See also ==
- List of investigational bipolar disorder drugs
- JNJ-54175446
