= Ligand-gated ion channel =

Type of ion channel transmembrane protein

Neurotransmitter-gated ion-channel transmembrane region
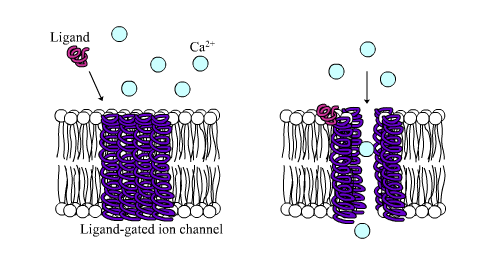
- Ligand-gated ion channel

Identifiers
- Symbol: Neur_chan_memb
- Pfam: PF02932
- InterPro: IPR006029
- PROSITE: PDOC00209
- SCOP2: 1cek / SCOPe / SUPFAM
- TCDB: 1.A.9
- OPM superfamily: 14
- OPM protein: 2bg9
Available protein structures:
- PDB: IPR006029 PF02932 (ECOD; PDBsum)
- AlphaFold: IPR006029; PF02932

1. Ion-channel-linked receptor; 2. Ions; 3. Ligand (such as acetylcholine); When ligands bind to the receptor, the ion channel portion of the receptor opens, allowing ions to pass across the cell membrane.

Ligand-gated ion channel showing the binding of transmitter (Tr) and changing of membrane potential (Vm)

Ligand-gated ion channels (LICs, LGIC), also commonly referred to as ionotropic receptors, are a group of transmembrane ion-channel proteins which open to allow ions such as Na^{+}, K^{+}, Ca^{2+}, and/or Cl^{−} to pass through the membrane in response to the binding of a chemical messenger (i.e. a ligand), such as a neurotransmitter.

When a presynaptic neuron is excited, it releases a neurotransmitter from vesicles into the synaptic cleft. The neurotransmitter then binds to receptors located on the postsynaptic neuron. If these receptors are ligand-gated ion channels, a resulting conformational change opens the ion channels, which leads to a flow of ions across the cell membrane. This, in turn, results in either a depolarization, for an excitatory receptor response, or a hyperpolarization, for an inhibitory response.

These receptor proteins are typically composed of at least two different domains: a transmembrane domain which includes the ion pore, and an extracellular domain which includes the ligand binding location (an allosteric binding site). This modularity has enabled a 'divide and conquer' approach to finding the structure of the proteins (crystallising each domain separately). The function of such receptors located at synapses is to convert the chemical signal of presynaptically released neurotransmitter directly and very quickly into a postsynaptic electrical signal. Many LICs are additionally modulated by allosteric ligands, by channel blockers, ions, or the membrane potential. LICs are classified into three superfamilies which lack evolutionary relationship: cys-loop receptors, ionotropic glutamate receptors and ATP-gated channels.

== Cys-loop receptors ==
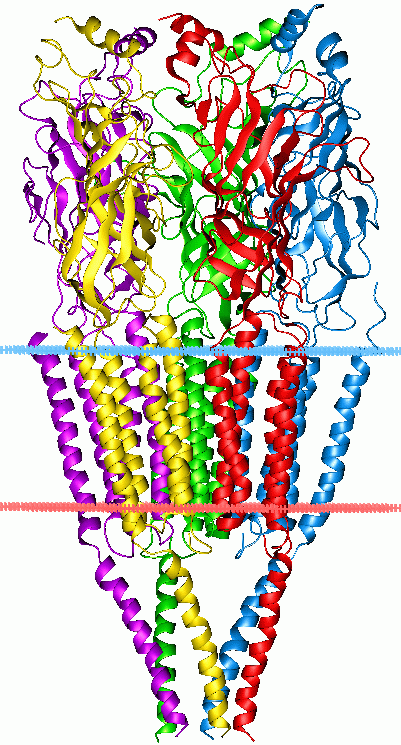
Nicotinic acetylcholine receptor in closed state with predicted membrane boundaries shown, PDB 2BG9

The cys-loop receptors are named after a characteristic loop formed by a disulfide bond between two cysteine residues in the N terminal extracellular domain. They are part of a larger family of pentameric ligand-gated ion channels that usually lack this disulfide bond, hence the tentative name "Pro-loop receptors". A binding site in the extracellular N-terminal ligand-binding domain gives them receptor specificity for (1) acetylcholine (AcCh), (2) serotonin, (3) glycine, (4) glutamate and (5) γ-aminobutyric acid (GABA) in vertebrates. The receptors are subdivided with respect to the type of ion that they conduct (anionic or cationic) and further into families defined by the endogenous ligand. They are usually pentameric with each subunit containing 4 transmembrane helices constituting the transmembrane domain, and a beta sheet sandwich type, extracellular, N terminal, ligand binding domain. Some also contain an intracellular domain like shown in the image.

The prototypic ligand-gated ion channel is the nicotinic acetylcholine receptor. It consists of a pentamer of protein subunits (typically ααβγδ), with two binding sites for acetylcholine (one at the interface of each alpha subunit). When the acetylcholine binds it alters the receptor's configuration (twists the T2 helices which moves the leucine residues, which block the pore, out of the channel pathway) and causes the constriction in the pore of approximately 3 angstroms to widen to approximately 8 angstroms so that ions can pass through. This pore allows Na^{+} ions to flow down their electrochemical gradient into the cell. With a sufficient number of channels opening at once, the inward flow of positive charges carried by Na^{+} ions depolarizes the postsynaptic membrane sufficiently to initiate an action potential.

A bacterial homologue to an LIC has been identified, hypothesized to act nonetheless as a chemoreceptor. This prokaryotic nAChR variant is known as the GLIC receptor, after the species in which it was identified; Gloeobacter Ligand-gated Ion Channel.

=== Structure ===
Cys-loop receptors have structural elements that are well conserved, with a large extracellular domain (ECD) harboring an alpha-helix and 10 beta-strands. Following the ECD, four transmembrane segments (TMSs) are connected by intracellular and extracellular loop structures. Except the TMS 3-4 loop, their lengths are only 7-14 residues. The TMS 3-4 loop forms the largest part of the intracellular domain (ICD) and exhibits the most variable region between all of these homologous receptors. The ICD is defined by the TMS 3-4 loop together with the TMS 1-2 loop preceding the ion channel pore. Crystallization has revealed structures for some members of the family, but to allow crystallization, the intracellular loop was usually replaced by a short linker present in prokaryotic cys-loop receptors, so their structures as not known. Nevertheless, this intracellular loop appears to function in desensitization, modulation of channel physiology by pharmacological substances, and posttranslational modifications. Motifs important for trafficking are therein, and the ICD interacts with scaffold proteins enabling inhibitory synapse formation.

=== Cationic cys-loop receptors ===
Type	Class	IUPHAR-recommended protein name	Gene	Previous names
Serotonin (5-HT)	5-HT_{3}	5-HT3A; 5-HT3B; 5-HT3C; 5-HT3D; 5-HT3E	HTR3A; HTR3B; HTR3C; HTR3D; HTR3E	5-HT_{3A} 5-HT_{3B} 5-HT_{3C} 5-HT_{3D} 5-HT_{3E}
Nicotinic acetylcholine (nAChR)	alpha	α1 α2 α3 α4 α5 α6 α7 α9 α10	CHRNA1; CHRNA2; CHRNA3; CHRNA4; CHRNA5; CHRNA6; CHRNA7; CHRNA9; CHRNA10	ACHRA, ACHRD, CHRNA, CMS2A, FCCMS, SCCMS
Nicotinic acetylcholine (nAChR)	beta	β1 β2 β3 β4	CHRNB1; CHRNB2; CHRNB3; CHRNB4	CMS2A, SCCMS, ACHRB, CHRNB, CMS1D; EFNL3, nAChRB2
Nicotinic acetylcholine (nAChR)	gamma	γ	CHRNG	ACHRG
Nicotinic acetylcholine (nAChR)	delta	δ	CHRND	ACHRD, CMS2A, FCCMS, SCCMS
Nicotinic acetylcholine (nAChR)	epsilon	ε	CHRNE	ACHRE, CMS1D, CMS1E, CMS2A, FCCMS, SCCMS
Zinc-activated ion channel (ZAC)		ZAC	ZACN	ZAC1, L2m LICZ, LICZ1

=== Anionic cys-loop receptors ===
Type	Class	IUPHAR-recommended protein name	Gene	Previous names
GABA_{A}	alpha	α1 α2 α3 α4 α5 α6	GABRA1; GABRA2; GABRA3; GABRA4; GABRA5; GABRA6	EJM, ECA4
GABA_{A}	beta	β1 β2 β3	GABRB1; GABRB2; GABRB3	ECA5
GABA_{A}	gamma	γ1 γ2 γ3	GABRG1; GABRG2; GABRG3	CAE2, ECA2, GEFSP3
GABA_{A}	delta	δ	GABRD	
GABA_{A}	epsilon	ε	GABRE	
GABA_{A}	pi	π	GABRP	
GABA_{A}	theta	θ	GABRQ	
GABA_{A}	rho	ρ1 ρ2 ρ3	GABRR1; GABRR2; GABRR3	GABA_{C}
Glycine (GlyR)	alpha	α1 α2 α3 α4	GLRA1; GLRA2; GLRA3; GLRA4	STHE
Glycine (GlyR)	beta	β	GLRB	

== Ionotropic glutamate receptors ==
The ionotropic glutamate receptors bind the neurotransmitter glutamate. They form tetramers, with each subunit consisting of an extracellular amino terminal domain (ATD, which is involved tetramer assembly), an extracellular ligand binding domain (LBD, which binds glutamate), and a transmembrane domain (TMD, which forms the ion channel). The transmembrane domain of each subunit contains three transmembrane helices as well as a half membrane helix with a reentrant loop. The structure of the protein starts with the ATD at the N terminus followed by the first half of the LBD which is interrupted by helices 1,2 and 3 of the TMD before continuing with the final half of the LBD and then finishing with helix 4 of the TMD at the C terminus. This means there are three links between the TMD and the extracellular domains. Each subunit of the tetramer has a binding site for glutamate formed by the two LBD sections forming a clamshell like shape. Only two of these sites in the tetramer need to be occupied to open the ion channel. The pore is mainly formed by the half helix 2 in a way which resembles an inverted potassium channel.

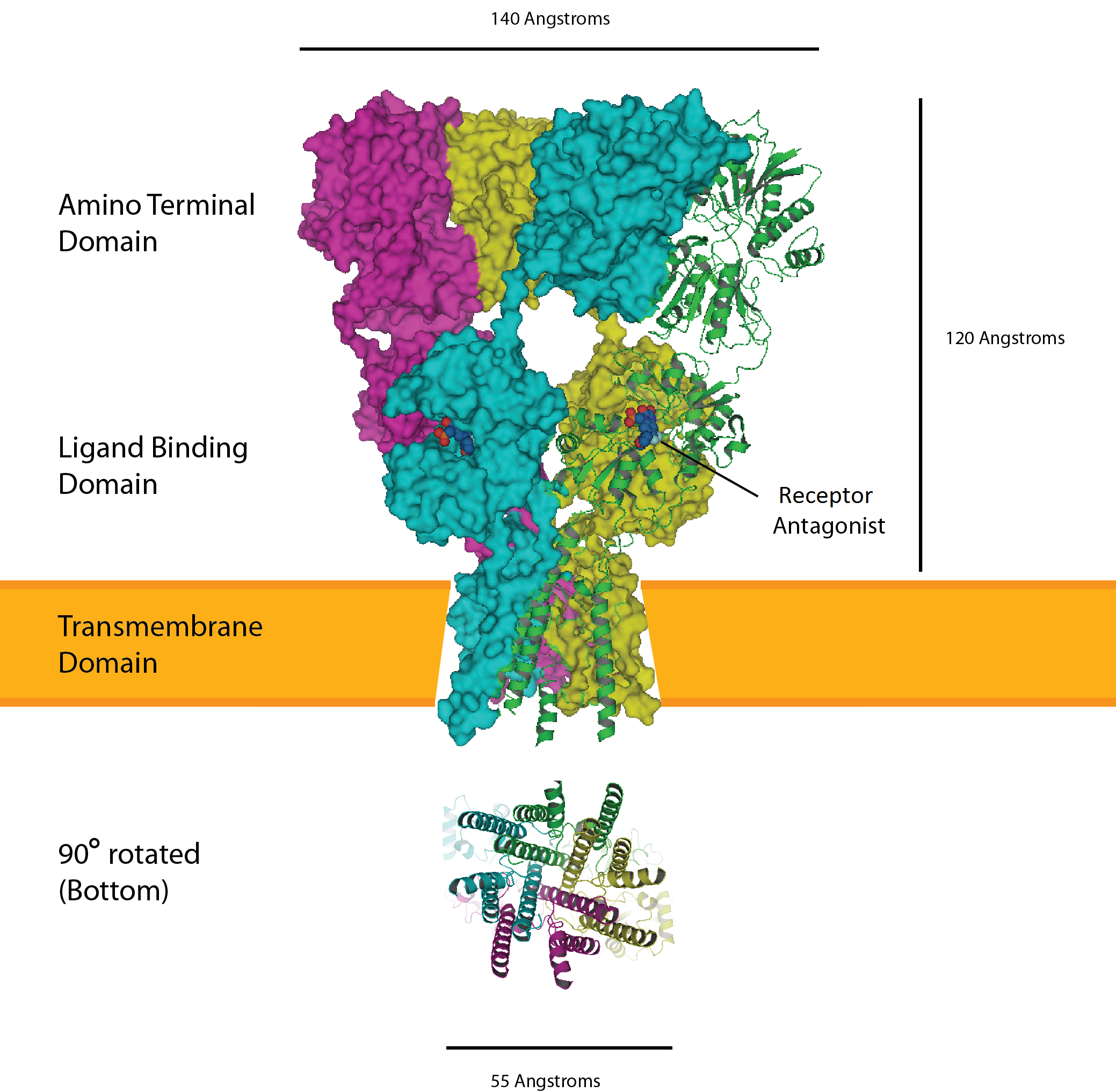
The AMPA receptor bound to a glutamate antagonist showing the amino terminal, ligand binding, and transmembrane domain, PDB 3KG2

Type	Class	IUPHAR-recommended protein name	Gene	Previous names
AMPA	GluA	GluA1; GluA2; GluA3; GluA4	GRIA1; GRIA2; GRIA3; GRIA4	GLU_{A1}, GluR1, GluRA, GluR-A, GluR-K1, HBGR1; GLU_{A2}, GluR2, GluRB, GluR-B, GluR-K2, HBGR2; GLU_{A3}, GluR3, GluRC, GluR-C, GluR-K3; GLU_{A4}, GluR4, GluRD, GluR-D
Kainate	GluK	GluK1; GluK2; GluK3; GluK4; GluK5	GRIK1; GRIK2; GRIK3; GRIK4; GRIK5	GLU_{K5}, GluR5, GluR-5, EAA3; GLU_{K6}, GluR6, GluR-6, EAA4; GLU_{K7}, GluR7, GluR-7, EAA5; GLU_{K1}, KA1, KA-1, EAA1; GLU_{K2}, KA2, KA-2, EAA2
NMDA	GluN	GluN1; NRL1A; NRL1B	GRIN1; GRINL1A; GRINL1B	GLU_{N1}, NMDA-R1, NR1, GluRξ1
NMDA	GluN	GluN2A; GluN2B; GluN2C; GluN2D	GRIN2A; GRIN2B; GRIN2C; GRIN2D	GLU_{N2A}, NMDA-R2A, NR2A, GluRε1; GLU_{N2B}, NMDA-R2B, NR2B, hNR3, GluRε2; GLU_{N2C}, NMDA-R2C, NR2C, GluRε3; GLU_{N2D}, NMDA-R2D, NR2D, GluRε4
NMDA	GluN	GluN3A; GluN3B	GRIN3A; GRIN3B	GLU_{N3A}, NMDA-R3A, NMDAR-L, chi-1 GLU_{3B}, NMDA-R3B
'Orphan'	(GluD)	GluD1; GluD2	GRID1; GRID2	GluRδ1; GluRδ2

=== AMPA receptor ===
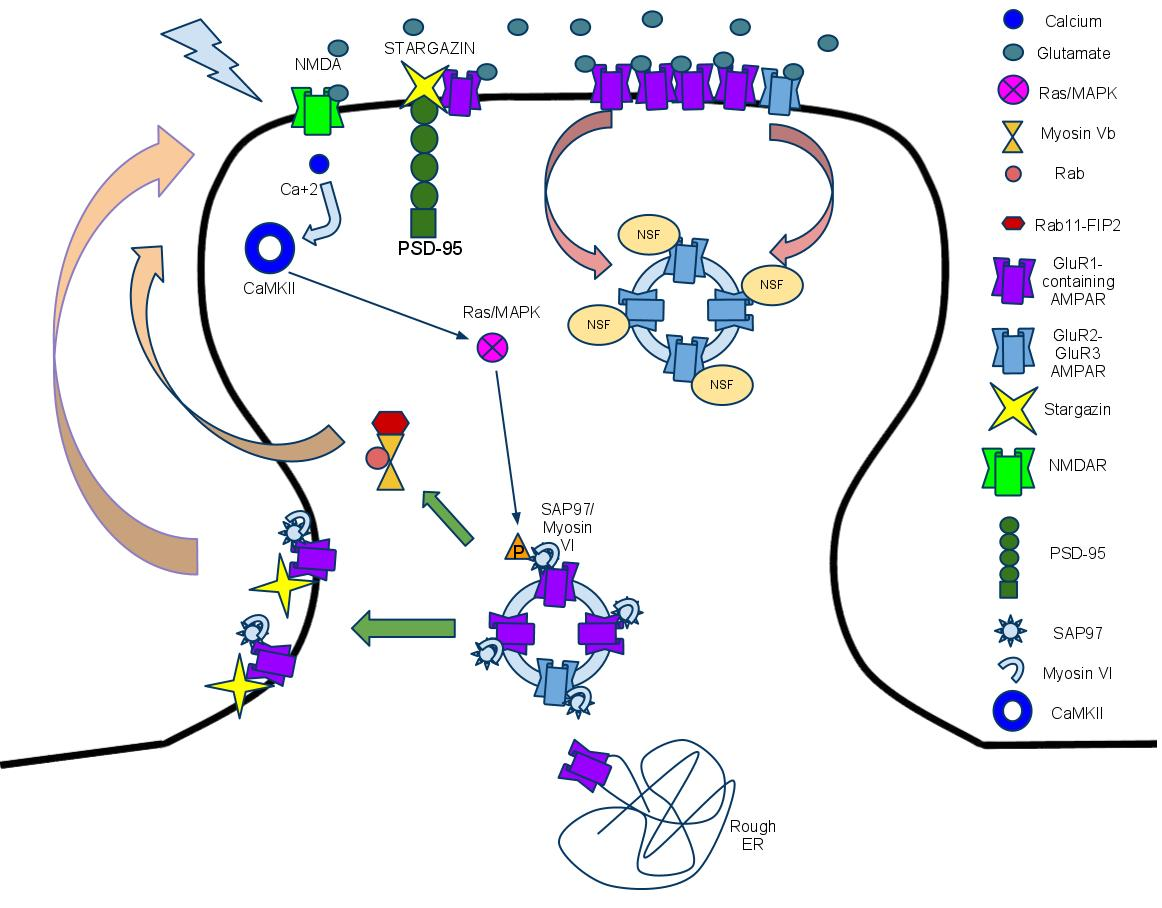
AMPA receptor trafficking

The α-amino-3-hydroxy-5-methyl-4-isoxazolepropionic acid receptor (also known as AMPA receptor, or quisqualate receptor) is a non-NMDA-type ionotropic transmembrane receptor for glutamate that mediates fast synaptic transmission in the central nervous system (CNS). Its name is derived from its ability to be activated by the artificial glutamate analog AMPA. The receptor was first named the "quisqualate receptor" by Watkins and colleagues after a naturally occurring agonist quisqualate and was only later given the label "AMPA receptor" after the selective agonist developed by Tage Honore and colleagues at the Royal Danish School of Pharmacy in Copenhagen. AMPARs are found in many parts of the brain and are the most commonly found receptor in the nervous system. The AMPA receptor GluA2 (GluR2) tetramer was the first glutamate receptor ion channel to be crystallized. Ligands include:

- Agonists: Glutamate, AMPA, 5-Fluorowillardiine, Domoic acid, Quisqualic acid, etc.
- Antagonists: CNQX, Kynurenic acid, NBQX, Perampanel, Piracetam, etc.
- Positive allosteric modulators: Aniracetam, Cyclothiazide, CX-516, CX-614, etc.
- Negative allosteric modulators: Ethanol, Perampanel, Talampanel, GYKI-52,466, etc.

=== NMDA receptors ===
Stylized depiction of an activated NMDAR

The N-methyl-D-aspartate receptor (NMDA receptor) – a type of ionotropic glutamate receptor – is a ligand-gated ion channel that is gated by the simultaneous binding of glutamate and a co-agonist (i.e., either D-serine or glycine). Studies show that the NMDA receptor is involved in regulating synaptic plasticity and memory.

The name "NMDA receptor" is derived from the ligand N-methyl-D-aspartate (NMDA), which acts as a selective agonist at these receptors. When the NMDA receptor is activated by the binding of two co-agonists, the cation channel opens, allowing Na^{+} and Ca^{2+} to flow into the cell, in turn raising the cell's electric potential. Thus, the NMDA receptor is an excitatory receptor. At resting potentials, the binding of Mg^{2+} or Zn^{2+} at their extracellular binding sites on the receptor blocks ion flux through the NMDA receptor channel. "However, when neurons are depolarized, for example, by intense activation of colocalized postsynaptic AMPA receptors, the voltage-dependent block by Mg^{2+} is partially relieved, allowing ion influx through activated NMDA receptors. The resulting Ca^{2+} influx can trigger a variety of intracellular signaling cascades, which can ultimately change neuronal function through activation of various kinases and phosphatases". Ligands include:

- Primary endogenous co-agonists: glutamate and either D-serine or glycine
- Other agonists : aminocyclopropanecarboxylic acid; D-cycloserine; L-aspartate; quinolinate, etc.
- Partial agonists : N-methyl-D-aspartic acid (NMDA); NRX-1074; 3,5-dibromo-L-phenylalanine, etc.
- Antagonists: ketamine, PCP, dextropropoxyphene, ketobemidone, tramadol, kynurenic acid (endogenous), etc.

== ATP-gated channels ==
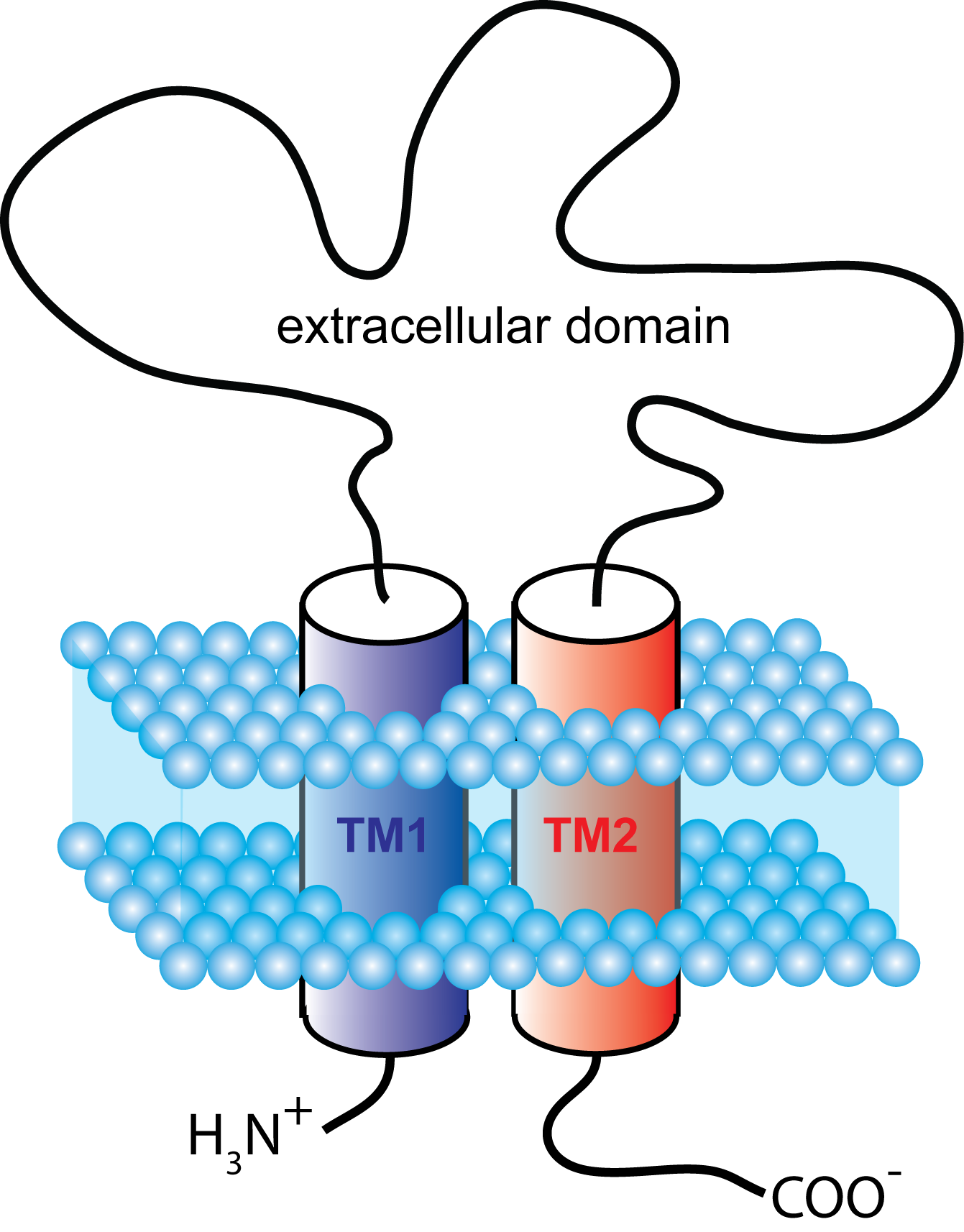
Figure 1. Schematic representation showing the membrane topology of a typical P2X receptor subunit. First and second transmembrane domains are labeled TM1 and TM2.

ATP-gated channels open in response to binding the nucleotide ATP. They form trimers with two transmembrane helices per subunit and both the C and N termini on the intracellular side.

Type	Class	IUPHAR-recommended protein name	Gene	Previous names
P2X	N/A	P2X1; P2X2; P2X3; P2X4; P2X5; P2X6; P2X7	P2RX1; P2RX2; P2RX3; P2RX4; P2RX5; P2RX6; P2RX7	P2X_{1} P2X_{2} P2X_{3} P2X_{4} P2X_{5} P2X_{6} P2X_{7}

== Clinical relevance ==
Ligand-gated ion channels are likely to be the major site at which anaesthetic agents and ethanol have their effects, although unequivocal evidence of this is yet to be established. In particular, the GABA and NMDA receptors are affected by anaesthetic agents at concentrations similar to those used in clinical anaesthesia.

By understanding the mechanism and exploring the chemical/biological/physical component that could function on those receptors, more and more clinical applications are proven by preliminary experiments or FDA. Memantine is approved by the U.S. F.D.A and the European Medicines Agency for the treatment of moderate-to-severe Alzheimer's disease, and has now received a limited recommendation by the UK's National Institute for Health and Care Excellence for patients who fail other treatment options. Agomelatine, is a type of drug that acts on a dual melatonergic-serotonergic pathway, which have shown its efficacy in the treatment of anxious depression during clinical trials, study also suggests the efficacy in the treatment of atypical and melancholic depression.

== See also ==
- Action potential
- Acid-sensing ion channel
- Calcium-activated potassium channel
- Cyclic nucleotide-gated ion channel
- Voltage-dependent calcium channel
- Receptor (biochemistry)
- Inositol trisphosphate receptor
- Metabotropic receptor
- Ryanodine receptor
