= P2RX2 =

Protein-coding gene in the species Homo sapiens

Identifiers
- Aliases: P2RX2, DFNA41, P2X2, purinergic receptor P2X 2
- External IDs: OMIM: 600844; MGI: 2665170; GeneCards: P2RX2

Gene location (Human)
Chr.	Chromosome 12 (human)
Band	12q24.33	Start	132,618,776 bp
Band	12q24.33	End	132,622,388 bp

Gene location (Mouse)
Chr.	Chromosome 5 (mouse)
Band	5|5 F	Start	110,487,678 bp
Band	5|5 F	End	110,491,078 bp
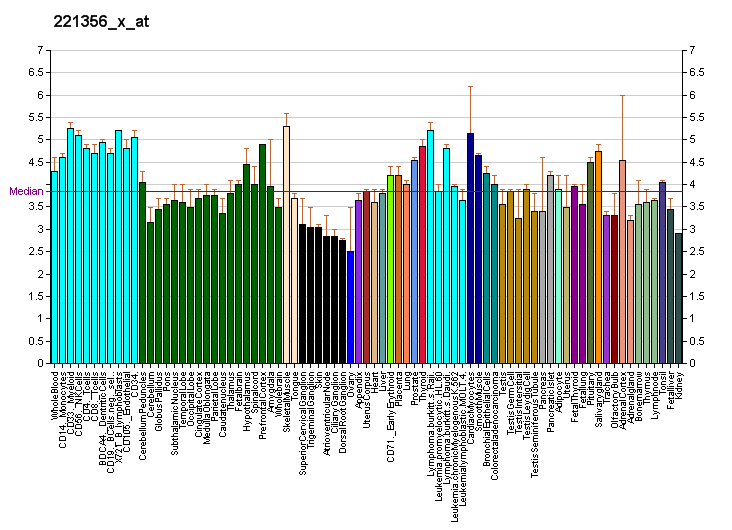

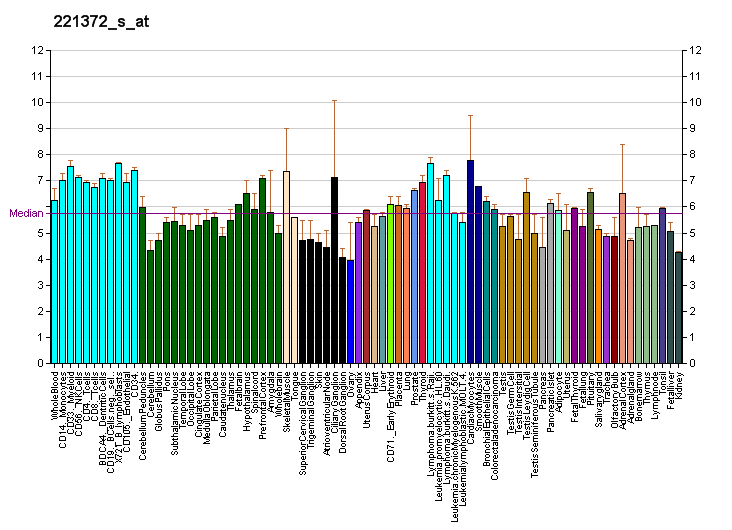
RNA expression pattern
Bgee	Human / Mouse (ortholog); Top expressed in: gastric mucosa; right lung; right uterine tube; prostate; caput epididymis; tail of epididymis; corpus epididymis; hippocampus proper; spleen; upper lobe of left lung / Top expressed in: vestibular membrane of cochlear duct; otolith organ; utricle; seminiferous tubule; spermatocyte; ganglion of vagus nerve; spermatid; vestibular sensory epithelium; cochlea; embryo; More reference expression data
BioGPS	More reference expression data
Gene ontology
Molecular function	purinergic nucleotide receptor activity; extracellularly ATP-gated cation channel activity; ion channel activity; ligand-gated ion channel activity; identical protein binding; ATP binding; ATP-gated ion channel activity
Cellular component	integral component of membrane; membrane; receptor complex; integral component of nuclear inner membrane; integral component of plasma membrane; intracellular anatomical structure; apical plasma membrane; plasma membrane; postsynapse; soma
Biological process	peristalsis; response to ATP; positive regulation of calcium-mediated signaling; response to hypoxia; positive regulation of calcium ion transport into cytosol; urinary bladder smooth muscle contraction; hearing; ion transport; response to organic substance; cation transmembrane transport; neuromuscular synaptic transmission; behavioral response to pain; neuromuscular junction development; skeletal muscle fiber development; detection of hypoxic conditions in blood by carotid body chemoreceptor signaling; protein homooligomerization; response to carbohydrate; sensory perception of taste; chemical synaptic transmission; blood coagulation; purinergic nucleotide receptor signaling pathway; excitatory postsynaptic potential; response to ischemia; cation transport; ion transmembrane transport
Sources:Amigo / QuickGO
Orthologs
Databases	NCBI: entry; OMA: entry
Species	Human	Mouse
Entrez	22953	231602
Ensembl	ENSG00000187848	ENSMUSG00000029503
UniProt	Q9UBL9	Q8K3P1
RefSeq (mRNA)	NM_001282164; NM_001282165; NM_012226; NM_016318; NM_170682 NM_170683; NM_174872; NM_174873	NM_001164833; NM_001164834; NM_153400; NM_001310700; NM_001310701
RefSeq (protein)	NP_001269093; NP_001269094; NP_036358; NP_057402; NP_733782 NP_733783; NP_777361; NP_777362	NP_001158305; NP_001158306; NP_001297629; NP_001297630; NP_700449
Location (UCSC)	Chr 12: 132.62 – 132.62 Mb	Chr 5: 110.49 – 110.49 Mb
PubMed search
- Wikidata
View/Edit Human	View/Edit Mouse

P2X purinoceptor 2 is a protein that in humans is encoded by the P2RX2 gene.

The product of this gene belongs to the family of purinoceptors for ATP. This receptor functions as a cation conducting ligand-gated ion channel. Binding to ATP mediates synaptic transmission between neurons and from neurons to smooth muscle. Six transcript variants encoding six distinct isoforms have been identified for this gene.
