= JNJ-54175446 =

Chemical compound

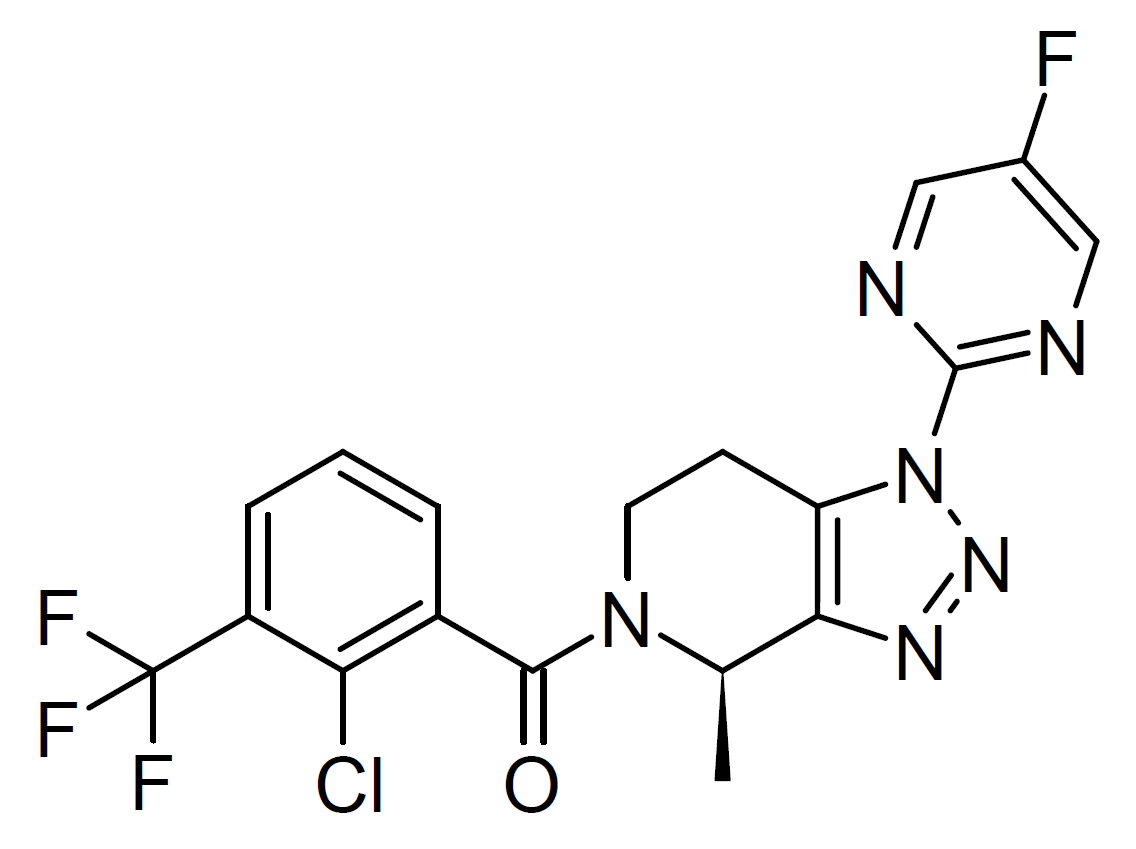

Legal status
- Legal status: Investigational New Drug

Identifiers
- IUPAC name: (R)-(2-chloro-3-(trifluoromethyl)phenyl)(1-(5-fluoropyrimidin-2-yl)-4-methyl-6,7-dihydro-1H-[1,2,3]triazolo[4,5-c]pyridin-5(4H)-yl)methanone
- CAS Number: 1627902-21-9
- PubChem CID: 90409366
- DrugBank: DB15358
- ChemSpider: 58828285
- UNII: 32524GLF40
- ChEMBL: ChEMBL4079239

Chemical and physical data
- Formula: C_{18}H_{13}ClF_{4}N_{6}O
- Molar mass: 440.79 g·mol^{−1}
- 3D model (JSmol): Interactive image
- SMILES: C[C@@H]1C2=C(CCN1C(=O)C3=C(C(=CC=C3)C(F)(F)F)Cl)N(N=N2)C4=NC=C(C=N4)F
- InChI: InChI=1S/C18H13ClF4N6O/c1-9-15-13(29(27-26-15)17-24-7-10(20)8-25-17)5-6-28(9)16(30)11-3-2-4-12(14(11)19)18(21,22)23/h2-4,7-9H,5-6H2,1H3/t9-/m1/s1; Key:CWFVVQFVGMFTBD-SECBINFHSA-N

JNJ-54175446 is an investigational P2X7 receptor antagonist developed by Janssen Pharmaceuticals. It is hoped that the drug can reduce neuroinflammation and therefore treat psychiatric disorders such as major depressive disorder.

== See also ==
- JNJ-55308942
