= P2RX5 =

Protein-coding gene in the species Homo sapiens

Identifiers
- Aliases: P2RX5, LRH-1, P2X5, P2X5R, purinergic receptor P2X 5
- External IDs: OMIM: 602836; MGI: 2137026; GeneCards: P2RX5

Gene location (Human)
Chr.	Chromosome 17 (human)
Band	17p13.2	Start	3,672,199 bp
Band	17p13.2	End	3,696,240 bp

Gene location (Mouse)
Chr.	Chromosome 11 (mouse)
Band	11|11 B4	Start	73,051,247 bp
Band	11|11 B4	End	73,063,511 bp
RNA expression pattern
Bgee	Human / Mouse (ortholog); Top expressed in: spleen; lymph node; appendix; granulocyte; mucosa of ileum; blood; apex of heart; gastrocnemius muscle; bone marrow cell; glutes / Top expressed in: brown adipose tissue; soleus muscle; masseter muscle; facial motor nucleus; ascending aorta; intercostal muscle; myocardium of ventricle; motor neuron; muscle of thigh; proximal tubule; More reference expression data
BioGPS	n/a
Gene ontology
Molecular function	ion channel activity; ATP binding; transmembrane signaling receptor activity; purinergic nucleotide receptor activity; extracellularly ATP-gated cation channel activity; ATP-gated ion channel activity
Cellular component	integral component of membrane; integral component of nuclear inner membrane; integral component of plasma membrane; membrane; plasma membrane; cytosol; postsynapse
Biological process	response to ATP; positive regulation of calcium-mediated signaling; ion transport; positive regulation of calcium ion transport into cytosol; cation transmembrane transport; signal transduction; nervous system development; blood coagulation; purinergic nucleotide receptor signaling pathway; excitatory postsynaptic potential; cation transport; ion transmembrane transport
Sources:Amigo / QuickGO
Orthologs
Databases	NCBI: entry; OMA: entry
Species	Human	Mouse
Entrez	5026	94045
Ensembl	ENSG00000083454	ENSMUSG00000005950
UniProt	Q93086	n/a
RefSeq (mRNA)	NM_175081; NM_001204519; NM_001204520; NM_002561; NM_175080	NM_033321; NM_001376982; NM_001376983
RefSeq (protein)	NP_001191448; NP_001191449; NP_002552; NP_778255	n/a
Location (UCSC)	Chr 17: 3.67 – 3.7 Mb	Chr 11: 73.05 – 73.06 Mb
PubMed search
- Wikidata
View/Edit Human	View/Edit Mouse

P2X purinoceptor 5 is a protein in humans that is encoded by the P2RX5 gene.

The product of this gene belongs to the family of purinoceptors for ATP. This receptor functions as a ligand-gated ion channel. Several characteristic motifs of ATP-gated channels are present in its primary structure, but, unlike other members of the purinoceptors family, this receptor has only a single transmembrane domain. Four transcript variants encoding distinct isoforms have been identified for this gene.

== See also ==
- P2X receptor
