= Heteromer =

A heteromer is something that consists of different parts; the antonym of homomeric. Examples are:

== Biology ==
- Spinal neurons that pass over to the opposite side of the spinal cord.
- A protein complex that contains two or more different polypeptides. More generally in molecular biology, it is a macromolecular complex, composed of at least two (functional) receptor units with biochemical properties that are demonstrably different from those of its individual components.

== Pharmacology ==
- Ligand-gated ion channels such as the nicotinic acetylcholine receptor and GABA_{A} receptor are composed of five subunits arranged around a central pore that opens to allow ions to pass through. There are many different subunits available that can come together in a wide variety of combinations to form different subtypes of the ion channel. Sometimes the channel can be made from only one type of subunit, such as the α7 nicotinic receptor, which is made up from five α7 subunits, and so is a homomer rather than a heteromer, but more commonly several different types of subunit will come together to form a heteromeric complex (e.g., the α4β2 nicotinic receptor, which is made up from two α4 subunits and three β2 subunits). Because the different ion channel subtypes are expressed to different extents in different tissues, this allows selective modulation of ion transport and means that a single neurotransmitter can produce varying effects depending on where in the body it is released.
- G protein-coupled receptors are composed of seven membrane-spanning alpha-helical segments that are usually linked together into a single folded chain to form the receptor complex. However, research has demonstrated that a number of GPCRs are also capable of forming heteromers from a combination of two or more individual GPCR subunits under some circumstances, especially where several different GPCRs are densely expressed in the same neuron. Such heteromers may be between receptors from the same family (e.g., adenosine A_{1}/A_{2A} heteromers and dopamine D_{1}/D_{2} and D_{1}/D_{3} heteromers) or between entirely unrelated receptors such as CB_{1}/A_{2A}, glutamate mGluR_{5} / adenosine A_{2A} heteromers, cannabinoid CB_{1} / dopamine D_{2} heteromers, and even CB_{1}/A_{2A}/D_{2} heterotrimers where three different receptors have come together to form a heteromer. The ligand binding properties and intracellular trafficking pathways of GPCR heteromers usually show elements from both parent receptors, but may also produce quite unexpected pharmacological effects, making such heteromers an important focus of current research.

== See also ==
- GPCR oligomer
