= Gefapixant =

Chemical compound

Clinical data
- Trade names: Lyfnua
- Other names: MK-7264
- ATC code: R05DB29 (WHO)

Legal status
- Legal status: EU: Rx-only

Identifiers
- IUPAC name: 5-(2,4-diaminopyrimidin-5-yl)oxy-2-methoxy-4-propan-2-ylbenzenesulfonamide
- CAS Number: 1015787-98-0
- PubChem CID: 24764487
- DrugBank: DB15097
- ChemSpider: 58828660
- UNII: 6K6L7E3F1L
- KEGG: D11349
- ChEMBL: ChEMBL3716057
- CompTox Dashboard (EPA): DTXSID401337212
- ECHA InfoCard: 100.258.106

Chemical and physical data
- Formula: C_{14}H_{19}N_{5}O_{4}S
- Molar mass: 353.40 g·mol^{−1}
- 3D model (JSmol): Interactive image
- SMILES: CC(C)C1=CC(=C(C=C1OC2=CN=C(N=C2N)N)S(=O)(=O)N)OC
- InChI: InChI=1S/C14H19N5O4S/c1-7(2)8-4-10(22-3)12(24(17,20)21)5-9(8)23-11-6-18-14(16)19-13(11)15/h4-7H,1-3H3,(H2,17,20,21)(H4,15,16,18,19); Key:HLWURFKMDLAKOD-UHFFFAOYSA-N

Gefapixant, sold under the brand name Lyfnua, is a medication used to treat chronic (long-term) cough. It acts as an antagonist of the P2RX3 receptor.

It was authorized for medical use in the European Union in September 2023.

== Medical uses ==
Gefapixant is indicated for the treatment of refractory or unexplained chronic cough.

== Society and culture ==
=== Names ===
It was named in honour of Geoff Burnstock.
