= P2RX6 =

Protein-coding gene in the species Homo sapiens

Identifiers
- Aliases: P2RX6, P2RXL1, P2X6, P2XM, purinergic receptor P2X 6
- External IDs: OMIM: 608077; MGI: 1337113; GeneCards: P2RX6

Gene location (Human)
| Chr. | Chromosome 22 (human) |
| Band | 22q11.21 | Start | 21,009,808 bp |
| Band | 22q11.21 | End | 21,028,013 bp |

Gene location (Mouse)
| Chr. | Chromosome 16 (mouse) |
| Band | 16|16 A3 | Start | 17,379,749 bp |
| Band | 16|16 A3 | End | 17,395,664 bp |
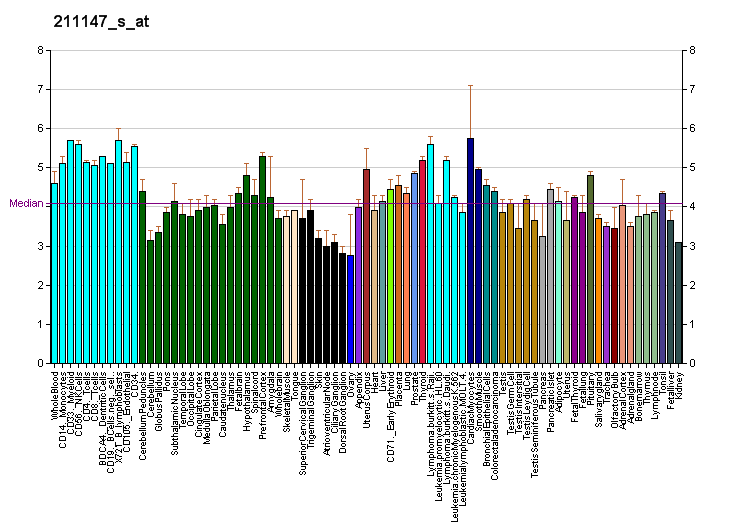

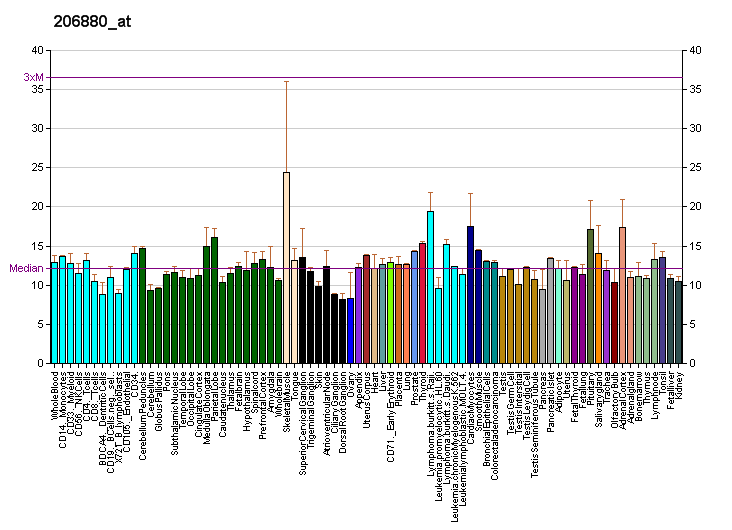
RNA expression pattern
| Bgee | Human / Mouse (ortholog); Top expressed in: gastrocnemius muscle; muscle of thigh; right frontal lobe; right uterine tube; Brodmann area 9; apex of heart; spleen; anterior cingulate cortex; anterior pituitary; prefrontal cortex / Top expressed in: facial motor nucleus; muscle of thigh; skeletal muscle tissue; soleus muscle; quadriceps femoris muscle; morula; medial head of gastrocnemius muscle; temporal muscle; masseter muscle; anterior horn of spinal cord; More reference expression data |
| BioGPS | More reference expression data |
Gene ontology
| Molecular function | channel activity; purinergic nucleotide receptor activity; extracellularly ATP-gated cation channel activity; ion channel activity; identical protein binding; ATP binding; transmembrane signaling receptor activity; ATP-gated ion channel activity |
| Cellular component | cytoplasm; integral component of membrane; membrane; integral component of nuclear inner membrane; integral component of plasma membrane; cell junction; plasma membrane; postsynapse; postsynaptic density; soma; dendritic spine; parallel fiber to Purkinje cell synapse; glutamatergic synapse; integral component of postsynaptic specialization membrane |
| Biological process | response to ATP; muscle contraction; ion transport; cation transmembrane transport; protein homooligomerization; signal transduction; blood coagulation; purinergic nucleotide receptor signaling pathway; excitatory postsynaptic potential; protein heterooligomerization; cation transport; ion transmembrane transport |
Sources:Amigo / QuickGO
Orthologs
| Databases | NCBI: entry; OMA: entry |
| Species | Human | Mouse |
| Entrez | 9127 | 18440 |
| Ensembl | ENSG00000099957 | ENSMUSG00000022758 |
| UniProt | O15547 | O54803 |
| RefSeq (mRNA) | NM_001159554; NM_005446; NM_001349874; NM_001349875; NM_001349876 NM_001394691; NM_001394692; NM_001394693; NM_001394694; NM_001394695; NM_001394696; NM_001394697 | NM_001159561; NM_011028 |
| RefSeq (protein) | NP_001153026; NP_005437; NP_001336803; NP_001336804; NP_001336805 | NP_001153033; NP_035158 |
| Location (UCSC) | Chr 22: 21.01 – 21.03 Mb | Chr 16: 17.38 – 17.4 Mb |
| PubMed search |
- Wikidata
| View/Edit Human | View/Edit Mouse |

P2X purinoceptor 6 is a protein that in humans is encoded by the P2RX6 gene.

The protein encoded by this gene belongs to the family of P2X receptors, which are ATP-gated ion channels and mediate rapid and selective permeability to cations. This gene is predominantly expressed in skeletal muscle, and regulated by p53. The encoded protein is associated with VE-cadherin at the adherens junctions of human umbilical vein endothelial cells.

== See also ==
- Purinergic receptor
