= Spinal neuron =

Component of central nervous system (CNS)

Spinal neurons are specialized nerve cells located within the spinal cord. They are a crucial component of the central nervous system. These neurons play vital roles in transmitting and processing information between the brain and the rest of the body.

== Types of Spinal Neurons ==
=== Motor Neurons ===
Motor Neurons are located in the front (ventral) horns of the spinal cord's grey matter. They carry information from the brain and spinal cord to the body's muscles. This tells our body to stimulate muscle movement.

=== Sensory Neurons ===
Sensory neurons are found in the back (dorsal) horns of the spinal cord's grey matter. The bundles of axons projected from sensory neurons make up the ascending (sensory) pathways in the spinal cord. These pathways carry sensory information from the body to the spinal cord and brain.

The sequence of the relay of information begins with the first order sensory (primary afferent) neuron, which first detects sensory information from the periphery such as touch, pressure, and pain. The cell bodies of first order sensory neurons are located in the dorsal root ganglion (DRG). The DRG is a part of the peripheral nervous system (PNS) beside the spinal cord and houses the cell bodies of the first order sensory neurons.

First order neurons terminate by synapsing with a second order sensory neuron. First order neurons associated with feeling fine touch, vibration, and body position synapse with second order neurons in the dorsal horn of the spinal cord. These second order neurons decussate at the level of the spinal cord and ascend contralaterally to make connections with third order neurons in the thalamus. First order neurons associated with pain and temperature enter the ventral horn of the spinal cord and ascend ipsilaterally until forming synapses with second order sensory neurons in the medulla. Decussation of these second order neurons thus occurs at the level of the medulla, and continue to make connections with third order neurons in the thalamus. The third order neurons located in the thalamus project their axons and synapse with sensory neurons the appropriate and corresponding areas of the somatosensory cortex.

=== Interneurons ===
Interneurons are the most abundant type of neuron in the spinal cord. They process and convey information between sensory neurons and motor neurons.

== Function and Connectivity ==
Within the spinal cord, spinal neurons organize into intricate networks that enable a variety of activities:

1. Signal Transmission: They facilitate both deliberate and involuntary movements by transmitting messages from the brain to the body.
2. Reflex Actions: include certain spinal neurons, allow for rapid, reflexive reactions to stimuli without requiring direct brain involvement.
3. Information Processing: Before sending sensory data to the brain, spinal neurons partially analyze it.
4. Synaptic Connections: Through synapses and neurotransmitters, spinal neurons exchange information with neurons in other regions of the nervous system as well as with one another.

== Spinal Cord Organizion ==
Between the brain and the body, the spinal cord is the most crucial component. From the foramen magnum, where it joins the medulla, the spinal cord reaches the first or second lumbar vertebrae. It is an essential connection between the body and the brain as well as between the two. The spinal cord has a diameter of 1 to 1.5 cm and a length of 40 to 50 cm. On either side, two successive rows of nerve roots appear. Thirty-one pairs of spinal nerves are formed by the distal union of these nerve roots.

The spinal cord is a uniformly organized, cylindrical structure of white and gray matter that is separated into four regions: cervical (C), thoracic (T), lumbar (L), and sacral (S). Each area is made up of many segments. Motor and sensory nerve fibers to and from every area of the body are found in the spinal nerve. A dermatome is innervated by each segment of the spinal cord.

The spinal cord is organized into segments, each corresponding to specific regions of the body:

- 8 cervical (neck)
- 12 thoracic (chest)
- 5 lumbar (abdominal)
- 5 sacral (pelvic)
- 1 coccygeal (tailbone)

Clinical Significance

Numerous neurological disorders can arise from damage to spinal neurons, including:

- Paralysis
- Loss of sensation
- Impaired reflexes
- Altered motor control

The location and severity of the spinal cord injury or disease determine the particular symptoms.

In order to diagnose and treat spinal cord illnesses and to create prospective treatments for spinal cord injuries, it is essential to comprehend spinal neurons and their roles.
