= Protein trimer =

Macromolecular complex formed by three macromolecules

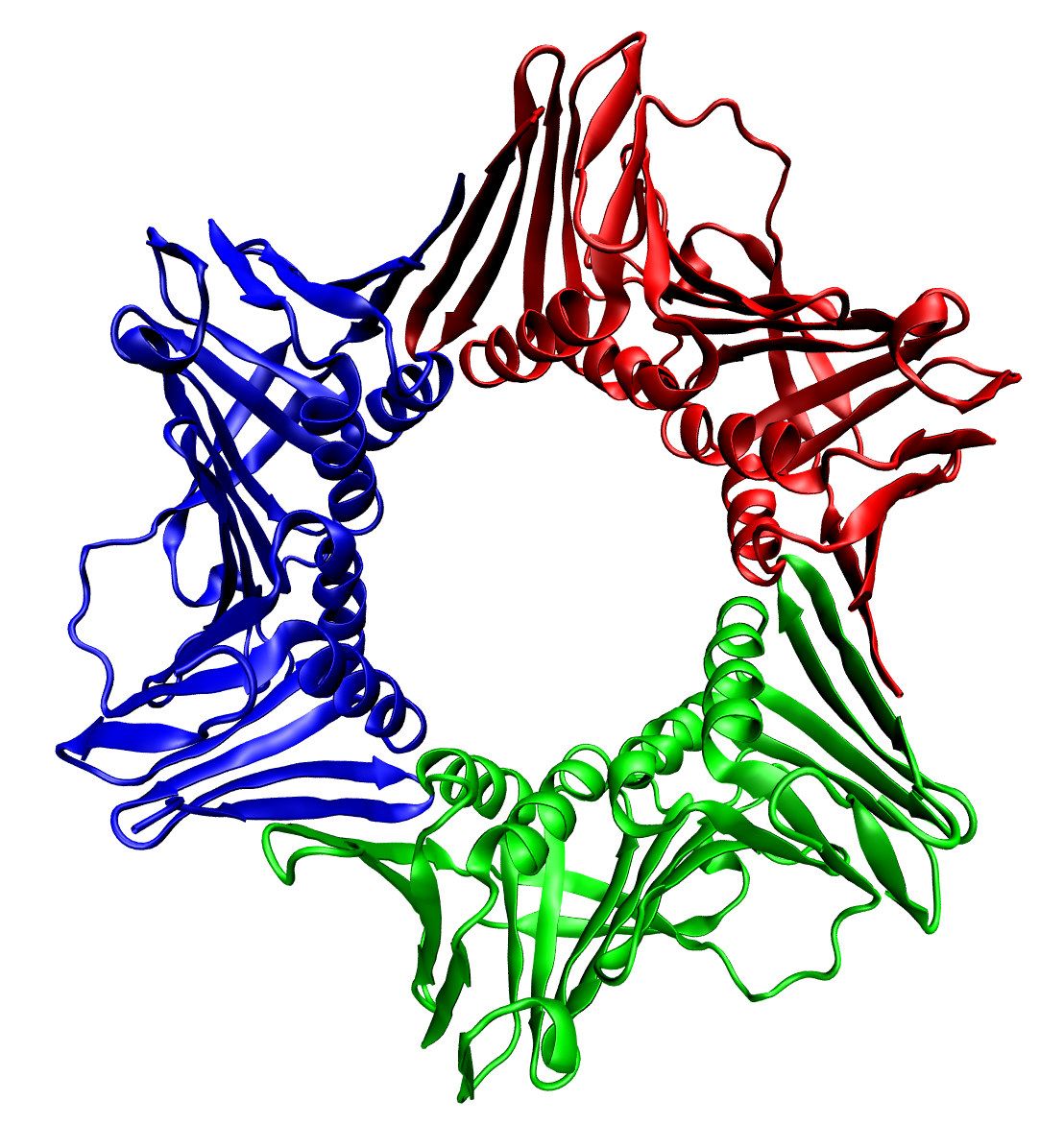
Assembled human PCNA (PDB 1AXC), a sliding DNA clamp protein that is part of the DNA replication complex and serves as a processivity factor for DNA polymerase. The three individual polypeptide chains that make up the trimer are shown.

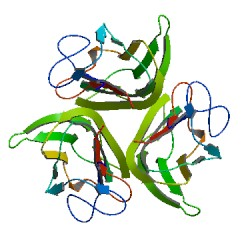
Trimeric form of a TNF-α mutant

In biochemistry, a protein trimer is a macromolecular complex formed by three, usually non-covalently bound, macromolecules like proteins or nucleic acids. A protein trimer often occurs from the assembly of a protein's quaternary structure. The non-covalent interactions between the hydrophobic and hydrophilic regions on the polypeptides units help to stabilize the quaternary structure. Since a protein trimer is composed of multiple polypeptide subunits, it is considered an oligomer.

A homotrimer would be formed by three identical molecules. A heterotrimer would be formed by three different macromolecules. Type II Collagen is an example of homotrimeric protein, while Type I collagen is an AAB-type heterotrimeric protein. An example of viral protein homotrimeric protein is mammarenavirus of Z matrix protein.

Porins usually arrange themselves in membranes as trimers.

== Bacteriophage T4 tail fiber ==
Multiple copies of a polypeptide encoded by a gene often can form an aggregate referred to as a multimer. When a multimer is formed from polypeptides produced by two different mutant alleles of a particular gene, the mixed multimer may exhibit greater functional activity than the unmixed multimers formed by each of the mutants alone. When a mixed multimer displays increased functionality relative to the unmixed multimers, the phenomenon is referred to as intragenic complementation. The distal portion of each of the bacteriophage T4 tail fibers is encoded by gene 37 and mutants defective in this gene undergo intragenic complementation. This finding indicated that the distal tail fibers are a multimer of the gene 37 encoded polypeptide. An analysis of the complementation data further indicated that the polypeptides making up the multimer were folded back on themselves in the form of a hairpin. A further high-resolution crystal structure analysis of the distal tail fiber indicated that the gene 37 polypeptides are present as a trimer and that each polypeptide of the trimer is folded back on itself in a hairpin configuration.

== See also ==
- Spike protein (coronavirus)
- Hemagglutinin (influenza)
- Oligomer
- Protein quaternary structure
- Trimer (chemistry)
