= Homomeric =

Something that is composed of one repeating subunit, the antonym of heteromeric. It is often used to describe proteins made up of multiple identical repeating polypeptide chains e.g. beta galactosidase.
