= Purinergic receptor =

Family of cell membrane receptors in almost all tissues

Purinergic receptors, also known as purinoceptors, are a family of plasma membrane molecules that are found in almost all mammalian tissues. Within the field of purinergic signalling, these receptors have been implicated in learning and memory, locomotor and feeding behavior, and sleep. More specifically, they are involved in several cellular functions, including proliferation and migration of neural stem cells, vascular reactivity, apoptosis and cytokine secretion. These functions have not been well characterized and the effect of the extracellular microenvironment on their function is also poorly understood.

Geoffrey Burnstock originally separated purinoceptors into P1 adenosine receptors and P2 nucleotide (ATP, ADP) receptors. P2 receptors were later subdivided into P2X, P2Y, P2T, and P2Z receptors. Subclasses X and Y mediated vasoconstriction and vasodilation, respectively, in the smooth muscle of some arteries. They had been observed in blood vessels, smooth muscle, heart, hepatocytes, and parotid acinar cells. Subclass T was only observed in thrombocytes, platelets and megakaryocytes. Subclass Z required ~100 μM-ATP for activation, where the previous classes required <1 μM. They had been observed in mast cells and lymphocytes.

In the early 1990s, purinoceptors were cloned and characterized, and the P2 subclasses were redefined. Now, P2 receptors are classified based on structure: P2X are ionotropic and P2Y are metabotropic. Appropriately, P2Z was reclassified as P2X7 and P2T was reclassified as P2Y1.

== 3 classes of purinergic receptors ==
Name	Activation	Class
P1 receptors	adenosine	G protein-coupled receptors
P2Y receptors	nucleotides: ATP; ADP; UTP; UDP; UDP-glucose	G protein-coupled receptors
P2X receptors	ATP	ligand-gated ion channel

There are three known distinct classes of purinergic receptors, known as P1, P2X, and P2Y receptors.

== P2X receptors ==
P2X receptors are ligand-gated ion channels, whereas the P1 and P2Y receptors are G protein-coupled receptors. These ligand-gated ion channels are nonselective cation channels responsible for mediating excitatory postsynaptic responses, similar to nicotinic and ionotropic glutamate receptors. P2X receptors are distinct from the rest of the widely known ligand-gated ion channels, as the genetic encoding of these particular channels indicates the presence of only two transmembrane domains within the channels. These receptors are greatly distributed in neurons and glial cells throughout the central and peripheral nervous systems. P2X receptors mediate a large variety of responses including fast transmission at central synapses, contraction of smooth muscle cells, platelet aggregation, macrophage activation, and apoptosis. Moreover, these receptors have been implicated in integrating functional activity between neurons, glial, and vascular cells in the central nervous system, thereby mediating the effects of neural activity during development, neurodegeneration, inflammation, and cancer. The physiological modulator Zn2+ allosterically enhances ATP-induced inward cation currents in the P2X4 receptor by binding to cysteine 132 and cystine 149 residues on the extracellular domain of the P2X4 protein.

== P2Y and P1 receptors ==
Both of these metabotropic receptors are distinguished by their reactivity to specific activators. P1 receptors are preferentially activated by adenosine and P2Y receptors are preferentially more activated by ATP. P1 and P2Y receptors are known to be widely distributed in the brain, heart, kidneys, and adipose tissue. Xanthines (e.g. caffeine) specifically block adenosine receptors, and are known to induce a stimulating effect to one's behavior.

== Inhibitors ==
Inhibitors of purinergic receptors include clopidogrel, prasugrel and ticlopidine, as well as ticagrelor. All of these are antiplatelet agents that block P2Y_{12} receptors.

== Effects on chronic pain ==
Data obtained from using P2 receptor-selective antagonists has produced evidence supporting ATP's ability to initiate and maintain chronic pain states after exposure to noxious stimuli. It is believed that ATP functions as a pronociceptive neurotransmitter, acting at specific P2X and P2Y receptors in a systemized manner, which ultimately (as a response to noxious stimuli) serve to initiate and sustain heightened states of neuronal excitability. This recent knowledge of purinergic receptors' effects on chronic pain provide promise in discovering a drug that specifically targets individual P2 receptor subtypes. While some P2 receptor-selective compounds have proven useful in preclinical trials, more research is required to understand the potential viability of P2 receptor antagonists for pain.

Recent research has identified a role for microglial P2X receptors in neuropathic pain and inflammatory pain, especially the P2X_{4} and P2X_{7} receptors.

== Effects on cytotoxic edema ==
Purinergic receptors have been suggested to play a role in the treatment of cytotoxic edema and brain infarctions. It was found that with treatment of the purinergic ligand 2-methylthioladenosine 5' diphosphate (2-MeSADP), which is an agonist and has a high preference for the purinergic receptor type 1 isoform (P2Y_{1}R), significantly contributes to the reduction of an ischemic lesions caused by cytotoxic edema. Further pharmacological evidence has suggested that 2MeSADP protection is controlled by enhanced astrocyte mitochondrial metabolism through increased inositol triphosphate-dependent calcium release. There is evidence suggesting a relationship between the levels of ATP and cytotoxic edema, where low ATP levels are associated with an increased prevalence of cytotoxic edema. It is believed that mitochondria play an essential role in the metabolism of astrocyte energy within the penumbra of ischemic lesions. By enhancing the source of ATP provided by mitochondria, there could be a similar 'protective' effect for brain injuries in general.

== Effects on diabetes ==
Purinergic receptors have been implicated in the vascular complications associated with diabetes due to the effect of high-glucose concentration on ATP-mediated responses in human fibroblasts.

== See also ==
- Purinergic signaling
