= PPADS =

Names
- IUPAC name 4-[(E)-{4-formyl-5-hydroxy-6-methyl-3-[(phosphonooxy)methyl]pyridin-2-yl}diazenyl]benzene-1,3-disulfonic acid
- Other names PPADS

Identifiers
CAS Number	149017-66-3; 192575-19-2 (tetrasodium salt)
3D model (JSmol)	Interactive image
ChEBI	CHEBI:34941
ChemSpider	20136164
PubChem CID	6093163; 6532796 (tetrasodium salt)
UNII	L6K2LJ9BJK
- InChI: InChI=1S/C14H14N3O12PS2/c1-7-13(19)9(5-18)10(6-29-30(20,21)22)14(15-7)17-16-11-3-2-8(31(23,24)25)4-12(11)32(26,27)28/h2-5,19H,6H2,1H3,(H2,20,21,22)(H,23,24,25)(H,26,27,28)/b17-16+
- SMILES: Oc2c(C=O)c(COP(O)(=O)O)c(/N=N/c1ccc(cc1S(O)(=O)=O)S(O)(=O)=O)nc2C

Properties
Chemical formula	C_{14}H_{14}N_{3}O_{12}PS_{2}
Molar mass	511.37 g·mol^{−1}
Appearance	Orange solid
Solubility in water	100 mM (tetrasodium salt)
- Except where otherwise noted, data are given for materials in their standard state (at 25 °C [77 °F], 100 kPa). Infobox references

PPADS (pyridoxalphosphate-6-azophenyl-2',4'-disulfonic acid) is a selective purinergic P2X antagonist. It is able to block contractions of rabbit vas deferens induced by ATP or α,β,methylene-ATP. It appears to be relatively selective for P2X receptors, having no appreciable activity at α_{1} adrenergic, muscarinic M_{2} and M_{3}, histamine H_{1}, and adenosine A_{1} receptors.
