= Ionotropic GABA receptor =

Ionotropic GABA receptors (iGABARs) are ligand-gated ion channel of the GABA receptors class which are activated by gamma-aminobutyric acid (GABA), and include:

- GABA_{A} receptors
- GABA_{A}-ρ receptors

The GABA_{B} receptor, a G protein-coupled receptor, is the only metabotropic GABA receptor and its mechanism of action differs significantly from the ionotropic receptors. Functionally, in mature organisms, activation of these receptors typically results in neural inhibition, primarily via the influx of chloride ions, although exceptions to this general principle exist, such as during early development. Structurally, iGABARs are pentameric transmembrane ion channels, meaning they are made up of five subunits. Since there are several classes of subunits and a variety of genes encoding many members of these classes, a wide variety of structurally, and therefore functionally, distinct channels of iGABARs is observed.

== Introduction ==
This is a neuromuscular junction, a muscle synapse. Central synapses between neurons have a similar structure. There is a presynaptic unit (axon), a synapse and a postsynaptic unit (dendrite). Neurotransmitters are released into the synapse. At the mammalian neuromuscular junction it is acetylcholine (ACh). Elsewhere in the nervous system, it can be GABA (inhibition) or glutamate (excitation), or a range of other small molecules.

The synapse in the CNS is composed of a presynaptic unit located at an axon terminal with synaptic vesicles and a postsynaptic unit located at a dendrite. Neurotransmitters are chemical molecules that are released from a presynaptic unit into the synapse and received by the postsynaptic unit, resulting in a biological and electrophysiological effect. The two main types of neurotransmitters are amino acid transmitters and GABA transmitters. The release of and binding of glutamate, an amino acid transmitter, to its respective receptor manifests in an excitatory postsynaptic potential. On the other hand, the release and binding of gamma-amino butyric acid (GABA) to the GABA receptor results in an inhibitory postsynaptic potential. The ability of the GABA receptor function rests on its molecular structure of multiple binding sites and conductance levels. These receptors are prevalent in interneurons relaying messages among various regions of the brain.

== The difference between ionotropic and metabotropic GABA receptors ==
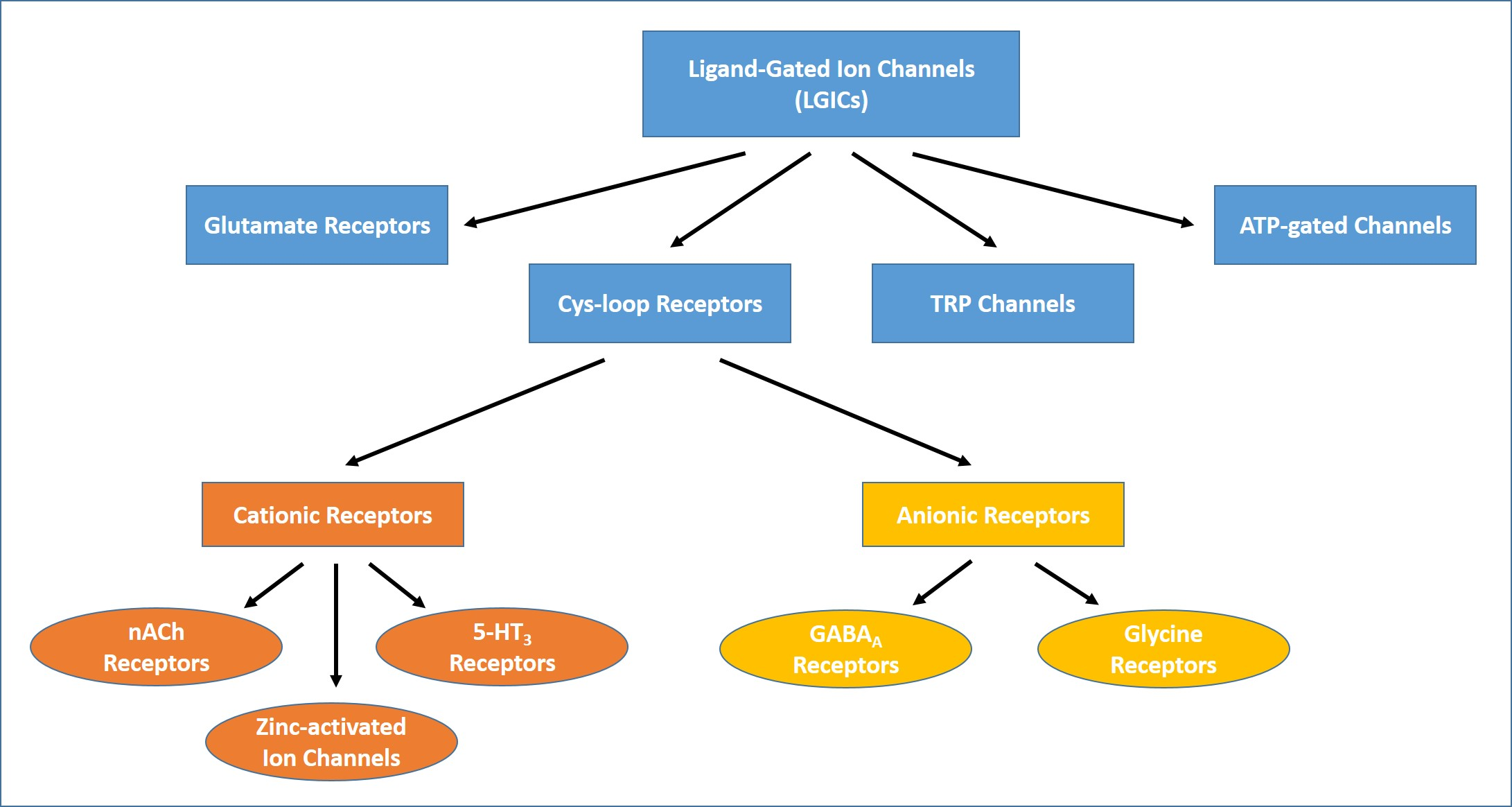
Classification of Ligand-Gated Ion Channels: iGABARs fall under the Cys-Loop receptors.

The two types of GABA receptors are the GABA_{A} and GABA_{B} receptors. The pentameric GABA_{A} receptors are ionotropic, meaning that upon binding with the ligand their biological and electrophysiological effect is carried out through the conductance of ions. This is why the physiological makeup for GABA_{A} receptors differs from GABA_{B} in that they are ligand-gated ion channels. The chloride-ion gated channels facilitate the inhibitory effect through the influx of chloride ions. However, GABA_{B} receptors are metabotropic meaning they utilize a G-protein coupled mechanism. Since the G-protein is a heterodimeric molecule, the separation and phosphorylation of its parts result in a signal cascade, resulting in a more steady but amplified response.

== Pharmacological implications ==
Earlier a third type of GABA receptor was discovered and named GABA_{C}, but recently it has been categorized as a sub-type of the GABA_{A} receptor. Thus, the ionotropic GABA receptors consist of the GABA_{A} receptor and the GABA_{A}-ρ receptor. There are pharmacological implications in understanding the molecular structure and function of these ionotropic receptors. Since they are targeted by neuroactive drugs, this characteristic is exploited in order to deduce their molecular structure and function in the CNS. For example, GABA_{A} receptors respond to neuroactive drugs like benzodiazepines. Normally increasing a neuron's permeability to chloride ions results in inhibition; benzodiazepines further propagate this event ensuring inhibition, serving as an indirect factor. Armed with the knowledge of chloride ion permeability leading to inhibition, ethanol and barbiturates can directly increase the influx of chloride ions resulting in inhibition. Further characterization of the allosteric modulations of the active sites in the ionotropic gives insight on new treatments and nervous system disorders, such as panic disorder.
