= FAM241B =

Identifiers
- Aliases: FAM241B, C10orf35, chromosome 10 open reading frame 35, family with sequence similarity 241 member B
- External IDs: MGI: 1917144; HomoloGene: 12338; GeneCards: FAM241B; OMA:FAM241B - orthologs

Gene location (Human)
Chr.	Chromosome 10 (human)
Band	10q22.1	Start	69,630,247 bp
Band	10q22.1	End	69,633,596 bp

Gene location (Mouse)
Chr.	Chromosome 10 (mouse)
Band	10|10 B4	Start	61,943,434 bp
Band	10|10 B4	End	61,979,699 bp
RNA expression pattern
Bgee	Human / Mouse (ortholog); Top expressed in: cerebellar hemisphere; right hemisphere of cerebellum; cerebellar vermis; sperm; prefrontal cortex; Brodmann area 9; right frontal lobe; pons; endothelial cell; cingulate gyrus / Top expressed in: zygote; secondary oocyte; primary oocyte; barrel cortex; motor neuron; dentate gyrus of hippocampal formation granule cell; temporal lobe; lumbar spinal ganglion; amygdala; cerebellum; More reference expression data
BioGPS	n/a
Orthologs
Species	Human	Mouse
Entrez	219738	69894
Ensembl	ENSG00000171224	ENSMUSG00000020083
UniProt	Q96D05	Q9D882
RefSeq (mRNA)	NM_145306	NM_027251; NM_001358252; NM_001358253
RefSeq (protein)	NP_660349	NP_081527; NP_001345181; NP_001345182
Location (UCSC)	Chr 10: 69.63 – 69.63 Mb	Chr 10: 61.94 – 61.98 Mb
PubMed search
- Wikidata
View/Edit Human	View/Edit Mouse

Protein FAM241B is a protein that in humans is encoded by the gene FAM241B (previously C10orf35). Not much is reported about the protein, but it is predicted to be a transmembrane protein. The protein contains the domain of unknown function 4605 (DUF4605) which belongs to the protein family pfam15378.

== General characteristics ==
The physical properties of the c10orf35 protein were analyzed, and the molecular weight was predicted to be 13.2 kdal, and the isoelectric point was predicted to be 11.5. The properties of DUF4605 were also analyzed, and the molecular weight was predicted to be 6.0 kdal. The isoelectric point was predicted to be 6.9, which is significantly less basic than the full protein.

== Properties and structure ==
This image gives a predicted image of the main secondary structure features, conserved regions, and the post-translational modification site.

DUF 4605 is located between amino acids 62 and 92. The secondary structure of the c10orf35 protein was predicted to consist of a β-sheet between amino acids 3 and 5, an α-helix between 61 and 72, and a transmembrane α-helix between 92 and 112. The serine in position 62 can be phosphorylated to form a phosphoserine group.

== Expression ==
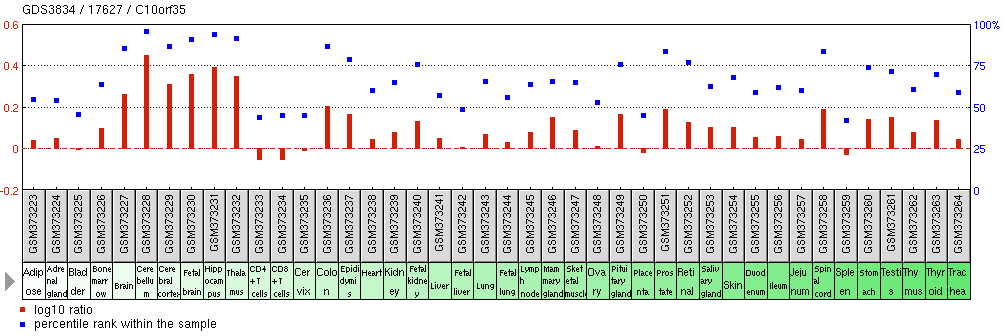
This image shows the expression of the c10orf35 protein in various human tissues.

The c10orf35 protein has expression over the 75th percentile in the brain, spinal cord, and male reproductive organs. Within the male reproductive system, the RNA is found within the testis and prostate, while the protein is expressed in the epididymis. In the brain, the RNA is found in the cerebral cortex, while the protein is expressed ubiquitously throughout the brain.

== Protein interactions ==
The c10orf35 protein has been experimentally shown by Affinity Capture-MS to interact with 7 other proteins as shown below.

Interacting Protein Symbol	Definition
ATP1B3	ATPase, Na^{+}/K^{+} Transporting, Beta 3 Polypeptide
CD3E	CD3e molecule, epsilon (CD3-TCR complex)
GABRE	Gamma-aminobutyric acid (GABA) A receptor, epsilon
HTR3C	5-hydroxytryptamine (serotonin) receptor 3C, ionotropic
LPAR1	Lysophosphatidic acid receptor 1
SGCD	Sarcoglycan, delta (35kDa dystrophin-associated glycoprotein)
ZACN	Zinc activated ligand-gated ion channel
