= GABAA receptor =

Ionotropic receptor and ligand-gated ion channel

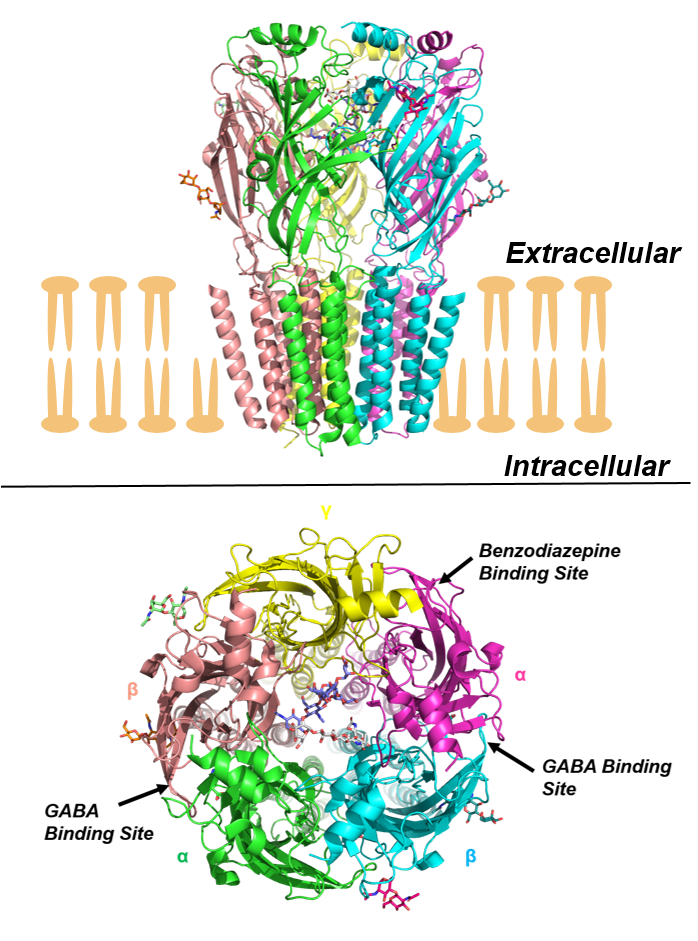
Structure of the GABA_{A} receptor (α1β1γ2S: PDB: 6DW1). Top: side view of the GABA_{A} receptor embedded in a cell membrane. Bottom: view of the receptor from the extracellular face of the membrane. The subunits are labeled according to the GABA_{A} nomenclature and the approximate locations of the GABA and benzodiazepine (BZ) binding sites are noted (between the α- and β-subunits and between the α- and γ-subunits respectively).

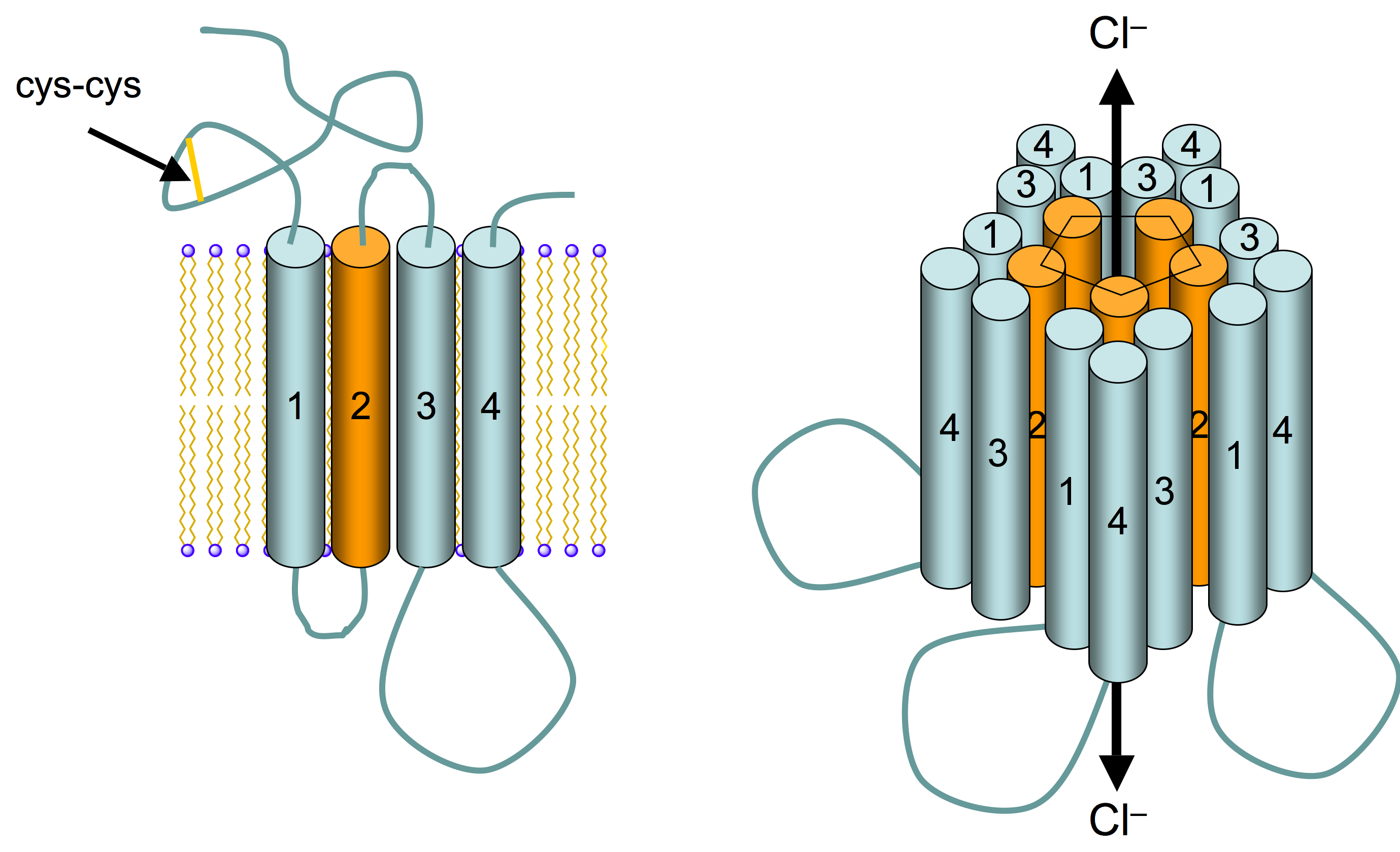
Schematic structure of the GABA_{A} receptor. Left: GABA_{A} monomeric subunit embedded in a lipid bilayer (yellow lines connected to blue spheres). The four transmembrane α-helices (1–4) are depicted as cylinders. The disulfide bond in the N-terminal extracellular domain which is characteristic of the family of cys-loop receptors (which includes the GABA_{A} receptor) is depicted as a yellow line. Right: Five subunits symmetrically arranged about the central chloride anion conduction pore. The extracellular loops are not depicted for the sake of clarity.

The GABA_{A} receptor (GABA_{A}R) is an ionotropic receptor (i.e., ligand-gated ion channel). Its endogenous ligand is γ-aminobutyric acid (GABA), the major inhibitory neurotransmitter in the central nervous system. Accurate regulation of GABAergic transmission through appropriate developmental processes, specificity to neural cell types, and responsiveness to activity is crucial for the proper functioning of nearly all aspects of the central nervous system (CNS). Upon opening, the GABA_{A} receptor on the postsynaptic cell is selectively permeable to chloride ions (Cl^{−}) and, to a lesser extent, bicarbonate ions (HCO^{−}_{3}).

GABA_{A}R are members of the ligand-gated ion channel receptor superfamily, which is a chloride channel family with a dozen or more heterotetrametric subtypes and 19 distinct subunits. These subtypes have distinct brain regional and subcellular localization, age-dependent expression, and the ability to undergo plastic alterations in response to experience, including drug exposure.

GABA_{A}R is not just the target of agonist depressants and antagonist convulsants, but most GABA_{A}R medicines also act at additional (allosteric) binding sites on GABA_{A}R proteins. Some sedatives and anxiolytics, such as benzodiazepines and related medicines, act on GABA_{A}R subtype-dependent extracellular domain sites. Alcohols and neurosteroids, among other general anesthetics, act at GABA_{A}R subunit-interface transmembrane locations. High anesthetic dosages of ethanol act on GABA_{A}R subtype-dependent transmembrane domain locations. Ethanol acts at GABA_{A}R subtype-dependent extracellular domain locations at low intoxication concentrations. Thus, GABA_{A}R subtypes have pharmacologically distinct receptor binding sites for a diverse range of therapeutically significant neuropharmacological drugs.

Depending on the membrane potential and the ionic concentration difference, this can result in ionic fluxes across the pore. If the membrane potential is higher than the equilibrium potential (also known as the reversal potential) for chloride ions, when the receptor is activated Cl^{−} will flow into the cell. This causes an inhibitory effect on neurotransmission by diminishing the chance of a successful action potential occurring at the postsynaptic cell. The reversal potential of the GABA_{A}-mediated inhibitory postsynaptic potential (IPSP) in normal solution is −70 mV, contrasting the GABA_{B} IPSP (−100 mV).

The active site of the GABA_{A} receptor is the binding site for GABA and several drugs such as muscimol, gaboxadol, and bicuculline. The protein also contains a number of different allosteric binding sites which modulate the activity of the receptor indirectly. These allosteric sites are the targets of various other drugs, including the benzodiazepines, nonbenzodiazepines, neuroactive steroids, barbiturates, alcohol (ethanol), inhaled anaesthetics, kavalactones, cicutoxin, and picrotoxin, among others.

Binding of GABA to the GABA_{A}R causes the receptor to shift from ordered lipids to clusters of PIP_{2} in the disordered region of the membrane. The spatial distribution of GABA_{A}R in neurons is regulated by astrocyte derived cholesterol.

Much like the GABA_{A} receptor, the GABA_{B} receptor is an obligatory heterodimer consisting of GABA_{B1} and GABA_{B2} subunits. These subunits include an extracellular Venus Flytrap domain (VFT) and a transmembrane domain containing seven α-helices (7TM domain). These structural components play a vital role in intricately modulating neurotransmission and interactions with drugs.

== Target for benzodiazepines ==
The ionotropic GABA_{A} receptor protein complex is also the molecular target of the benzodiazepine class of tranquilizer drugs. Benzodiazepines do not bind to the same receptor site on the protein complex as does the endogenous ligand GABA (whose binding site is located between α- and β-subunits), but bind to distinct benzodiazepine binding sites situated at the interface between the α- and γ-subunits of α- and γ-subunit containing GABA_{A} receptors. While the majority of GABA_{A} receptors (those containing α1-, α2-, α3-, or α5-subunits) are benzodiazepine sensitive, there exists a minority of GABA_{A} receptors (α4- or α6-subunit containing) which are insensitive to classical 1,4-benzodiazepines, but instead are sensitive to other classes of GABAergic drugs such as neurosteroids and alcohol. In addition peripheral benzodiazepine receptors exist which are not associated with GABA_{A} receptors. As a result, the IUPHAR has recommended that the terms "BZ receptor", "GABA/BZ receptor" and "omega receptor" no longer be used and that the term "benzodiazepine receptor" be replaced with "benzodiazepine site". Benzodiazepines like diazepam and midazolam act as positive allosteric modulators for GABA_{A} receptors. When these receptors are activated, there's a rise in intracellular chloride levels, resulting in cell membrane hyperpolarization and decreased excitation.

In order for GABA_{A} receptors to be sensitive to the action of benzodiazepines they need to contain an α and a γ subunit, between which the benzodiazepine binds. Once bound, the benzodiazepine locks the GABA_{A} receptor into a conformation where the neurotransmitter GABA has much higher affinity for the GABA_{A} receptor, increasing the frequency of opening of the associated chloride ion channel and hyperpolarising the membrane. This potentiates the inhibitory effect of the available GABA leading to sedative and anxiolytic effects.

Different benzodiazepines have different affinities for GABA_{A} receptors made up of different collection of subunits, and this means that their pharmacological profile varies with subtype selectivity. For instance, benzodiazepine receptor ligands with high activity at the α1 and/or α5 tend to be more associated with sedation, ataxia and amnesia, whereas those with higher activity at GABA_{A} receptors containing α2 and/or α3 subunits generally have greater anxiolytic activity. Anticonvulsant effects can be produced by agonists acting at any of the GABA_{A} subtypes, but current research in this area is focused mainly on producing α_{2}-selective agonists as anticonvulsants which lack the side effects of older drugs such as sedation and amnesia.

The binding site for benzodiazepines is distinct from the binding site for barbiturates and GABA on the GABA_{A} receptor, and also produces different effects on binding, with the benzodiazepines increasing the frequency of the chloride channel opening, while barbiturates increase the duration of chloride channel opening when GABA is bound. Since these are separate modulatory effects, they can both take place at the same time, and so the combination of benzodiazepines with barbiturates is strongly synergistic, and can be dangerous if dosage is not strictly controlled.

Also note that some GABA_{A} agonists such as muscimol and gaboxadol do bind to the same site on the GABA_{A} receptor complex as GABA itself, and consequently produce effects which are similar but not identical to those of positive allosteric modulators like benzodiazepines.

== Structure and function ==
Schematic diagram of a GABA_{A} receptor protein ((α1)_{2}(β2)_{2}(γ2)) which illustrates the five combined subunits that form the protein, the chloride (Cl^{−}) ion channel pore, the two GABA active binding sites at the α1 and β2 interfaces, and the benzodiazepine (BZD) allosteric binding site

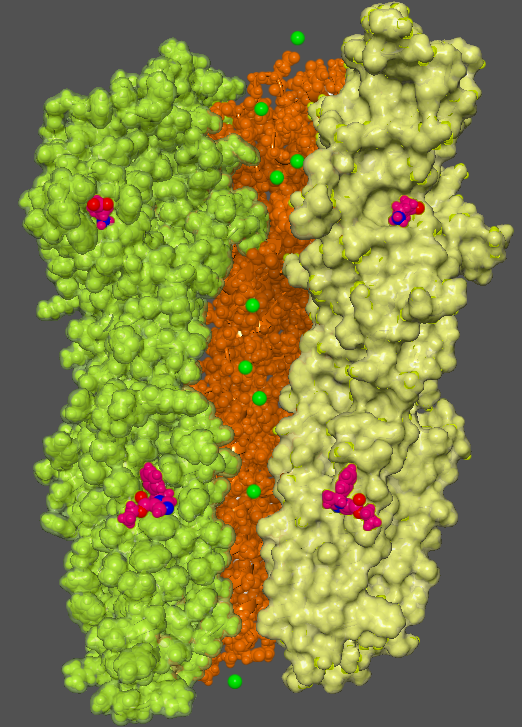
Side view of the EM structure of the α1β3γ2 GABAA receptor. GABA and the anaesthetic etomidate are coloured magenta. Subunits in different colours. One alpha and one beta subunit is hidden. Green chloride ions illustrated in the channel pore.

Structural understanding of the GABA_{A} receptor was initially based on homology models, obtained using crystal structures of homologous proteins like Acetylcholine binding protein (AChBP) and nicotinic acetylcholine (nACh) receptors as templates. The much sought structure of a GABA_{A} receptor was finally resolved, with the disclosure of the crystal structure of human β3 homopentameric GABA_{A} receptor. Whilst this was a major development, the majority of GABA_{A} receptors are heteromeric and the structure did not provide any details of the benzodiazepine binding site. This was finally elucidated in 2018 by the publication of a high resolution cryo-EM structure of rat α1β1γ2S receptor and human α1β2γ2 receptor bound with GABA and the neutral benzodiazepine flumazenil.

GABA_{A} receptors are pentameric transmembrane receptors which consist of five subunits arranged around a central pore. Each subunit comprises four transmembrane domains with both the N- and C-terminus located extracellularly. The receptor sits in the membrane of its neuron, usually localized at a synapse, postsynaptically. However, some isoforms may be found extrasynaptically. When vesicles of GABA are released presynaptically and activate the GABA receptors at the synapse, this is known as phasic inhibition. However, the GABA escaping from the synaptic cleft can activate receptors on presynaptic terminals or at neighbouring synapses on the same or adjacent neurons (a phenomenon termed 'spillover') in addition to the constant, low GABA concentrations in the extracellular space results in persistent activation of the GABA_{A} receptors known as tonic inhibition.

The ligand GABA is the endogenous compound that causes this receptor to open; once bound to GABA, the protein receptor changes conformation within the membrane, opening the pore in order to allow chloride anions (Cl^{−}) and, to a lesser extent, bicarbonate ions (HCO^{−}_{3}) to pass down their electrochemical gradient. The binding site to GABA is about 80Å away from the narrowest part of the ion channel. Recent computational studies have suggested an allosteric mechanism whereby GABA binding leads to ion channel opening. Because the reversal potential for chloride in most mature neurons is close to or more negative than the resting membrane potential, activation of GABA_{A} receptors tends to stabilize or hyperpolarise the resting potential, and can make it more difficult for excitatory neurotransmitters to depolarize the neuron and generate an action potential. The net effect therefore typically inhibitory, reducing the activity of the neuron, although depolarizing currents have been observed in response to GABA in immature neurons in early development. This effect during development is due to a modified Cl^{−} gradient wherein the anions leave the cells through the GABA_{A} receptors, since their intracellular chlorine concentration is higher than the extracellular. The difference in extracellular chlorine anion concentration is presumed to be due to the higher activity of chloride transporters, such as NKCC1, transporting chloride into cells which are present early in development, whereas, for instance, KCC2 transports chloride out of cells and is the dominant factor in establishing the chloride gradient later in development. These depolarization events have shown to be key in neuronal development. In the mature neuron, the GABA_{A} channel opens quickly and thus contributes to the early part of the inhibitory post-synaptic potential (IPSP). The endogenous ligand that binds to the benzodiazepine site is inosine.

Proper developmental, neuronal cell-type-specific, and activity-dependent GABAergic transmission control is required for nearly all aspects of CNS function.

It has been proposed that the GABAergic system is disrupted in numerous neurodevelopmental diseases, including Fragile X syndrome, Rett syndrome, and Dravet syndrome, and that it is a crucial potential target for therapeutic intervention.

=== Subunits ===
GABA_{A} receptors are members of the large pentameric ligand gated ion channel (previously referred to as "Cys-loop" receptors) super-family of evolutionarily related and structurally similar ligand-gated ion channels that also includes nicotinic acetylcholine receptors, glycine receptors, and the 5HT_{3} receptor. There are numerous subunit isoforms for the GABA_{A} receptor, which determine the receptor's agonist affinity, chance of opening, conductance, and other properties.

In humans, the units are as follows:

- six types of α subunits (GABRA1, GABRA2, GABRA3, GABRA4, GABRA5, GABRA6)
- three βs (GABRB1, GABRB2, GABRB3)
- three γs (GABRG1, GABRG2, GABRG3)
- as well as a δ (GABRD), an ε (GABRE), a π (GABRP), and a θ (GABRQ)

There are three ρ units (GABRR1, GABRR2, GABRR3); however, these do not coassemble with the classical GABA_{A} units listed above, but rather homooligomerize to form GABA_{A}-ρ receptors (formerly classified as GABA_{C} receptors but now this nomenclature has been deprecated).

=== Combinatorial arrays ===
Given the large number of GABA_{A} receptors, a great diversity of final pentameric receptor subtypes is possible. Methods to produce cell-based laboratory access to a greater number of possible GABA_{A} receptor subunit combinations allow teasing apart of the contribution of specific receptor subtypes and their physiological and pathophysiological function and role in the CNS and in disease.

=== Distribution ===
GABA_{A} receptors are responsible for most of the physiological activities of GABA in the central nervous system, and the receptor subtypes vary significantly. Subunit composition can vary widely between regions and subtypes may be associated with specific functions. The minimal requirement to produce a GABA-gated ion channel is the inclusion of an α and a β subunit. The most common GABA_{A} receptor is a pentamer comprising two α's, two β's, and a γ (α_{2}β_{2}γ). In neurons themselves, the type of GABA_{A} receptor subunits and their densities can vary between cell bodies and dendrites. Benzodiazepines and barbiturates amplify the inhibitory effects mediated by the GABAA receptor. GABA_{A} receptors can also be found in other tissues, including leydig cells, placenta, immune cells, liver, bone growth plates and several other endocrine tissues. Subunit expression varies between 'normal' tissue and malignancies, as GABA_{A} receptors can influence cell proliferation.

Distribution of Receptor Types
Isoform	Synaptic/Extrasynaptic	Anatomical location
α1β3γ2S	Both	Widespread
α2β3γ2S	Both	Widespread
α3β3γ2S	Both	Reticular thalamic nucleus
α4β3γ2S	Both	Thalamic relay cells
α5β3γ2S	Both	Hippocampal pyramidal cells
α6β3γ2S	Both	Cerebellar granule cells
α1β2γ2S	Both	Widespread, most abundant
α4β3δ	Extrasynaptic	Thalamic relay cells
α6β3δ	Extrasynaptic	Cerebellar granule cells
α1β2	Extrasynaptic	Widespread
α1β3	Extrasynaptic	Thalamus, hypothalamus
α1β2δ	Extrasynaptic	Hippocampus
α4β2δ	Extrasynaptic	Hippocampus, Prefrontal cortex
α3β3θ	Extrasynaptic	Hypothalamus
α3β3ε	Extrasynaptic	Hypothalamus

== Ligands ==
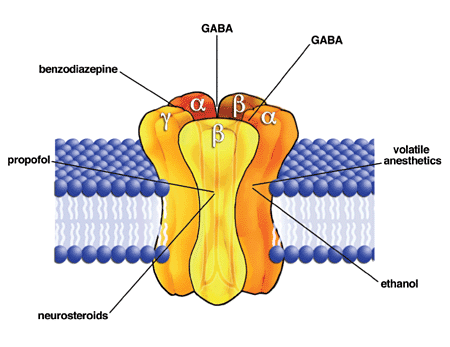
GABA_{A} receptor and where various ligands bind

A number of ligands have been found to bind to various sites on the GABA_{A} receptor complex and modulate it besides GABA itself. A ligand can possess one or more properties of the following types. Unfortunately the literature often does not distinguish these types properly.

=== Types ===
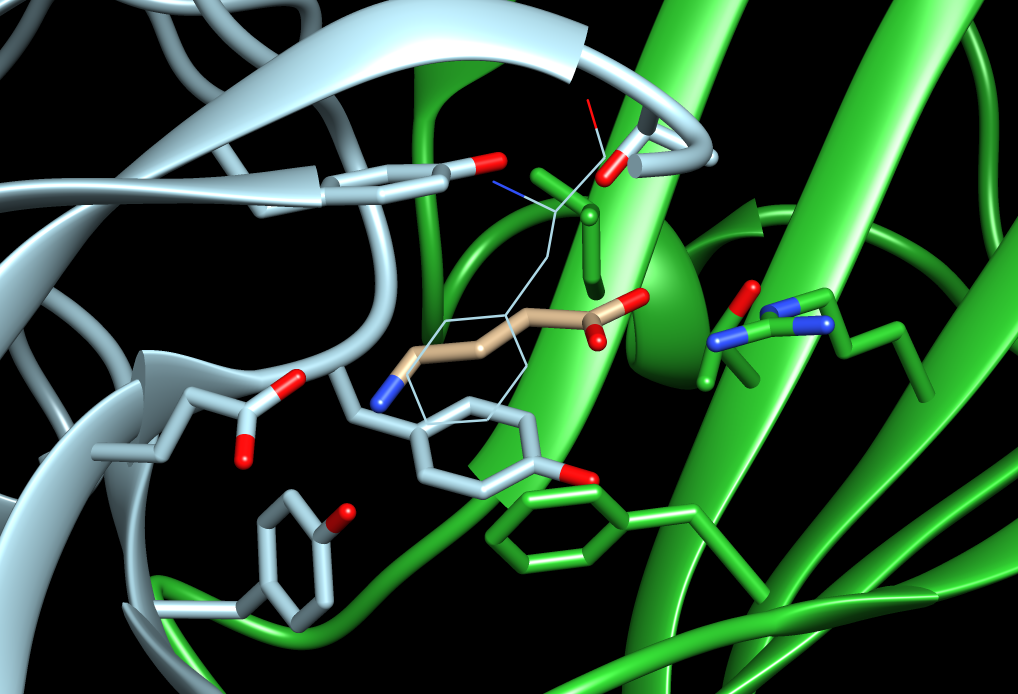
GABA bound at its orthosteric site in the beta-alpha interface of an α1β2γ2 GABAA receptor. H-atoms hidden.

- Orthosteric agonists and antagonists: bind to the main receptor site (the site where GABA normally binds, also referred to as the "active" or "orthosteric" site). Agonists activate the receptor, resulting in increased Cl^{−} conductance. Antagonists, though they have no effect on their own, compete with GABA for binding and thereby inhibit its action, resulting in decreased Cl^{−} conductance.
- First order allosteric modulators: bind to allosteric sites on the receptor complex and affect it either in a positive (PAM), negative (NAM) or neutral/silent (SAM) manner, causing increased or decreased efficiency of the main site and therefore an indirect increase or decrease in Cl^{−} conductance. SAMs do not affect the conductance, but occupy the binding site. The first demonstration that endogenous steroid metabolites act as potent allosteric modulators of the GABAA receptor was published in Science in 1986 by the NIMH group of Majewska et al.. This work showed that certain pregnane steroids function as positive allosteric modulators (PAMs), enhancing GABAergic inhibition in a barbiturate-like manner, while pregnenolone sulfate acts as a negative allosteric modulator (NAM). These findings established neuroactive steroids as a distinct class of GABAA receptor modulators.
- Second order modulators: bind to an allosteric site on the receptor complex and modulate the effect of first order modulators.
- Open channel blockers: prolong ligand-receptor occupancy, activation kinetics and Cl ion flux in a subunit configuration-dependent and sensitization-state dependent manner.
- Non-competitive channel blockers: bind to or near the central pore of the receptor complex and directly block Cl^{−} conductance through the ion channel.

=== Examples ===
- Orthosteric agonists: GABA, gaboxadol, isoguvacine, muscimol, progabide, beta-alanine, taurine, piperidine-4-sulfonic acid (partial agonist).
- Orthosteric antagonists: bicuculline, gabazine.
- Positive allosteric modulators: abecarnil, azocarnil (photoswitchable), barbiturates, benzodiazepines, certain carbamates (e.g., carisoprodol, meprobamate, lorbamate), honokiol, magnolol, baicalin, baicelin, thienodiazepines, alcohol (ethanol), etomidate, glutethimide, kavalactones, meprobamate, quinazolinones (e.g., methaqualone, etaqualone, diproqualone), neuroactive steroids, niacin/niacinamide, nonbenzodiazepines (e.g., zolpidem, eszopiclone), propofol, stiripentol, theanine, valerenic acid, volatile/inhaled anesthetics, lanthanum, riluzole, and menthol.
- Negative allosteric modulators: flumazenil, Ro15-4513, sarmazenil, pregnenolone sulfate, amentoflavone, and zinc.
- Inverse allosteric agonists: beta-carbolines (e.g., harmine, harmaline, tetrahydroharmine).
- Second-order modulators: (−)‐epigallocatechin‐3‐gallate.
- Non-competitive channel blockers: cicutoxin, oenanthotoxin, pentylenetetrazol, picrotoxin, thujone, and lindane.

=== Effects ===
Ligands which contribute to receptor activation typically have anxiolytic, anticonvulsant, amnesic, sedative, hypnotic, euphoriant, and muscle relaxant properties. Some such as muscimol and the z-drugs may also be hallucinogenic. Ligands which decrease receptor activation usually have opposite effects, including anxiogenesis and convulsion. Some of the subtype-selective negative allosteric modulators such as α_{5}IA are being investigated for their nootropic effects, as well as treatments for the unwanted side effects of other GABAergic drugs. Advances in molecular pharmacology and genetic manipulation of rat genes have revealed that distinct subtypes of the GABA_{A} receptor mediate certain parts of the anaesthetic behavioral repertoire.

=== Novel drugs ===
A useful property of the many benzodiazepine site allosteric modulators is that they may display selective binding to particular subsets of receptors comprising specific subunits. This allows one to determine which GABA_{A} receptor subunit combinations are prevalent in particular brain areas and provides a clue as to which subunit combinations may be responsible for behavioral effects of drugs acting at GABA_{A} receptors. These selective ligands may have pharmacological advantages in that they may allow dissociation of desired therapeutic effects from undesirable side effects. Few subtype selective ligands have gone into clinical use as yet, with the exception of zolpidem which is reasonably selective for α_{1}, but several more selective compounds are in development such as the α_{3}-selective drug adipiplon. There are many examples of subtype-selective compounds which are widely used in scientific research, including:

- CL-218,872 (highly α_{1}-selective agonist)
- bretazenil (subtype-selective partial agonist)
- imidazenil and L-838,417 (both partial agonists at some subtypes, but weak antagonists at others)
- QH-ii-066 (full agonist highly selective for α_{5} subtype)
- NTX-1955 (RO-7308480) (selective γ_{1} positive allosteric modulator; classical benzodiazepines are selective γ_{2} positive allosteric modulators)
- α_{5}IA (selective inverse agonist for α_{5} subtype)
- SL-651,498 (full agonist at α_{2} and α_{3} subtypes, and as a partial agonist at α_{1} and α_{5}
- 3-acyl-4-quinolones: selective for α_{1} over α_{3}

=== Paradoxical reactions ===
There are multiple indications that paradoxical reactions upon—for example—benzodiazepines, barbiturates, inhalational anesthetics, propofol, neurosteroids, and alcohol are associated with structural deviations of GABA_{A} receptors. The combination of the five subunits of the receptor (see images above) can be altered in such a way that for example the receptor's response to GABA remains unchanged but the response to one of the named substances is dramatically different from the normal one.

There are estimates that about 2–3% of the general population may suffer from serious emotional disorders due to such receptor deviations, with up to 20% suffering from moderate disorders of this kind. It is generally assumed that the receptor alterations are, at least partly, due to genetic and also epigenetic deviations. There are indication that the latter may be triggered by, among other factors, social stress or occupational burnout.

== See also ==
- 4-Iodopropofol
- GABA receptor
- GABA_{B} receptor
- GABA_{A}-ρ receptor
- Gephyrin
- Glycine receptor
- GABA_{A} receptor agonist
- GABA_{A} receptor positive allosteric modulator
- GABA_{A} receptor negative allosteric modulator
