= NTX-1955 =

Clinical data
- Other names: NTX1955; RO-7308480; RO7308480
- Routes of administration: Oral
- Drug class: γ_{1} subunit-containing GABA_{A} receptor positive allosteric modulator

NTX-1955, also known as RO-7308480, is a selective γ_{1} subunit-containing GABA_{A} receptor positive allosteric modulator which is under development for the treatment of generalized anxiety disorder. It is taken orally.

Classical benzodiazepines are GABA_{A} receptor positive allosteric modulators that act mainly upon γ_{2} subunit-containing GABA_{A} receptors. GABA_{A} receptor γ_{2} subunits are the most abundantly expressed GABA_{A} receptor subunits in the brain and are present in at least 90% of all GABA_{A} receptors in the forebrain. Moreover, they show high expression in the amygdala and have been extensively implicated in suppressing anxiety via actions in this area. Conversely, NTX-1955 is a selective positive allosteric modulator of γ_{1} subunit-containing GABA_{A} receptors. Though γ_{2} subunit-containing GABA_{A} receptors are dominant in this area, γ_{1} subunit-containing GABA_{A} receptors are also highly expressed in the central amygdala, and selective positive allosteric modulators of these receptors have been found to produce anxiolytic-like effects without side effects like sedation and cognitive and motor impairment in animals. As such, it is thought that selectivity for γ_{1} subunit-containing GABA_{A} receptors may confer improved tolerability compared to existing drugs like benzodiazepines. Due to its novel mechanism of action, NTX-1955 is a potential first-in-class medication.

NTX-1955 was originated by Roche and is under development by Newleos Therapeutics. As of April 2026, it is in phase 1 clinical trials for generalized anxiety disorder, with several phase 1 trials having been completed. There was also interest in NTX-1955 for potential treatment of social anxiety disorder. The chemical structure of NTX-1955 does not yet appear to have been disclosed, but it is said to be structurally related to benzodiazepines.

== See also ==
- List of investigational generalized anxiety disorder drugs
- ENX-102 (TPA-023B)
