= R-96544 =

Clinical data
- Other names: R96544; R-96,544; MPM
- Drug class: Serotonin 5-HT_{2A} receptor antagonist
- ATC code: None

Identifiers
- IUPAC name: (3R,5R)-5-[2-[2-[2-(3-methoxyphenyl)ethyl]phenoxy]ethyl]-1-methylpyrrolidin-3-ol
- CAS Number: 167144-79-8
- PubChem CID: 10668211
- ChemSpider: 8843563
- ChEBI: CHEBI:92282
- ChEMBL: ChEMBL1619948

Chemical and physical data
- Formula: C_{22}H_{29}NO_{3}
- Molar mass: 355.478 g·mol^{−1}
- 3D model (JSmol): Interactive image
- SMILES: CN1C[C@@H](C[C@H]1CCOC2=CC=CC=C2CCC3=CC(=CC=C3)OC)O
- InChI: InChI=1S/C22H29NO3/c1-23-16-20(24)15-19(23)12-13-26-22-9-4-3-7-18(22)11-10-17-6-5-8-21(14-17)25-2/h3-9,14,19-20,24H,10-13,15-16H2,1-2H3/t19-,20-/m1/s1; Key:AFZLABYDOCWQBQ-WOJBJXKFSA-N

R-96544, also known as MPM, is a serotonin 5-HT_{2A} receptor antagonist which is used in scientific research. It is also the active form of the laurate (dodecanoate) ester prodrug R-102444, which was investigated for potential medical use but was never marketed.

R-96544 shows high affinity for the serotonin 5-HT_{2A} receptor (K_{i} = 1.6 nM) and is selective for this receptor over various other targets. However, one exception is that it shows only 4-fold lower affinity for the serotonin 5-HT_{2C} receptor relative to the serotonin 5-HT_{2A} receptor. The drug inhibits serotonin-induced platelet aggregation in preclinical research and hence has antiplatelet effects. It also inhibits the pressor effects of serotonin in rodents. R-96544 is effective as a treatment in animal models of peripheral vascular disease and pancreatitis. It can attenuate the bradycardia induced by activation of the Bezold–Jarisch reflex by the serotonin 5-HT_{3} receptor agonist phenylbiguanide in rodents.

R-96544, similarly to other serotonin 5-HT_{2A} receptor antagonists like ketanserin and ritanserin, blocks the hyperthermia induced by MDMA in rodents. It inhibits ethanol self-administration in rodents. On the other hand, the drug does not affect intracranial self-stimulation (ICSS) in rodents, though it can reverse the suppression of ICSS induced by the serotonin 5-HT_{2A} receptor agonist TCB-2 and by the serotonin 5-HT_{2C} receptor agonist WAY-161503. R-96544 has been found to facilitate long-term potentiation (LTP) in the anterior cingulate cortex (ACC) ex vivo. Application of R-96544 directly to certain brain areas has been found to inhibit fear- and seizure-induced analgesia in rodents. It inhibits the weight loss induced by the GLP-1 receptor agonist exendin-4 (EX4) in rodents, which appeared to be due specifically due to serotonin 5-HT_{2A} receptor antagonism rather than due to actions at the serotonin 5-HT_{2C} receptor.

The chemical synthesis of R-96544 has been described. A radiolabeled form of R-96544, known as [^{11}C]MPM, has been studied as a positron emission tomography (PET) imaging tracer.

R-96544 was first described in the scientific literature by Naoki Tanaka and colleagues by 2000.

== See also ==
- Serotonin 5-HT_{2A} receptor antagonist
- R-102444
- Sarpogrelate
