= C4H7NO2 =

The molecular formula C_{4}H_{7}NO_{2} may refer to:

- (Z)-4-Amino-2-butenoic acid
- 1-Aminocyclopropane-1-carboxylic acid
- Azetidine-2-carboxylic acid
- Diacetyl monoxime
- Acetoacetamide
