= C22H29NO3 =

The molecular formula C_{22}H_{29}NO_{3} may refer to:

- Cyprodime, an opioid antagonist from the morphinan family
- Norethisterone acetate oxime, a steroidal progestin of the 19-nortestosterone group
- R-96544
