= C18H21N3O2 =

The molecular formula C_{18}H_{21}N_{3}O_{2} (molar mass: 311.378 g/mol) may refer to:

- Lysergic acid hydroxyethylamide
- RS-56812
