= GABRQ =

Protein-coding gene in humans

Identifiers
- Aliases: GABRQ, THETA, gamma-aminobutyric acid type A receptor theta subunit, gamma-aminobutyric acid type A receptor subunit theta
- External IDs: OMIM: 300349; MGI: 1888498; GeneCards: GABRQ

Gene location (Human)
Chr.	X chromosome (human)
Band	Xq28	Start	152,637,895 bp
Band	Xq28	End	152,657,542 bp

Gene location (Mouse)
Chr.	X chromosome (mouse)
Band	X|X A7.3	Start	71,868,784 bp
Band	X|X A7.3	End	71,886,208 bp
RNA expression pattern
Bgee	Human / Mouse (ortholog); Top expressed in: hypothalamus; gonad; tibialis anterior muscle; anterior cingulate cortex; amygdala; hippocampus proper; superior vestibular nucleus; ectocervix; canal of the cervix; prefrontal cortex / Top expressed in: secondary oocyte; zygote; ventromedial nucleus; dorsomedial hypothalamic nucleus; arcuate nucleus; superior frontal gyrus; lateral hypothalamus; cerebellar cortex; median eminence; supraoptic nucleus; More reference expression data
BioGPS	n/a
Gene ontology
Molecular function	GABA-A receptor activity; neurotransmitter transmembrane transporter activity; chloride channel activity; extracellular ligand-gated ion channel activity; ion channel activity; transmembrane signaling receptor activity
Cellular component	integral component of membrane; GABA-A receptor complex; postsynaptic membrane; membrane; receptor complex; plasma membrane; synapse; integral component of plasma membrane; chloride channel complex; cell junction; neuron projection
Biological process	chloride transmembrane transport; ion transport; chloride transport; signal transduction; neurotransmitter transport; ion transmembrane transport; chemical synaptic transmission; regulation of membrane potential; nervous system process
Sources:Amigo / QuickGO
Orthologs
Databases	NCBI: entry; OMA: entry
Species	Human	Mouse
Entrez	55879	57249
Ensembl	ENSG00000268089	ENSMUSG00000031344
UniProt	Q9UN88	Q9JLF1
RefSeq (mRNA)	NM_018558	NM_001290435; NM_020488
RefSeq (protein)	NP_061028	NP_001277364; NP_065234
Location (UCSC)	Chr X: 152.64 – 152.66 Mb	Chr X: 71.87 – 71.89 Mb
PubMed search
- Wikidata
View/Edit Human	View/Edit Mouse

Gamma-aminobutyric acid receptor subunit theta is a protein that in humans is encoded by the GABRQ gene. The protein encoded by this gene is a subunit of the GABAA receptor.

The θ subunit has highest sequence similarity with the β1 subunit. This subunit coassembles with:

- α2, β1, and γ1
- α3 and β1
- α3, β1, and ε.
