= R-102444 =

Clinical data
- Other names: R102444; R-102,444; R-96544 prodrug
- Routes of administration: Unspecified
- Drug class: Serotonin 5-HT_{2} receptor antagonist; Serotonin 5-HT_{2A} receptor antagonist
- ATC code: None

Identifiers
- IUPAC name: [(3R,5R)-5-[2-[2-[2-(3-methoxyphenyl)ethyl]phenoxy]ethyl]-1-methylpyrrolidin-3-yl] dodecanoate
- CAS Number: 191155-65-4
- PubChem CID: 10256696
- ChemSpider: 8432179
- UNII: MSQ4Y6W7VA

Chemical and physical data
- Formula: C_{34}H_{51}NO_{4}
- Molar mass: 537.785 g·mol^{−1}
- 3D model (JSmol): Interactive image
- SMILES: CCCCCCCCCCCC(=O)O[C@@H]1C[C@H](N(C1)C)CCOC2=CC=CC=C2CCC3=CC(=CC=C3)OC
- InChI: InChI=1S/C34H51NO4/c1-4-5-6-7-8-9-10-11-12-20-34(36)39-32-26-30(35(2)27-32)23-24-38-33-19-14-13-17-29(33)22-21-28-16-15-18-31(25-28)37-3/h13-19,25,30,32H,4-12,20-24,26-27H2,1-3H3/t30-,32-/m1/s1; Key:ZVCROHONSVCKKH-XLJNKUFUSA-N

R-102444 is a serotonin 5-HT_{2} receptor antagonist which was under development for the treatment of peripheral arterial occlusive disorders and pancreatitis. It is a laurate (dodecanoate) ester prodrug of R-96544.

The drug has been found to inhibit serotonin-induced platelet aggregation and to have antithrombotic effects in preclinical research. The active form, R-96544, shows selectivity for the serotonin 5-HT_{2A} receptor over other targets, including the serotonin 5-HT_{1}, 5-HT_{2B}, and 5-HT_{3} receptors as well as the dopamine D_{2} receptor and adrenergic receptors, among others. However, it also showed high affinity for the serotonin 5-HT_{2C} receptor, which was about 4-fold less than for the serotonin 5-HT_{2A} receptor.

R-102444 was developed by Daiichi Sankyo Company. It reached the preclinical research stage of development prior to its discontinuation. R-102444 was first described in the scientific literature by Naoki Tanaka and colleagues by 2000.

== See also ==
- Serotonin 5-HT_{2A} receptor antagonist
- R-96544
- Sarpogrelate
