= Gabre =

Gabre may refer to:

== People ==
- Eleni Gabre-Madhin, Ethiopian economist
- Gabre Gabric, Italian track and field athlete
- Gabre Heard, Ethiopian general
- Tsegaye Gabre-Medhin (1936–2006), Ethiopian poet, playwright and art director

== Places ==
- Gabre, Ariège, commune in the Ariège department in southwestern France

== Other ==
- GABRE, gene that codes for the Gamma-aminobutyric acid receptor subunit epsilon protein
