= Cys-loop receptor =

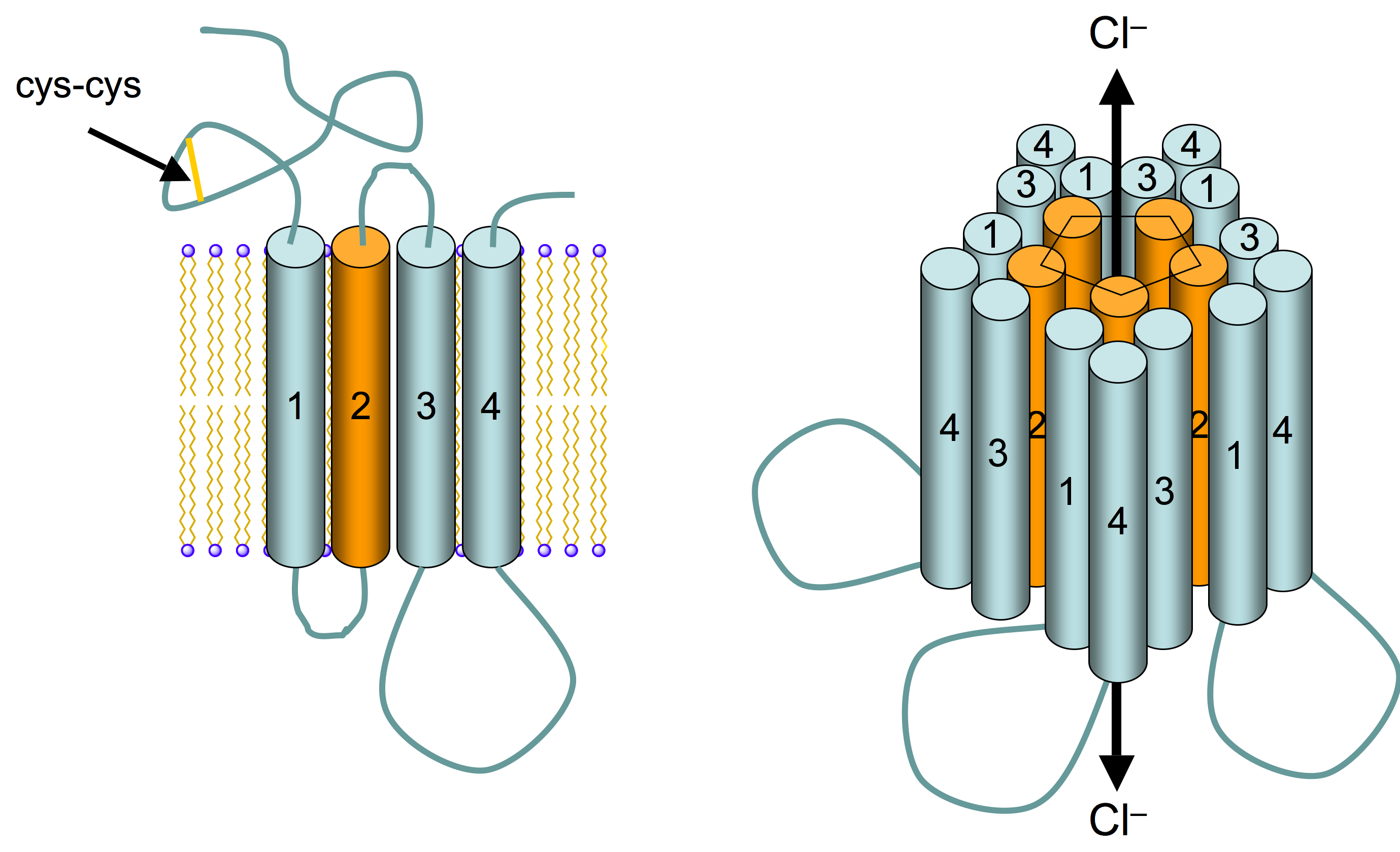
Schematic structure of the GABAA receptor

The Cys-loop ligand-gated ion channel superfamily is composed of nicotinic acetylcholine, GABA_{A}, GABA_{A}-ρ, glycine, 5-HT_{3}, and zinc-activated (ZAC) receptors. These receptors are composed of five protein subunits which form a pentameric arrangement around a central pore. There are usually 2 alpha subunits and 3 other beta, gamma, or delta subunits (some consist of 5 alpha subunits).

The name of the family refers to a characteristic loop formed by 13 highly conserved amino acids between two cysteine (Cys) residues, which form a disulfide bond near the N-terminal extracellular domain.

Cys-loop receptors are known only in eukaryotes, but are part of a larger family of pentameric ligand-gated ion channels. Only the Cys-loop clade includes the pair of bridging cysteine residues. The larger superfamily includes bacterial (e.g. GLIC) as well as non-Cys-loop eukaryotic receptors, and is referred to as "pentameric ligand-gated ion channels", or "Pro-loop receptors".

All subunits consist of a large conserved extracellular N-terminal domain, three highly conserved transmembrane domains, a cytoplasmic loop of variable size and amino acid sequence, and a fourth transmembrane region with a relatively short and variable extracellular C-terminal domain. Neurotransmitters bind at the interface between subunits in the extracellular domain.

Each subunit contains four membrane-spanning alpha helices (M1, M2, M3, M4). The pore is formed primarily by the M2 helices. The M3-M4 linker is the intracellular domain that binds the cytoskeleton.

== Binding ==
Most knowledge about cys-loop receptors comes from inferences made while studying various members of the family. Research on the structures of acetylcholine binding proteins (AChBP) determined that the binding sites consist of six loops, with the first three forming the principal face and the next three forming the complementary face. The last loop on the principal face wraps over the ligand in the active receptor. This site is also abundant in aromatic residues.

Recent literature indicates that the tryptophan residue on loop B is crucial for both agonist and antagonist binding. The neurotransmitter is taken into the binding site where it interacts (through hydrogen and cation-π bonding) with the amino acid residues in the aromatic box, located on the principal face of the binding site. Another essential interaction occurs between the agonist and a tyrosine on loop C. Upon interaction, the loop undergoes a conformational change and rotates down to cap the molecule in the binding site.

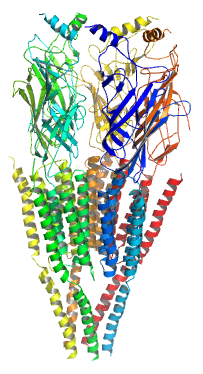
Image of nicotinic acetylcholine receptor - the most commonly studied member of the Cys-Loop receptor superfamily

== Channel gating ==
Through research done on nicotinic acetylcholine receptors it has been determined that the channels are activated through allosteric interactions between the binding and gating domains. Once the agonist binds it brings about conformational changes (including moving a beta sheet of the amino-terminal domain, and outward movement from loops 2, F and cys-loop which are tied to the M2-M3 linker and pull the channel open). Electron microscopy (at 9 Å) shows that the opening is caused by rotation at the M2 domain, but other studies on crystal structures of these receptors has shown that the opening could be a result from a M2 tilt which leads to pore dilation and a quaternary turn of the entire pentameric receptor.

== See also ==
- Ion channel
- Nicotinic agonists
- Receptor (biochemistry)
