= AS-8112 =

Names
- Preferred IUPAC name 5-Bromo-N-[(6R)-1-ethyl-4-methyl-1,4-diazepan-6-yl]-2-methoxy-4-(methylamino)benzamide

Identifiers
3D model (JSmol)	Interactive image; Interactive image
ChemSpider	9168209
DrugBank	DB09207
PubChem CID	10993014
- InChI: InChI=1S/C17H27BrN4O2/c1-5-22-7-6-21(3)10-12(11-22)20-17(23)13-8-14(18)15(19-2)9-16(13)24-4/h8-9,12,19H,5-7,10-11H2,1-4H3,(H,20,23)/t12-/m1/s1 Key: DALSFUWTAOKVTF-GFCCVEGCSA-N
- SMILES: CCN2CCN(C)CC(C2)NC(=O)c1cc(Br)c(NC)cc1OC; CCN1CCN(CC(C1)NC(=O)c2cc(c(cc2OC)NC)Br)C

Properties
Chemical formula	C_{17}H_{27}BrN_{4}O_{2}
Molar mass	399.325 g/mol
- Except where otherwise noted, data are given for materials in their standard state (at 25 °C [77 °F], 100 kPa). verify (what is ?) Infobox references

AS-8112 is a synthetic compound that acts as a selective antagonist at the dopamine receptor subtypes D_{2} and D_{3}, and the serotonin receptor 5-HT_{3}. It has potent antiemetic effects in animal studies and has been investigated for potential medical use.
