= GLIC =

The GLIC receptor is a bacterial (Gloeobacter) Ligand-gated Ion Channel, homolog to the nicotinic acetylcholine receptors. It is a proton-gated (the channel opens when it binds a proton, H^{+} ion), cation-selective channel (it selectively lets the positive ions through). Like the nicotinic acetylcholine receptors is a functional pentameric oligomer (the channel normally works as an assembly of five subunits). However while its eukaryotic homologues are hetero-oligomeric (assembled from different subunits), all until now known bacteria known to express LICs encode a single monomeric unit, indicating the GLIC to be functionally homo-oligomeric (assembled from identical subunits).

The similarity of amino-acid sequence to the eukaryotic LGICs is not localized to any single or particular tertiary domain, indicating the similar function of the GLIC to its eukaryotic equivalents. Regardless, the purpose of regulating the threshold for action potential excitation in the nerve signal transmission of multicellular organisms cannot translate to single-cell organisms, thereby not making the purpose of bacterial LGICs immediately obvious.

== Structure ==
The structure of the open channel structure was solved by two independent research teams in 2009 at low pH values of 4-4.6 (GLIC being proton-gated).

== See also ==
- Cys-loop receptors
- Ion channel
- Receptor (biochemistry)
