= HTR3A =

Protein-coding gene in the species Homo sapiens

Identifiers
- Aliases: HTR3A, 5-HT-3, 5-HT3A, 5-HT3R, 5HT3R, HTR3, 5-hydroxytryptamine receptor 3A
- External IDs: OMIM: 182139; MGI: 96282; GeneCards: HTR3A
Available structures
PDB	Ortholog search: PDBe RCSB
PDB	List of PDB id codes 4PIR

Gene location (Human)
Chr.	Chromosome 11 (human)
Band	11q23.2	Start	113,975,075 bp
Band	11q23.2	End	113,990,313 bp

Gene location (Mouse)
Chr.	Chromosome 9 (mouse)
Band	9|9 A5.3	Start	48,810,513 bp
Band	9|9 A5.3	End	48,822,399 bp
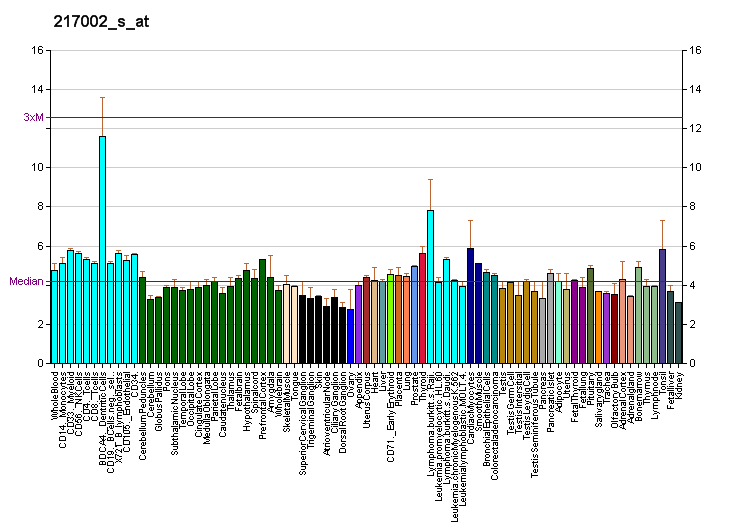

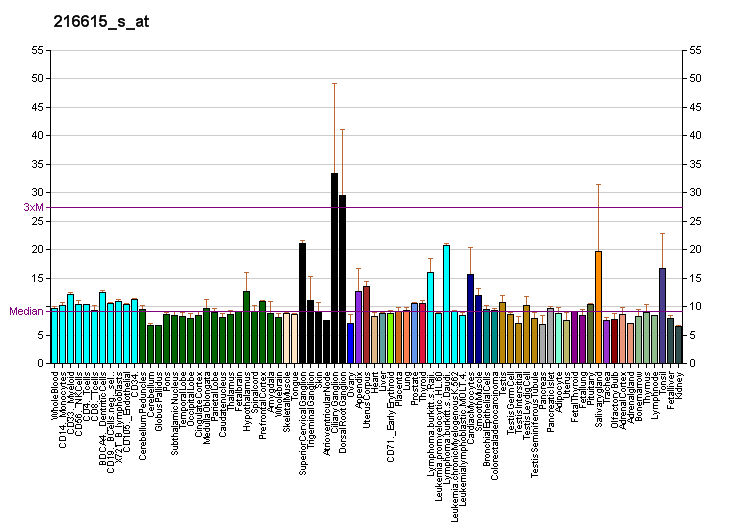
RNA expression pattern
Bgee	Human / Mouse (ortholog); Top expressed in: spinal ganglia; testicle; trigeminal ganglion; lymph node; islet of Langerhans; appendix; gingival epithelium; muscle layer of sigmoid colon; caudate nucleus; minor salivary glands / Top expressed in: lumbar spinal ganglion; Rostral migratory stream; facial motor nucleus; medial ganglionic eminence; right ventricle; embryo; carotid body; embryo; dentate gyrus of hippocampal formation granule cell; retinal pigment epithelium; More reference expression data
BioGPS	More reference expression data
Gene ontology
Molecular function	protein binding; ligand-gated ion channel activity; serotonin binding; extracellular ligand-gated ion channel activity; serotonin-gated cation-selective channel activity; ion channel activity; transmembrane signaling receptor activity
Cellular component	cytoplasm; integral component of membrane; postsynaptic membrane; membrane; plasma membrane; synapse; axon; cell junction; soma; serotonin-activated cation-selective channel complex; cleavage furrow; glutamatergic synapse; integral component of postsynaptic membrane; integral component of presynaptic membrane; integral component of plasma membrane; neuron projection
Biological process	response to cocaine; cellular response to growth factor stimulus; ion transport; response to ethanol; positive regulation of ion transmembrane transporter activity; signal transduction; ion transmembrane transport; serotonin receptor signaling pathway; chemical synaptic transmission; regulation of membrane potential; nervous system process
Sources:Amigo / QuickGO
Orthologs
Databases	NCBI: entry; OMA: entry
Species	Human	Mouse
Entrez	3359	15561
Ensembl	ENSG00000166736	ENSMUSG00000032269
UniProt	P46098	P23979
RefSeq (mRNA)	NM_000869; NM_001161772; NM_213621	NM_001099644; NM_013561
RefSeq (protein)	NP_000860; NP_001155244; NP_998786	NP_001093114; NP_038589
Location (UCSC)	Chr 11: 113.98 – 113.99 Mb	Chr 9: 48.81 – 48.82 Mb
PubMed search
- Wikidata
View/Edit Human	View/Edit Mouse

5-hydroxytryptamine receptor 3A is a protein that in humans is encoded by the HTR3A gene.

The product of this gene belongs to the ligand-gated ion channel receptor superfamily. This gene encodes subunit A of the type 3 receptor for 5-hydroxytryptamine (serotonin), a biogenic hormone that functions as a neurotransmitter, a hormone, and a mitogen. This receptor causes fast, depolarizing responses in neurons after activation. The A subunit is the only one that can be expressed alone and forms homomers with a very low single channel conductance of 0.6pS. When combined with the B subunit and expressed as a heteromer, the single channel conductance increases immensely. Alternatively spliced transcript variants encoding different isoforms have been identified.

== See also ==
- 5-HT3 receptor
