= SR-57227 =

Chemical compound

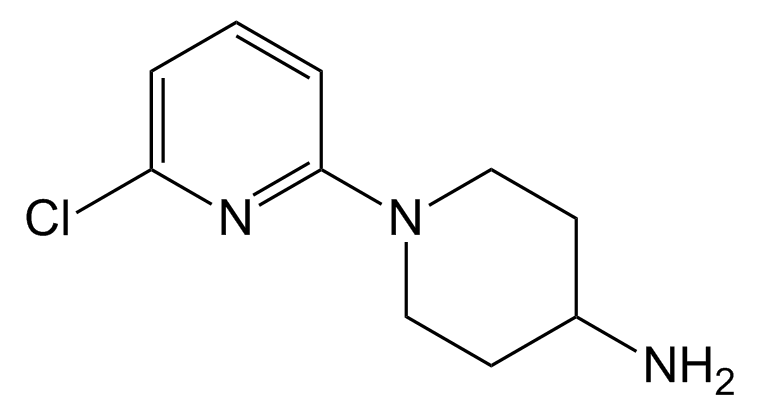

Identifiers
- IUPAC name: 1-(6-chloropyridin-2-yl)piperidin-4-amine
- CAS Number: 77145-61-0
- PubChem CID: 131747
- IUPHAR/BPS: 4316
- ChemSpider: 116402
- UNII: OW45B79UZD
- CompTox Dashboard (EPA): DTXSID8046953 DTXSID5045201, DTXSID8046953
- ECHA InfoCard: 100.163.915

Chemical and physical data
- Formula: C_{10}H_{14}ClN_{3}
- Molar mass: 211.69 g·mol^{−1}
- 3D model (JSmol): Interactive image
- SMILES: ClC1=CC=CC(N2CCC(N)CC2)=N1
- InChI: InChI=1S/C10H14ClN3/c11-9-2-1-3-10(13-9)14-6-4-8(12)5-7-14/h1-3,8H,4-7,12H2; Key:WPVVMKYQOMJPIN-UHFFFAOYSA-N

SR-57227 is a potent and selective agonist at the 5HT_{3} receptor, with high selectivity over other serotonin receptor subtypes and good blood–brain barrier penetration.
