= HTR3B =

Protein-coding gene in the species Homo sapiens

Identifiers
- Aliases: HTR3B, 5-HT3B, 5-hydroxytryptamine receptor 3B
- External IDs: OMIM: 604654; MGI: 1861899; GeneCards: HTR3B

Gene location (Human)
Chr.	Chromosome 11 (human)
Band	11q23.2	Start	113,904,796 bp
Band	11q23.2	End	113,949,079 bp

Gene location (Mouse)
Chr.	Chromosome 9 (mouse)
Band	9|9 A5.3	Start	48,846,308 bp
Band	9|9 A5.3	End	48,876,290 bp
RNA expression pattern
Bgee	Human / Mouse (ortholog); Top expressed in: prefrontal cortex; right frontal lobe; Brodmann area 9; anterior cingulate cortex; primary visual cortex; superior frontal gyrus; gonad; kidney; human kidney; amygdala / Top expressed in: lumbar spinal ganglion; female external genitalia; urethra; autonomic nervous system; sympathetic ganglion; cervical ganglion; glossopharyngeal ganglion; stellate ganglion; embryo; tunica adventitia of aorta; More reference expression data
BioGPS	n/a
Gene ontology
Molecular function	extracellular ligand-gated ion channel activity; ligand-gated ion channel activity; serotonin-gated cation-selective channel activity; ion channel activity; transmembrane signaling receptor activity
Cellular component	integral component of membrane; membrane; cell surface; plasma membrane; postsynaptic membrane; integral component of plasma membrane; serotonin-activated cation-selective channel complex; neuron projection; synapse
Biological process	ion transport; signal transduction; ion transmembrane transport; serotonin receptor signaling pathway; chemical synaptic transmission; regulation of membrane potential; nervous system process
Sources:Amigo / QuickGO
Orthologs
Databases	NCBI: entry; OMA: entry
Species	Human	Mouse
Entrez	9177	57014
Ensembl	ENSG00000149305	ENSMUSG00000008590
UniProt	O95264	Q9JHJ5
RefSeq (mRNA)	NM_006028; NM_001363563	NM_020274
RefSeq (protein)	NP_006019; NP_001350492	NP_064670
Location (UCSC)	Chr 11: 113.9 – 113.95 Mb	Chr 9: 48.85 – 48.88 Mb
PubMed search
- Wikidata
View/Edit Human	View/Edit Mouse

5-hydroxytryptamine (serotonin) receptor 3B, also known as HTR3B, is a human gene. The protein encoded by this gene is a subunit of the 5-HT3 receptor.
