= YM-31636 =

Names
- IUPAC name 2-(1H-imidazol-4-ylmethyl)-8H-indeno[1,2-d]thiazole

Identifiers
CAS Number	159081-22-8
3D model (JSmol)	Interactive image
ChemSpider	8083000
MeSH	C419869
PubChem CID	9907348
UNII	K9K8W6KEH2
CompTox Dashboard (EPA)	DTXSID60432686
- InChI: InChI=1S/C14H11N3S/c1-2-4-11-9(3-1)5-12-14(11)17-13(18-12)6-10-7-15-8-16-10/h1-4,7-8H,5-6H2,(H,15,16) Key: SWXJBBYBDXFMGG-UHFFFAOYSA-N; InChI=1/C14H11N3S/c1-2-4-11-9(3-1)5-12-14(11)17-13(18-12)6-10-7-15-8-16-10/h1-4,7-8H,5-6H2,(H,15,16) Key: SWXJBBYBDXFMGG-UHFFFAOYAP
- SMILES: n2c4c1ccccc1Cc4sc2Cc3c[nH]cn3

Properties
Chemical formula	C_{14}H_{11}N_{3}S
Molar mass	253.32 g mol^{−1}
- Except where otherwise noted, data are given for materials in their standard state (at 25 °C [77 °F], 100 kPa). Infobox references

YM-31636 is a potent and selective 5-HT_{3} agonist. Systemic administration of YM-31636 increased the number of fecal pellets in rats, and improves colonic motility. It also increases colonic secretions, but not to the point of inducing diarrhea. In addition, it did not reduce the visceral pain threshold, or increase the intensity of visceral pain. These properties indicate that it could be a useful treatment for constipation.
