= (+)-cis-2-Aminomethylcyclopropane carboxylic acid =

- Stereo, skeletal formula of (+)-cis-2-aminomethylcyclopropane carboxylic acid

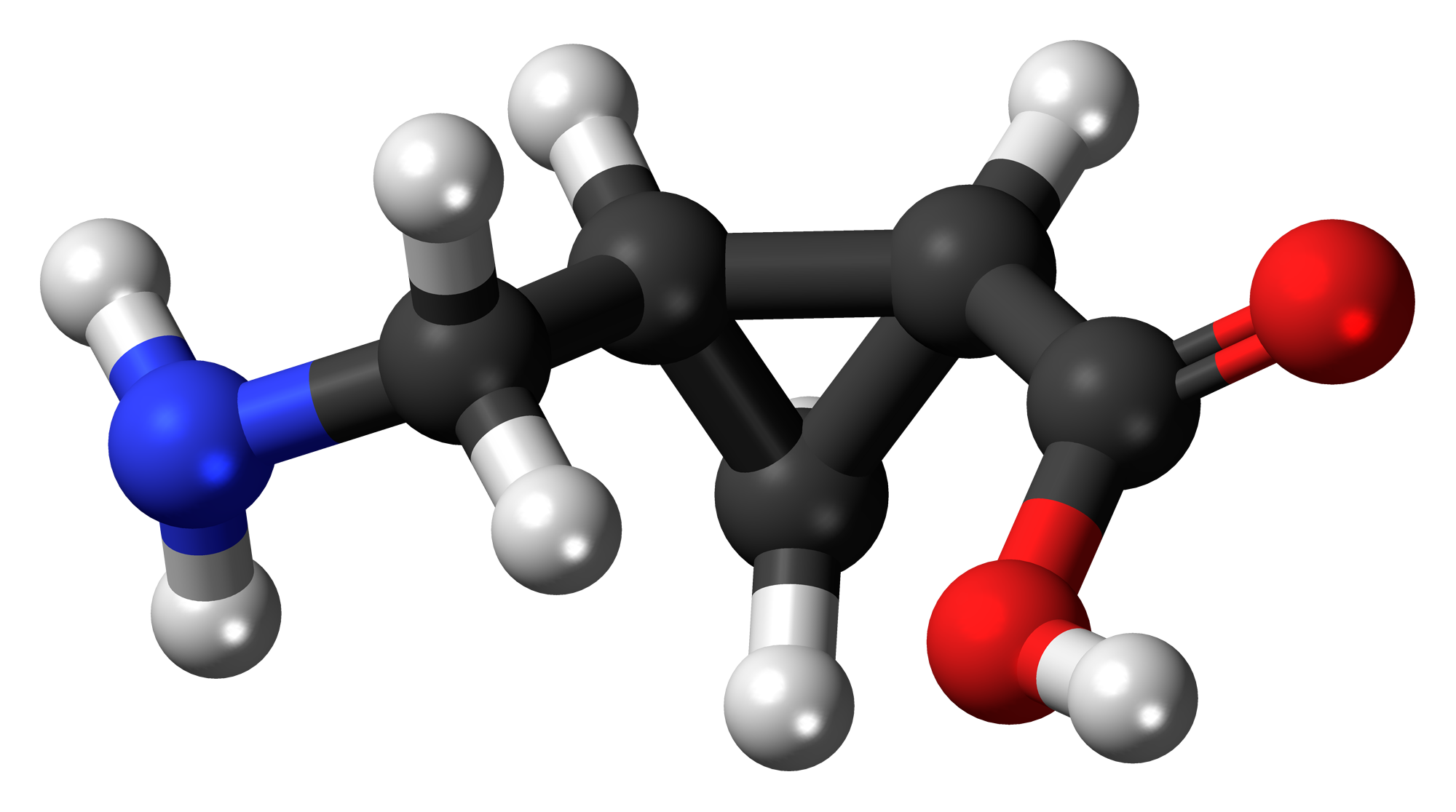
- C=black, H=white, O=red, N=blue

Names
- Preferred IUPAC name (1S,2R)-2-(Aminomethyl)cyclopropane-1-carboxylic acid

Identifiers
CAS Number	36489-13-1
3D model (JSmol)	Interactive image
ChEMBL	ChEMBL230115
ChemSpider	1236854
PubChem CID	1502041
- InChI: InChI=1S/C5H9NO2/c6-2-3-1-4(3)5(7)8/h3-4H,1-2,6H2,(H,7,8)/t3-,4-/m0/s1 Key: QUFMERRXRMSAPZ-IMJSIDKUSA-N
- SMILES: NC[C@@H]1C[C@@H]1C(O)=O

Properties
Chemical formula	C_{5}H_{9}NO_{2}
Molar mass	115.132 g·mol^{−1}
Density	1.275 g/mL
Boiling point	256.9 °C (494.4 °F; 530.0 K)
log P	−0.721
Acidity (pK_{a})	4.157
Basicity (pK_{b})	9.840
Isoelectric point	7.01

Related compounds
Related cycloalkanes	ACPD
- Except where otherwise noted, data are given for materials in their standard state (at 25 °C [77 °F], 100 kPa). verify (what is ?) Infobox references

(+)-cis-2-Aminomethylcyclopropane carboxylic acid ((+)-CAMP) is an agonist for the GABAA-rho receptor.
