= GABRB1 =

Protein-coding gene in the species Homo sapiens

Identifiers
- Aliases: GABRB1, gamma-aminobutyric acid type A receptor beta1 subunit, EIEE45, gamma-aminobutyric acid type A receptor subunit beta1, DEE45
- External IDs: OMIM: 137190; MGI: 95619; GeneCards: GABRB1

Gene location (Human)
Chr.	Chromosome 4 (human)
Band	4p12	Start	46,993,723 bp
Band	4p12	End	47,426,447 bp

Gene location (Mouse)
Chr.	Chromosome 5 (mouse)
Band	5 C3.2|5 38.18 cM	Start	71,815,456 bp
Band	5 C3.2|5 38.18 cM	End	72,306,380 bp
RNA expression pattern
Bgee	Human / Mouse (ortholog); Top expressed in: Brodmann area 23; middle temporal gyrus; entorhinal cortex; pars reticulata; dorsal motor nucleus of vagus nerve; parietal lobe; endothelial cell; postcentral gyrus; Region I of hippocampus proper; pars compacta / Top expressed in: CA3 field; nucleus of stria terminalis; subiculum; paraventricular nucleus of hypothalamus; substantia nigra; ventromedial nucleus; anterior amygdaloid area; medial dorsal nucleus; lateral hypothalamus; Region I of hippocampus proper; More reference expression data
BioGPS	n/a
Gene ontology
Molecular function	anion channel activity; ion channel activity; chloride channel activity; extracellular ligand-gated ion channel activity; ligand-gated ion channel activity; GABA-gated chloride ion channel activity; GABA-A receptor activity; transmembrane signaling receptor activity; GABA receptor binding; transmitter-gated ion channel activity involved in regulation of postsynaptic membrane potential
Cellular component	cytoplasm; integral component of membrane; postsynaptic membrane; nuclear envelope; membrane; receptor complex; synapse; integral component of plasma membrane; chloride channel complex; cell junction; dendrite; nucleus; plasma membrane; GABA-A receptor complex; neuron projection; GABA-ergic synapse
Biological process	cellular response to histamine; response to progesterone; ion transport; central nervous system neuron development; ovarian cycle; chloride transport; response to toxic substance; signal transduction; chloride transmembrane transport; gamma-aminobutyric acid signaling pathway; ion transmembrane transport; chemical synaptic transmission; regulation of membrane potential; nervous system process; regulation of postsynaptic membrane potential
Sources:Amigo / QuickGO
Orthologs
Databases	NCBI: entry; OMA: entry
Species	Human	Mouse
Entrez	2560	14400
Ensembl	ENSG00000163288	ENSMUSG00000029212
UniProt	P18505	P50571
RefSeq (mRNA)	NM_000812	NM_008069; NM_001370968
RefSeq (protein)	NP_000803	NP_032095; NP_001357897
Location (UCSC)	Chr 4: 46.99 – 47.43 Mb	Chr 5: 71.82 – 72.31 Mb
PubMed search
- Wikidata
View/Edit Human	View/Edit Mouse

Gamma-aminobutyric acid receptor subunit beta-1 is a protein that in humans is encoded by the GABRB1 gene.

== Function ==
The gamma-aminobutyric acid A receptor (GABA_{A} receptor) is a multisubunit chloride channel that mediates the fastest inhibitory synaptic transmission in the central nervous system. This gene encodes GABA A receptor, beta 1 subunit. It is mapped to chromosome 4p12 in a cluster of genes encoding alpha 4, alpha 2 and gamma 1 subunits of the GABA_{A} receptor. Alteration of this gene is implicated in the pathogenetics of schizophrenia.

== Clinical significance ==
Mice bearing mutant copies of this gene have been shown to be vulnerable to binge drinking of alcohol.

== See also ==
- GABAA receptor
