= (1,2,5,6-Tetrahydropyridin-4-yl)methylphosphinic acid =

Names
- Preferred IUPAC name Methyl(1,2,3,6-tetrahydropyridin-4-yl)phosphinic acid
- Other names TPMPA

Identifiers
CAS Number	182485-36-5
3D model (JSmol)	Interactive image; Interactive image
ChEMBL	ChEMBL397209
ChemSpider	5319
IUPHAR/BPS	4328
PubChem CID	5521
UNII	TR7I0800L2
CompTox Dashboard (EPA)	DTXSID801017153
- InChI: InChI=1S/C6H12NO2P/c1-10(8,9)6-2-4-7-5-3-6/h2,7H,3-5H2,1H3,(H,8,9) Key: MFUKVPOVVKKLRQ-UHFFFAOYSA-N; InChI=1/C6H12NO2P/c1-10(8,9)6-2-4-7-5-3-6/h2,7H,3-5H2,1H3,(H,8,9) Key: MFUKVPOVVKKLRQ-UHFFFAOYAY
- SMILES: CP(=O)(C1=CCNCC1)O; O=P([O-])(/C1=C/C[NH2+]CC1)C

Properties
Chemical formula	C_{6}H_{12}NO_{2}P
Molar mass	161.141 g·mol^{−1}
- Except where otherwise noted, data are given for materials in their standard state (at 25 °C [77 °F], 100 kPa). verify (what is ?) Infobox references

(1,2,5,6-Tetrahydropyridin-4-yl)methylphosphinic acid (TPMPA) is a GABA antagonist selective for the GABA_{A}-ρ (previously known as GABA_{C}) subtype.
