= 4-Iodopropofol =

Chemical compound

Identifiers
- IUPAC name: 2,6-diisopropyl-4-iodophenol
- CAS Number: 169255-48-5
- PubChem CID: 9882905
- ChemSpider: 8058580
- UNII: 6WD5JT8TB8
- ChEMBL: ChEMBL53267
- CompTox Dashboard (EPA): DTXSID10432353
- ECHA InfoCard: 100.220.512

Chemical and physical data
- Formula: C_{12}H_{17}IO
- Molar mass: 304.171 g·mol^{−1}
- 3D model (JSmol): Interactive image
- SMILES: Oc1c(C(C)C)cc(I)cc1C(C)C
- InChI: InChI=1S/C12H17IO/c1-7(2)10-5-9(13)6-11(8(3)4)12(10)14/h5-8,14H,1-4H3; Key:JMJHJCFWTNRPEI-UHFFFAOYSA-N

4-Iodopropofol is a drug derived from the commonly used sedative anaesthetic agent, propofol. 4-Iodopropofol has similar effects to propofol on isolated receptors, acting primarily as a GABA_{A} positive modulator and sodium channel blocker, but when given to animals it has only anxiolytic and anticonvulsant effects, lacking the strong sedative-hypnotic profile of propofol.
