= HTR3E =

Protein-coding gene in the species Homo sapiens

Identifiers
- Aliases: HTR3E, 5-HT3-E, 5-HT3E, 5-HT3c1, 5-hydroxytryptamine receptor 3E
- External IDs: OMIM: 610123; GeneCards: HTR3E

Gene location (Human)
| Chr. | Chromosome 3 (human) |
| Band | 3q27.1 | Start | 184,097,064 bp |
| Band | 3q27.1 | End | 184,106,995 bp |
RNA expression pattern
| Bgee | Human / Mouse (ortholog); Top expressed in: mucosa of transverse colon; duodenum; placenta; rectum; right lung; prefrontal cortex; muscle of thigh; lymph node; appendix; white blood cell / n/a; More reference expression data |
| BioGPS | n/a |
Gene ontology
| Molecular function | protein binding; extracellular ligand-gated ion channel activity; serotonin-gated cation-selective channel activity; ion channel activity; transmembrane signaling receptor activity |
| Cellular component | integral component of membrane; plasma membrane; membrane; integral component of plasma membrane; neuron projection; synapse |
| Biological process | ion transport; signal transduction; ion transmembrane transport; serotonin receptor signaling pathway; chemical synaptic transmission; regulation of membrane potential; nervous system process |
Sources:Amigo / QuickGO
Orthologs
| Databases | NCBI: entry; OMA: entry |
| Species | Human | Mouse |
| Entrez | 285242 | n/a |
| Ensembl | ENSG00000186038 | n/a |
| UniProt | A5X5Y0 | n/a |
| RefSeq (mRNA) | NM_198314; NM_001256613; NM_001256614; NM_182589; NM_198313 | n/a |
| RefSeq (protein) | NP_001243542; NP_001243543; NP_872395; NP_938055; NP_938056 | n/a |
| Location (UCSC) | Chr 3: 184.1 – 184.11 Mb | n/a |
| PubMed search | | n/a |
- Wikidata
| View/Edit Human |

5-hydroxytryptamine receptor 3E is a protein that in humans is encoded by the HTR3E gene. The protein encoded by this gene is a subunit of the 5-HT3 receptor.
