= Chlorophenylbiguanide =

Chemical compound

Identifiers
- IUPAC name: 2-(3-Chlorophenyl)-1-(diaminomethylidene)guanidine
- CAS Number: 48144-44-1
- PubChem CID: 1354
- IUPHAR/BPS: 2287
- ChemSpider: 27570
- UNII: 910A4X901V
- ChEMBL: ChEMBL42752
- CompTox Dashboard (EPA): DTXSID70197436

Chemical and physical data
- Formula: C_{8}H_{12}ClN_{5}
- Molar mass: 213.67 g·mol^{−1}
- 3D model (JSmol): Interactive image
- SMILES: c1ccc(Cl)cc1NC(=N)NC(=N)N
- InChI: InChI=1S/C8H10ClN5/c9-5-3-1-2-4-6(5)13-8(12)14-7(10)11/h1-4H,(H6,10,11,12,13,14); Key:MKWFJPZMYHPQIA-UHFFFAOYSA-N

meta-Chlorophenylbiguanide (1-(3-chlorophenylbiguanide, m-CPBG) is an allosteric agonist and modulator of the 5-HT_{3} receptor and an antagonist of the α_{2A}-adrenergic receptor. It has anxiogenic, emetic and hypothermic effects in animal studies.

== See also ==
- meta-Chlorophenylpiperazine (mCPP)
- Bufotenidine (5-HTQ)
- Phenylbiguanide
