= HTR3D =

Protein-coding gene in the species Homo sapiens

Identifiers
- Aliases: HTR3D, 5HT3D, 5-hydroxytryptamine receptor 3D
- External IDs: OMIM: 610122; GeneCards: HTR3D

Gene location (Human)
Chr.	Chromosome 3 (human)
Band	3q27.1	Start	184,031,544 bp
Band	3q27.1	End	184,039,369 bp
RNA expression pattern
Bgee	Human / Mouse (ortholog); Top expressed in: gonad; olfactory zone of nasal mucosa / n/a; More reference expression data
BioGPS	n/a
Gene ontology
Molecular function	protein binding; extracellular ligand-gated ion channel activity; serotonin-gated cation-selective channel activity; ion channel activity; transmembrane signaling receptor activity
Cellular component	integral component of membrane; plasma membrane; membrane; integral component of plasma membrane; neuron projection; synapse
Biological process	ion transport; signal transduction; ion transmembrane transport; serotonin receptor signaling pathway; chemical synaptic transmission; regulation of membrane potential; nervous system process
Sources:Amigo / QuickGO
Orthologs
Databases	NCBI: entry; OMA: entry
Species	Human	Mouse
Entrez	200909	n/a
Ensembl	ENSG00000186090	n/a
UniProt	Q70Z44	n/a
RefSeq (mRNA)	NM_182537; NM_001145143; NM_001163646	n/a
RefSeq (protein)	NP_001138615; NP_001157118; NP_872343	n/a
Location (UCSC)	Chr 3: 184.03 – 184.04 Mb	n/a
PubMed search		n/a
- Wikidata
View/Edit Human

5-hydroxytryptamine receptor 3D is a protein that in humans is encoded by the HTR3D gene. The protein encoded by this gene is a subunit of the 5-HT3 receptor.
