= GABRP =

Protein-coding gene in the species Homo sapiens

Identifiers
- Aliases: GABRP, gamma-aminobutyric acid type A receptor pi subunit, gamma-aminobutyric acid type A receptor subunit pi
- External IDs: OMIM: 602729; MGI: 2387597; GeneCards: GABRP

Gene location (Human)
Chr.	Chromosome 5 (human)
Band	5q35.1	Start	170,763,350 bp
Band	5q35.1	End	170,814,047 bp

Gene location (Mouse)
Chr.	Chromosome 11 (mouse)
Band	11|11 A4	Start	33,500,781 bp
Band	11|11 A4	End	33,528,959 bp
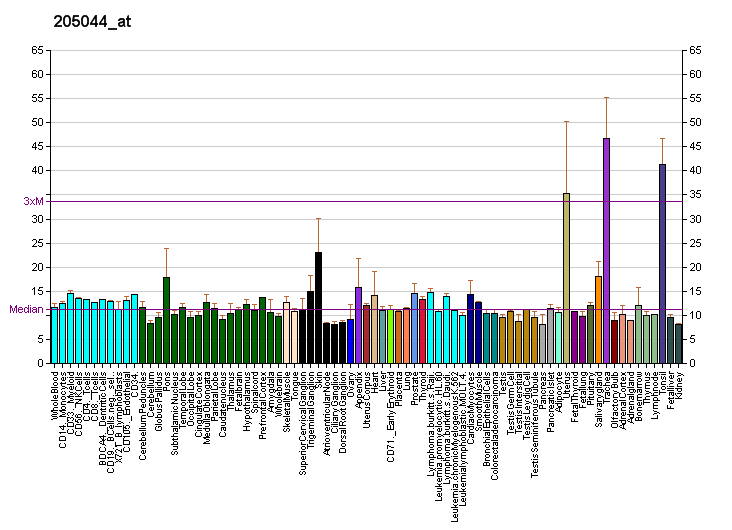
RNA expression pattern
Bgee	Human / Mouse (ortholog); Top expressed in: nasal epithelium; epithelium of nasopharynx; palpebral conjunctiva; olfactory zone of nasal mucosa; endometrium; epithelium of lactiferous gland; lactiferous duct; mucosa of paranasal sinus; amniotic fluid; epithelium of bronchus / Top expressed in: trachea; right lung lobe; olfactory epithelium; genital tubercle; abdominal wall; gastrula; secondary oocyte; seminal vesicula; lip; skin of abdomen; More reference expression data
BioGPS	More reference expression data
Gene ontology
Molecular function	extracellular ligand-gated ion channel activity; chloride channel activity; GABA-A receptor activity; ion channel activity; transmembrane signaling receptor activity
Cellular component	integral component of membrane; cell junction; postsynaptic membrane; plasma membrane; synapse; membrane; chloride channel complex; GABA-A receptor complex; integral component of plasma membrane; neuron projection
Biological process	ion transmembrane transport; chloride transport; ion transport; signal transduction; chloride transmembrane transport; chemical synaptic transmission; regulation of membrane potential; nervous system process
Sources:Amigo / QuickGO
Orthologs
Databases	NCBI: entry; OMA: entry
Species	Human	Mouse
Entrez	2568	216643
Ensembl	ENSG00000094755	ENSMUSG00000020159
UniProt	O00591	Q8QZW7
RefSeq (mRNA)	NM_001291985; NM_014211	NM_146017
RefSeq (protein)	NP_001278914; NP_055026	NP_666129
Location (UCSC)	Chr 5: 170.76 – 170.81 Mb	Chr 11: 33.5 – 33.53 Mb
PubMed search
- Wikidata
View/Edit Human	View/Edit Mouse

Gamma-aminobutyric acid receptor subunit pi is a protein that in humans is encoded by the GABRP gene.

The gamma-aminobutyric acid (GABA) A receptor is a multisubunit chloride channel that mediates the fastest inhibitory synaptic transmission in the central nervous system. The subunit encoded by this gene is expressed in several non-neuronal tissues including the uterus and ovaries. This subunit can assemble with known GABA A receptor subunits, and the presence of this subunit alters the sensitivity of recombinant receptors to modulatory agents such as pregnanolone.

== See also ==
- GABAA receptor
