= GABRR1 =

Protein-coding gene in the species Homo sapiens

Identifiers
- Aliases: GABRR1, gamma-aminobutyric acid type A receptor rho1 subunit, gamma-aminobutyric acid type A receptor subunit rho1
- External IDs: OMIM: 137161; MGI: 95625; GeneCards: GABRR1

Gene location (Human)
Chr.	Chromosome 6 (human)
Band	6q15	Start	89,177,504 bp
Band	6q15	End	89,231,278 bp

Gene location (Mouse)
Chr.	Chromosome 4 (mouse)
Band	4 A5|4 14.68 cM	Start	33,132,521 bp
Band	4 A5|4 14.68 cM	End	33,163,588 bp
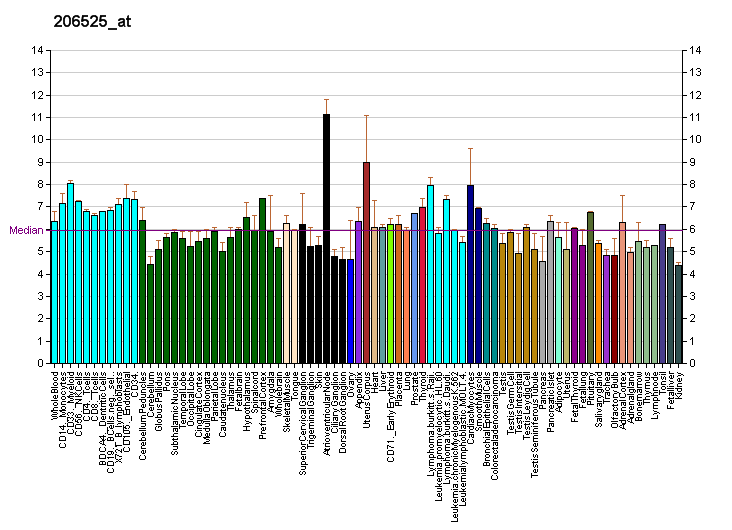
RNA expression pattern
Bgee	Human / Mouse (ortholog); Top expressed in: testicle; gonad; Descending thoracic aorta; ascending aorta; pancreatic ductal cell; tibialis anterior muscle; deltoid muscle; tibial arteries; left coronary artery; right coronary artery / Top expressed in: neural layer of retina; embryo; embryo; muscle of thigh; epithelium of lens; More reference expression data
BioGPS	More reference expression data
Gene ontology
Molecular function	chloride channel activity; extracellular ligand-gated ion channel activity; GABA-A receptor activity; ion channel activity; transmembrane signaling receptor activity; ligand-gated ion channel activity involved in regulation of presynaptic membrane potential; transmitter-gated ion channel activity involved in regulation of postsynaptic membrane potential
Cellular component	integral component of membrane; GABA-A receptor complex; postsynaptic membrane; membrane; plasma membrane; synapse; integral component of plasma membrane; chloride channel complex; cell junction; neuron projection; glutamatergic synapse; GABA-ergic synapse
Biological process	gamma-aminobutyric acid signaling pathway; chloride transmembrane transport; ion transport; chloride transport; chemical synaptic transmission; ion transmembrane transport; signal transduction; regulation of membrane potential; nervous system process; regulation of postsynaptic membrane potential; regulation of presynaptic membrane potential
Sources:Amigo / QuickGO
Orthologs
Databases	NCBI: entry; OMA: entry
Species	Human	Mouse
Entrez	2569	14408
Ensembl	ENSG00000146276	ENSMUSG00000028280
UniProt	P24046	P56475
RefSeq (mRNA)	NM_001256703; NM_001256704; NM_001267582; NM_002042	NM_008075
RefSeq (protein)	NP_001243632; NP_001243633; NP_001254511; NP_002033	NP_032101
Location (UCSC)	Chr 6: 89.18 – 89.23 Mb	Chr 4: 33.13 – 33.16 Mb
PubMed search
- Wikidata
View/Edit Human	View/Edit Mouse

Gamma-aminobutyric acid receptor subunit rho-1 is a protein that in humans is encoded by the GABRR1 gene.

GABA is the major inhibitory neurotransmitter in the mammalian brain where it acts at GABA receptors, which are ligand-gated chloride channels. GABRR1 is a member of the rho subunit family.

== See also ==
- GABA_{A}-ρ receptor
