= Azasetron =

Chemical compound

Clinical data
- Trade names: Serotone
- AHFS/Drugs.com: International Drug Names
- Routes of administration: Oral, intravenous
- ATC code: none

Pharmacokinetic data
- Bioavailability: 90%
- Excretion: 60-70%

Identifiers
- IUPAC name: N-(1-azabicyclo[2.2.2]octan-8-yl)-6-chloro-4-methyl-3-oxo-1,4-benzoxazine-8-carboxamide
- CAS Number: 123040-69-7
- PubChem CID: 2264
- IUPHAR/BPS: 2285
- ChemSpider: 2177
- UNII: 77HC7URR9Z
- KEGG: D07481
- ChEMBL: ChEMBL1598608
- CompTox Dashboard (EPA): DTXSID7045651

Chemical and physical data
- Formula: C_{17}H_{20}ClN_{3}O_{3}
- Molar mass: 349.82 g·mol^{−1}
- 3D model (JSmol): Interactive image
- SMILES: CN1C(=O)COc2c1cc(Cl)cc2C(=O)NC3CN4CCC3CC4
- InChI: InChI=1S/C17H20ClN3O3/c1-20-14-7-11(18)6-12(16(14)24-9-15(20)22)17(23)19-13-8-21-4-2-10(13)3-5-21/h6-7,10,13H,2-5,8-9H2,1H3,(H,19,23); Key:WUKZPHOXUVCQOR-UHFFFAOYSA-N

Azasetron is an antiemetic which acts as a 5-HT_{3} receptor antagonist, pK_{i} = 9.27 It is used in the management of nausea and vomiting induced by cancer chemotherapy (such as cisplatin chemotherapy). Azasetron hydrochloride is given in a usual dose of 10 mg once daily by mouth or intravenously. It is approved for marketing in Japan, and marketed exclusively by Torii Pharmaceutical Co., Ltd. under the trade names "Serotone I.V. Injection 10 mg" and "Serotone Tablets 10 mg". Pharmacokinetics data from S. Tsukagoshi.

Arazasetron besylate (SENS-401) is an investigational drug formulation containing exclusively the R-enantiomer of azasetron. The compound has been studied to prevent hearing loss related to sudden sensorineural hearing loss (SSNHL), acoustic trauma, and cisplatin-induced ototoxicity.
