= HTR3C =

Protein-coding gene in the species Homo sapiens

Identifiers
- Aliases: HTR3C, 5-hydroxytryptamine receptor 3C
- External IDs: OMIM: 610121; GeneCards: HTR3C

Gene location (Human)
Chr.	Chromosome 3 (human)
Band	3q27.1	Start	184,053,047 bp
Band	3q27.1	End	184,060,673 bp
RNA expression pattern
Bgee	Human / Mouse (ortholog); Top expressed in: testicle; right lung; mucosa of transverse colon; upper lobe of left lung; duodenum; right lobe of thyroid gland; left lobe of thyroid gland; gallbladder; myometrium; skin of abdomen / n/a; More reference expression data
BioGPS	n/a
Gene ontology
Molecular function	protein binding; extracellular ligand-gated ion channel activity; serotonin-gated cation-selective channel activity; ion channel activity; transmembrane signaling receptor activity
Cellular component	integral component of membrane; plasma membrane; membrane; integral component of plasma membrane; neuron projection; synapse
Biological process	ion transport; signal transduction; ion transmembrane transport; serotonin receptor signaling pathway; chemical synaptic transmission; regulation of membrane potential; nervous system process
Sources:Amigo / QuickGO
Orthologs
Databases	NCBI: entry; OMA: entry
Species	Human	Mouse
Entrez	170572	n/a
Ensembl	ENSG00000178084	n/a
UniProt	Q8WXA8	n/a
RefSeq (mRNA)	NM_130770	n/a
RefSeq (protein)	NP_570126	n/a
Location (UCSC)	Chr 3: 184.05 – 184.06 Mb	n/a
PubMed search		n/a
- Wikidata
View/Edit Human

5-hydroxytryptamine receptor 3C is a protein that in humans is encoded by the HTR3C gene. The protein encoded by this gene is a subunit of the 5-HT3 receptor.
