= GABRR2 =

Protein-coding gene in the species Homo sapiens

Identifiers
- Aliases: GABRR2, gamma-aminobutyric acid type A receptor rho2 subunit, gamma-aminobutyric acid type A receptor subunit rho2
- External IDs: OMIM: 137162; MGI: 95626; GeneCards: GABRR2

Gene location (Human)
Chr.	Chromosome 6 (human)
Band	6q15	Start	89,254,464 bp
Band	6q15	End	89,315,299 bp

Gene location (Mouse)
Chr.	Chromosome 4 (mouse)
Band	4 A5|4 14.64 cM	Start	33,062,999 bp
Band	4 A5|4 14.64 cM	End	33,095,865 bp
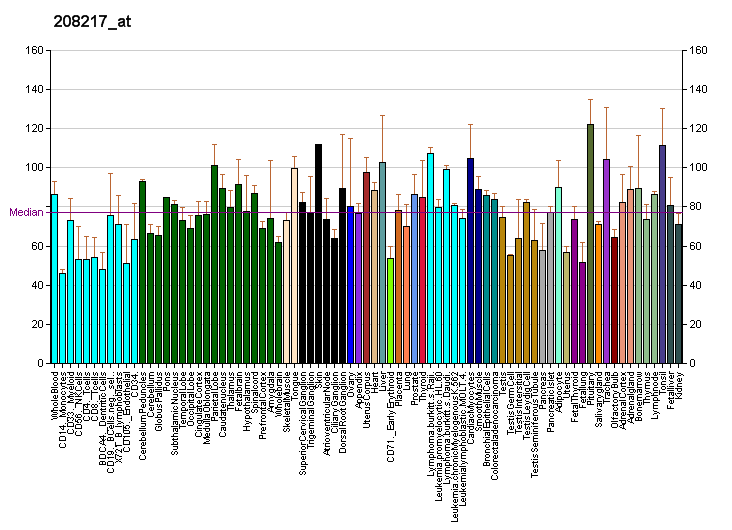
RNA expression pattern
Bgee	Human / Mouse (ortholog); Top expressed in: vena cava; gonad; germ cell; male germ cell; skeletal muscle tissue; deltoid muscle; sperm; tibialis anterior muscle; spleen; smooth muscle tissue / Top expressed in: neural layer of retina; embryo; embryo; muscle of thigh; blood; right kidney; superior colliculus; epithelium of lens; cerebellar cortex; medial head of gastrocnemius muscle; More reference expression data
BioGPS	More reference expression data
Gene ontology
Molecular function	chloride channel activity; extracellular ligand-gated ion channel activity; GABA-A receptor activity; ion channel activity; transmembrane signaling receptor activity; protein domain specific binding; transmitter-gated ion channel activity involved in regulation of postsynaptic membrane potential
Cellular component	integral component of membrane; GABA-A receptor complex; postsynaptic membrane; membrane; plasma membrane; synapse; integral component of plasma membrane; chloride channel complex; cell junction; neuron projection; GABA-ergic synapse
Biological process	gamma-aminobutyric acid signaling pathway; chloride transmembrane transport; ion transport; chloride transport; signal transduction; visual perception; chemical synaptic transmission; ion transmembrane transport; regulation of membrane potential; nervous system process; regulation of postsynaptic membrane potential
Sources:Amigo / QuickGO
Orthologs
Databases	NCBI: entry; OMA: entry
Species	Human	Mouse
Entrez	2570	14409
Ensembl	ENSG00000111886	ENSMUSG00000023267
UniProt	P28476	P56476
RefSeq (mRNA)	NM_002043	NM_008076
RefSeq (protein)	NP_002034	NP_032102
Location (UCSC)	Chr 6: 89.25 – 89.32 Mb	Chr 4: 33.06 – 33.1 Mb
PubMed search
- Wikidata
View/Edit Human	View/Edit Mouse

Gamma-aminobutyric acid receptor subunit rho-2 is a protein that in humans is encoded by the GABRR2 gene.

GABA is the major inhibitory neurotransmitter in the mammalian brain where it acts at GABA receptors, which are ligand-gated chloride channels. GABRR2 is a member of the rho subunit family.

== See also ==
- GABA_{A}-ρ receptor
