= GABAA-rho receptor =

Class of transport proteins

gamma-aminobutyric acid (GABA) receptor, rho 1

Identifiers
- Symbol: GABRR1
- NCBI gene: 2569
- HGNC: 4090
- OMIM: 137161
- RefSeq: NM_002042
- UniProt: P24046

Other data
- Locus: Chr. 6 q14-q21
Search for
- Structures: Swiss-model
- Domains: InterPro

gamma-aminobutyric acid (GABA) receptor, rho 2

Identifiers
- Symbol: GABRR2
- NCBI gene: 2570
- HGNC: 4091
- OMIM: 137162
- RefSeq: NM_002043
- UniProt: P28476

Other data
- Locus: Chr. 6 q14-q21
Search for
- Structures: Swiss-model
- Domains: InterPro

gamma-aminobutyric acid (GABA) receptor, rho 3

Identifiers
- Symbol: GABRR3
- NCBI gene: 200959
- HGNC: 17969
- RefSeq: NM_001105580
- UniProt: Q9UIV9

Other data
- Locus: Chr. 3 q12.2
Search for
- Structures: Swiss-model
- Domains: InterPro

The GABA_{A}-rho receptor (previously known as the GABA_{C} receptor) is a subclass of GABA_{A} receptors composed entirely of rho (ρ) subunits. GABA_{A} receptors including those of the ρ-subclass are ligand-gated ion channels responsible for mediating the effects of gamma-amino butyric acid (GABA), the major inhibitory neurotransmitter in the brain. The GABA_{A}-ρ receptor, like other GABA_{A} receptors, is expressed in many areas of the brain, but in contrast to other GABA_{A} receptors, the GABA_{A}-ρ receptor has especially high expression in the retina.

== Nomenclature ==
A second type of ionotropic GABA receptor, insensitive to typical allosteric modulators of GABA_{A} receptor channels such as benzodiazepines and barbiturates, was designated GABA_{С} receptor. Native responses of the GABA_{C} receptor type occur in retinal bipolar or horizontal cells across vertebrate species.

GABA_{С} receptors are exclusively composed of ρ (rho) subunits that are related to GABA_{A} receptor subunits. Although the term "GABA_{С} receptor" is frequently used, GABA_{С} may be viewed as a variant within the GABA_{A} receptor family. Others have argued that the differences between GABA_{С} and GABA_{A} receptors are large enough to justify maintaining the distinction between these two subclasses of GABA receptors. However, since GABA_{С} receptors are closely related in sequence, structure, and function to GABA_{A} receptors and since other GABA_{A} receptors besides those containing ρ subunits appear to exhibit GABA_{С} pharmacology, the Nomenclature Committee of the IUPHAR has recommended that the GABA_{С} term no longer be used and these ρ receptors should be designated as the ρ subfamily of the GABA_{A} receptors (GABA_{A}-ρ).

== Function ==
In addition to containing a GABA binding site, the GABA_{A}-ρ receptor complex conducts chloride ions across neuronal membranes. Binding of GABA to the receptor results in opening of this channel. When the reversal potential of chloride is less than the membrane potential, chloride ions flow down their electrochemical gradient into the cell. This influx of chloride ions lowers the membrane potential of the neuron, thus hyperpolarizing it, making it more difficult for these cells to conduct electrical impulses in the form of an action potential. Following stimulation by GABA, the chloride current produced by GABA_{A}-ρ receptors is slow to initiate but sustained in duration. In contrast, the GABA_{A} receptor current has a rapid onset and short duration. GABA is about 10 times more potent at GABA_{A}-ρ than it is at most GABA_{A} receptors.

== Structure ==
Like other ligand-gated ion channels, the GABA_{A}-ρ chloride channel is formed by oligomerization of five subunits arranged about a fivefold symmetry axis to form a central ion conducting pore. To date, three GABA_{A}-ρ receptor subunits have been identified in humans:

- ρ1 (GABRR1)
- ρ2 (GABRR2)
- ρ3 (GABRR3)

The above three subunits coassemble either to form functional homo-pentamers (ρ1_{5}, ρ2_{5}, ρ3_{5}) or hetero-pentamers (ρ1_{m}ρ2_{n}, ρ2_{m}ρ3_{n} where m + n = 5).

There is also evidence that ρ1 subunits can form hetero-pentameric complexes with GABA_{A} receptor γ2 subunits.

== Pharmacology ==
There are several pharmacological differences that distinguish GABA_{A}-ρ from GABA_{A} and GABA_{B} receptors. For example, GABA_{A}-ρ receptors are:

- selectively activated by (+)-CAMP [(+)-cis-2-aminomethylcyclopropane-carboxylic acid] and blocked by TPMPA [(1,2,5,6-tetrahydropyridin-4-yl)methylphosphinic acid];
- not sensitive to the GABA_{B} agonist baclofen nor the GABA_{A} receptor antagonist bicuculline;
- not modulated by many GABA_{A} receptor modulators such as barbiturates and benzodiazepines, but are modulated selectively by certain neuroactive steroids.

== Selective ligands ==
=== Agonists ===
- CACA
- CAMP
- GABOB
- Muscimol

=== Antagonists ===
Mixed GABA_{A}-ρ / GABA_{B} antagonists

- ZAPA ((Z)-3-[(Aminoiminomethyl)thio]prop-2-enoic acid)
- SKF-97541 (3-Aminopropyl(methyl)phosphinic acid)
- CGP-36742 (3-aminopropyl-n-butyl-phosphinic acid)

Selective GABA_{A}-ρ antagonists

- TPMPA
- (±)-cis-(3-Aminocyclopentyl)butylphosphinic acid
- (S)-(4-Aminocyclopent-1-enyl)butylphosphinic acid
- N_{2}O

== Genetics ==
In humans, GABA_{A}-ρ receptor subunits ρ1 and ρ2 are encoded by the GABRR1 and GABRR2 genes which are found on chromosome 6 whereas the GABRR3 gene for ρ3 is found on chromosome 3. Mutations in the ρ1 or ρ2 genes may be responsible for some cases of autosomal recessive retinitis pigmentosa.
