= Phenylbiguanide =

Chemical compound

Legal status
- Legal status: UN: Unscheduled

Identifiers
- IUPAC name: 1-Phenylbiguanide
- CAS Number: 102-02-3
- PubChem CID: 4780
- ChemSpider: 4616
- UNII: W8PKA3T2I3
- ChEBI: CHEBI:75377
- ChEMBL: ChEMBL13791
- CompTox Dashboard (EPA): DTXSID90144508
- ECHA InfoCard: 100.002.726

Chemical and physical data
- Formula: C_{8}H_{11}N_{5}
- Molar mass: 177.211 g·mol^{−1}
- 3D model (JSmol): Interactive image
- Melting point: 135–142 °C (275–288 °F)
- SMILES: c1ccc(cc1)NC(=N)NC(=N)N
- InChI: InChI=1S/C8H11N5/c9-7(10)13-8(11)12-6-4-2-1-3-5-6/h1-5H,(H6,9,10,11,12,13); Key:CUQCMXFWIMOWRP-UHFFFAOYSA-N

Phenylbiguanide (PBG) is a 5-HT3 agonist used to study the role of 5-HT3 receptors in the central nervous system. It has been found to trigger dopamine release in the nucleus accumbens of rats.

== Derivatives ==
- Phenylbiguanide is used to make amanozine and benfosformin.

== See also ==
- Chlorophenylbiguanide
