= RS-56812 =

Chemical compound

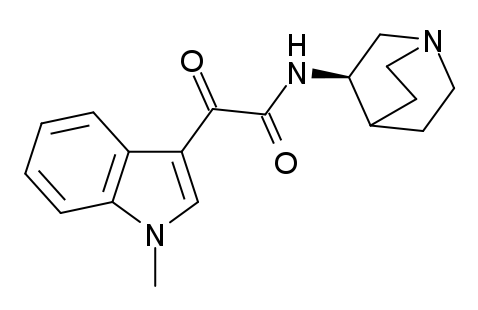

Identifiers
- IUPAC name: N-[(3R)-1-azabicyclo[2.2.2]oct-3-yl]-2-(1-methyl-1H-indol-3-yl)-2-oxoacetamide
- CAS Number: 143137-35-3
- PubChem CID: 6604789
- UNII: X639VH5LHY
- CompTox Dashboard (EPA): DTXSID80398179

Chemical and physical data
- Formula: C_{18}H_{21}N_{3}O_{2}
- Molar mass: 311.385 g·mol^{−1}
- 3D model (JSmol): Interactive image
- SMILES: c14ccccc4n(C)cc1C(=O)C(=O)NC2CN3CCC2CC3

RS-56812 is a potent and selective partial agonist at the 5HT_{3} receptor. It has been shown to improve performance on animal tests of memory. Its use in humans is not well documented.
