= (Z)-4-Amino-2-butenoic acid =

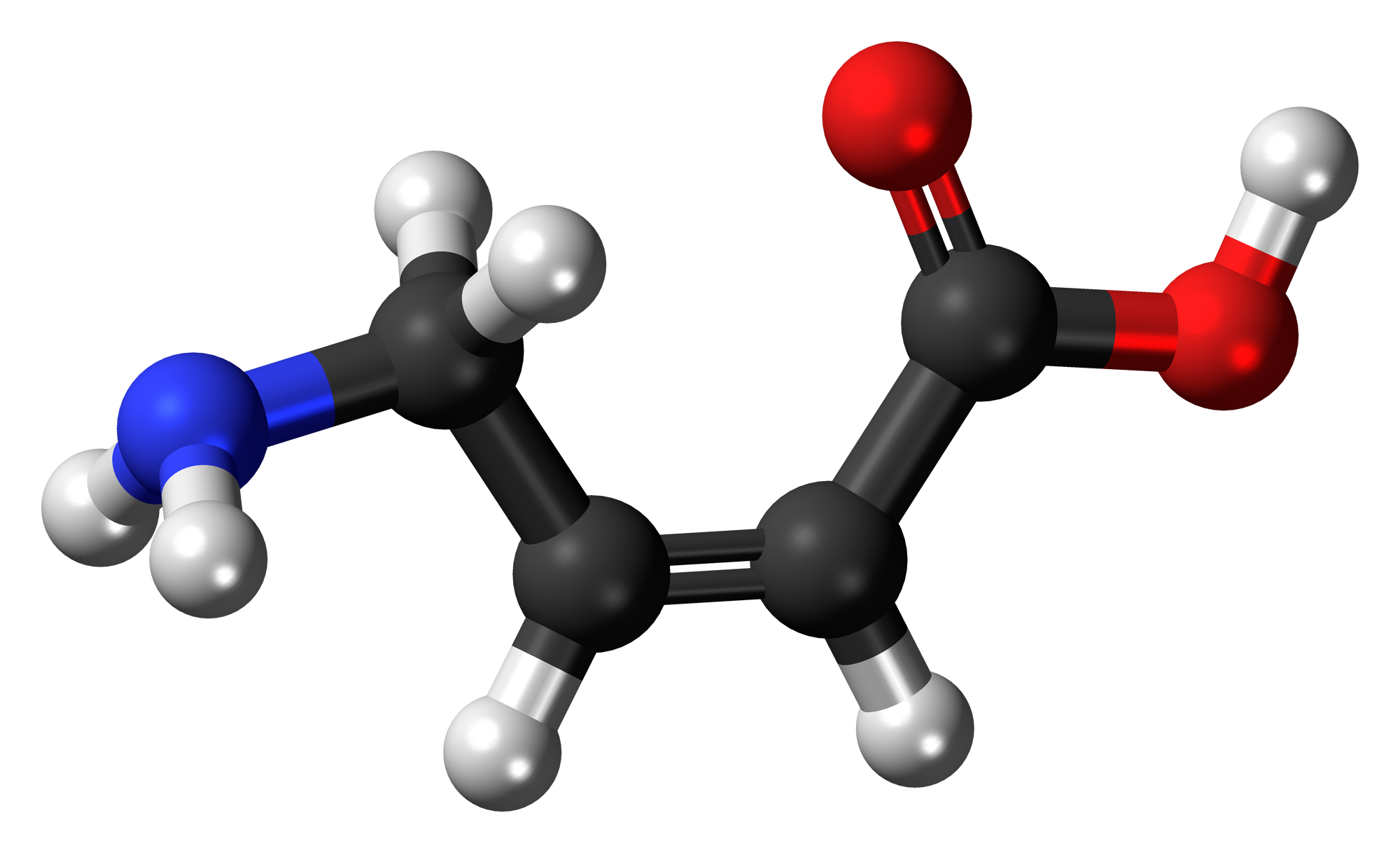
- C=black, H=white, O=red, N=blue

Names
- Preferred IUPAC name (2Z)-4-Aminobut-2-enoic acid
- Other names (Z)-4-Amino-2-butenoic acid cis-4-Aminocrotonic acid 4-Amino-cis-2-butenoic acid

Identifiers
CAS Number	55199-25-2
3D model (JSmol)	Interactive image; Interactive image
ChEMBL	ChEMBL32307
ChemSpider	5036011
IUPHAR/BPS	4148
PubChem CID	6603697
UNII	2B75NX3MA8
CompTox Dashboard (EPA)	DTXSID101017433
- InChI: InChI=1S/C4H7NO2/c5-3-1-2-4(6)7/h1-2H,3,5H2,(H,6,7)/b2-1- Key: FMKJUUQOYOHLTF-UPHRSURJSA-N; InChI=1/C4H7NO2/c5-3-1-2-4(6)7/h1-2H,3,5H2,(H,6,7)/b2-1- Key: FMKJUUQOYOHLTF-UPHRSURJBR
- SMILES: C(\C=C/C(=O)O)N; O=C(O)\C=C/CN

Properties
Chemical formula	C_{4}H_{7}NO_{2}
Molar mass	101.105 g·mol^{−1}
Solubility in water	124 mg/mL
- Except where otherwise noted, data are given for materials in their standard state (at 25 °C [77 °F], 100 kPa). verify (what is ?) Infobox references

(Z)-4-Amino-2-butenoic acid (cis-4-aminocrotonic acid) is a GABA receptor partial agonist selective for the GABA_{A}-ρ (previously known as GABA_{C}) subtype.
