= Zinc-activated ion channel =

Protein-coding gene in the species Homo sapiens

ZACN

Identifiers
- Aliases: ZACN, L2, LGICZ, LGICZ1, ZAC, ZAC1, Zinc-activated ion channel, zinc activated ion channel
- External IDs: OMIM: 610935; GeneCards: ZACN

Gene location (Human)
Chr.	Chromosome 17 (human)
Band	17q25.1	Start	76,071,961 bp
Band	17q25.1	End	76,083,666 bp
RNA expression pattern
Bgee	Human / Mouse (ortholog); Top expressed in: right hemisphere of cerebellum; right frontal lobe; Brodmann area 9; anterior cingulate cortex; anterior pituitary; mucosa of transverse colon; prefrontal cortex; hypothalamus; apex of heart; amygdala / n/a; More reference expression data
BioGPS	n/a
Gene ontology
Molecular function	extracellular ligand-gated ion channel activity; zinc ion binding; ligand-gated ion channel activity; ion channel activity; serotonin-gated cation-selective channel activity; transmembrane signaling receptor activity
Cellular component	integral component of membrane; plasma membrane; membrane; integral component of plasma membrane; neuron projection; synapse
Biological process	response to zinc ion; ion transport; signal transduction; ion transmembrane transport; serotonin receptor signaling pathway; chemical synaptic transmission; regulation of membrane potential; nervous system process
Sources:Amigo / QuickGO
Orthologs
Databases	NCBI: entry; OMA: entry
Species	Human	Mouse
Entrez	353174	n/a
Ensembl	ENSG00000186919	n/a
UniProt	Q401N2	n/a
RefSeq (mRNA)	NM_180990	n/a
RefSeq (protein)	NP_851321	n/a
Location (UCSC)	Chr 17: 76.07 – 76.08 Mb	n/a
PubMed search		n/a
- Wikidata
View/Edit Human

Zinc-activated ion channel (ZAC), is a human protein encoded by the ZACN gene. ZAC forms a cation-permeable ligand-gated ion channel of the "Cys-loop" superfamily. The ZAC gene is present in humans and dogs, but no ortholog is thought to exist in the rat or mouse genomes.

ZAC mRNA is expressed in prostate, thyroid, trachea, lung, brain (adult and fetal), spinal cord, skeletal muscle, heart, placenta, pancreas, liver, kidney and stomach. The endogenous ligand for ZAC is thought to be Zn^{2+}, although ZAC has also been found to activate spontaneously. The function of spontaneous ZAC activation is unknown.
