= GABRR3 =

Protein-coding gene in the species Homo sapiens

Identifiers
- Aliases: GABRR3, gamma-aminobutyric acid type A receptor rho3 subunit (gene/pseudogene), gamma-aminobutyric acid type A receptor subunit rho3 (gene/pseudogene), gamma-aminobutyric acid type A receptor subunit rho3
- External IDs: MGI: 3588203; GeneCards: GABRR3

Gene location (Human)
Chr.	Chromosome 3 (human)
Band	3q11.2	Start	97,985,102 bp
Band	3q11.2	End	98,035,315 bp

Gene location (Mouse)
Chr.	Chromosome 16 (mouse)
Band	16|16 C1.3	Start	59,227,695 bp
Band	16|16 C1.3	End	59,284,867 bp
RNA expression pattern
Bgee	Human / Mouse (ortholog); Top expressed in: testicle; gonad; islet of Langerhans; liver; right lobe of liver; spleen; nucleus accumbens / Top expressed in: primary oocyte; secondary oocyte; neural layer of retina; zygote; embryo; vasculature; vasculature of organ; spinal cord; temporal lobe; amygdala; More reference expression data
BioGPS	n/a
Gene ontology
Molecular function	chloride channel activity; GABA-A receptor activity; extracellular ligand-gated ion channel activity; ion channel activity; transmembrane signaling receptor activity; protein domain specific binding
Cellular component	membrane; integral component of membrane; cell junction; GABA-A receptor complex; plasma membrane; postsynaptic membrane; synapse; chloride channel complex; cellular component; integral component of plasma membrane; neuron projection
Biological process	gamma-aminobutyric acid signaling pathway; chloride transport; chloride transmembrane transport; ion transport; chemical synaptic transmission; ion transmembrane transport; signal transduction; regulation of membrane potential; nervous system process
Sources:Amigo / QuickGO
Orthologs
Databases	NCBI: entry; OMA: entry
Species	Human	Mouse
Entrez	200959	328699
Ensembl	ENSG00000183185	ENSMUSG00000074991
UniProt	A8MPY1	B2RXA8
RefSeq (mRNA)	NM_001105580	NM_001081190
RefSeq (protein)	NP_001099050	NP_001074659
Location (UCSC)	Chr 3: 97.99 – 98.04 Mb	Chr 16: 59.23 – 59.28 Mb
PubMed search
- Wikidata
View/Edit Human	View/Edit Mouse

Gamma-aminobutyric acid receptor subunit rho-3 is a protein that in humans is encoded by the GABRR3 gene. The protein encoded by this gene is a subunit of the GABA_{A}-ρ receptor.
