= GABRE =

Protein-coding gene in humans

Identifiers
- Aliases: GABRE, gamma-aminobutyric acid type A receptor epsilon subunit, gamma-aminobutyric acid type A receptor subunit epsilon
- External IDs: OMIM: 300093; GeneCards: GABRE

Gene location (Human)
Chr.	X chromosome (human)
Band	Xq28	Start	151,953,124 bp
Band	Xq28	End	151,974,680 bp
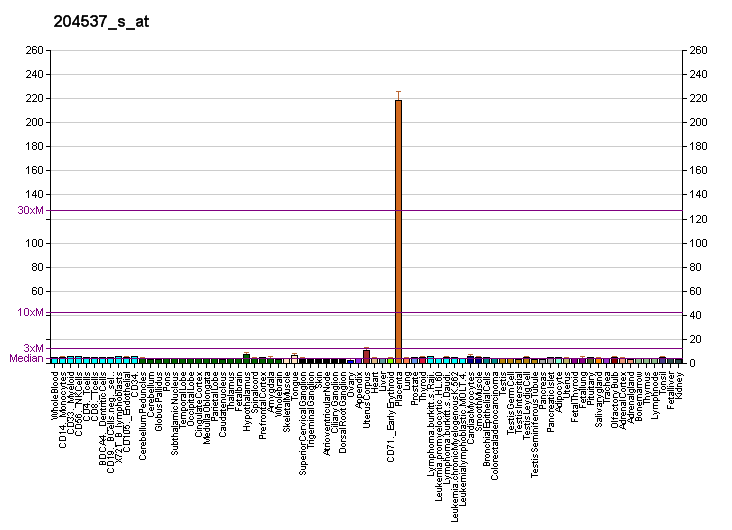
RNA expression pattern
Bgee	Human / Mouse (ortholog); Top expressed in: vagina; subcutaneous adipose tissue; apex of heart; ectocervix; canal of the cervix; skin of abdomen; minor salivary glands; skin of leg; popliteal artery; tibial arteries / n/a; More reference expression data
BioGPS	More reference expression data
Gene ontology
Molecular function	chloride channel activity; extracellular ligand-gated ion channel activity; GABA-gated chloride ion channel activity; GABA-A receptor activity; ion channel activity; transmembrane signaling receptor activity; inhibitory extracellular ligand-gated ion channel activity; benzodiazepine receptor activity; transmitter-gated ion channel activity involved in regulation of postsynaptic membrane potential
Cellular component	integral component of membrane; cell junction; postsynaptic membrane; plasma membrane; synapse; membrane; chloride channel complex; GABA-A receptor complex; integral component of plasma membrane; dendrite membrane; neuron projection; postsynapse
Biological process	ion transmembrane transport; chloride transport; chloride transmembrane transport; ion transport; negative regulation of chloride transport; signal transduction; gamma-aminobutyric acid signaling pathway; chemical synaptic transmission; regulation of membrane potential; nervous system process; synaptic transmission, GABAergic; regulation of postsynaptic membrane potential
Sources:Amigo / QuickGO
Orthologs
Databases	NCBI: entry; OMA: entry
Species	Human	Mouse
Entrez	2564	n/a
Ensembl	ENSG00000102287	n/a
UniProt	P78334	n/a
RefSeq (mRNA)	NM_004961; NM_021984; NM_021987; NM_021990	n/a
RefSeq (protein)	NP_004952	n/a
Location (UCSC)	Chr X: 151.95 – 151.97 Mb	n/a
PubMed search		n/a
- Wikidata
View/Edit Human

Gamma-aminobutyric acid receptor subunit epsilon is a protein that in humans is encoded by the GABRE gene.

The product of this gene belongs to the ligand-gated ionic channel (TC 1.A.9) family. It encodes the gamma-aminobutyric acid (GABA) A receptor which is a multisubunit chloride channel that mediates the fastest inhibitory synaptic transmission in the central nervous system. This gene encodes an epsilon subunit. It is mapped to chromosome Xq28 in a cluster of genes encoding alpha 3, beta 4 and theta subunits of the same receptor. Alternatively spliced transcript variants encoding different isoforms have been identified.

Brainstem expression of ε subunit-containing GABA_{A} receptors is upregulated during pregnancy, particularly in the ventral respiratory group.

== See also ==
- GABAA receptor
