= GABRG1 =

Protein-coding gene in the species Homo sapiens

Identifiers
- Aliases: GABRG1, gamma-aminobutyric acid type A receptor gamma1 subunit, gamma-aminobutyric acid type A receptor subunit gamma1
- External IDs: OMIM: 137166; MGI: 103156; GeneCards: GABRG1

Gene location (Human)
Chr.	Chromosome 4 (human)
Band	4p12	Start	46,035,769 bp
Band	4p12	End	46,124,054 bp

Gene location (Mouse)
Chr.	Chromosome 5 (mouse)
Band	5 C3.1|5 37.43 cM	Start	70,908,390 bp
Band	5 C3.1|5 37.43 cM	End	70,999,960 bp
RNA expression pattern
Bgee	Human / Mouse (ortholog); Top expressed in: internal globus pallidus; endothelial cell; external globus pallidus; Brodmann area 23; entorhinal cortex; caudate nucleus; nucleus accumbens; amygdala; Brodmann area 46; hypothalamus / Top expressed in: paraventricular nucleus of hypothalamus; ventromedial nucleus; lateral septal nucleus; dorsomedial hypothalamic nucleus; arcuate nucleus; suprachiasmatic nucleus; median eminence; lateral hypothalamus; globus pallidus; mammillary body; More reference expression data
BioGPS	n/a
Gene ontology
Molecular function	chloride channel activity; extracellular ligand-gated ion channel activity; GABA-A receptor activity; ion channel activity; transmembrane signaling receptor activity; GABA receptor binding; inhibitory extracellular ligand-gated ion channel activity; benzodiazepine receptor activity; GABA-gated chloride ion channel activity; transmitter-gated ion channel activity involved in regulation of postsynaptic membrane potential
Cellular component	integral component of membrane; cell junction; postsynaptic membrane; plasma membrane; receptor complex; synapse; membrane; chloride channel complex; integral component of plasma membrane; dendrite membrane; neuron projection; postsynapse; GABA-A receptor complex
Biological process	gamma-aminobutyric acid signaling pathway; ion transmembrane transport; chloride transport; chloride transmembrane transport; ion transport; chemical synaptic transmission; signal transduction; regulation of membrane potential; nervous system process; synaptic transmission, GABAergic; regulation of postsynaptic membrane potential
Sources:Amigo / QuickGO
Orthologs
Databases	NCBI: entry; OMA: entry
Species	Human	Mouse
Entrez	2565	14405
Ensembl	ENSG00000163285	ENSMUSG00000001260
UniProt	Q8N1C3	Q9R0Y8
RefSeq (mRNA)	NM_173536	NM_010252
RefSeq (protein)	NP_775807	NP_034382
Location (UCSC)	Chr 4: 46.04 – 46.12 Mb	Chr 5: 70.91 – 71 Mb
PubMed search
- Wikidata
View/Edit Human	View/Edit Mouse

Gamma-aminobutyric acid receptor subunit gamma-1 is a protein that in humans is encoded by the GABRG1 gene. The protein encoded by this gene is a subunit of the GABAA receptor.

Variants of this gene may be associated with alcohol dependence.
