= GABRG2 =

Protein-coding gene in the species Homo sapiens

An Error has occurred retrieving Wikidata item for infobox Gamma-aminobutyric acid receptor subunit gamma-2 is a protein that in humans is encoded by the GABRG2 gene.

== Function ==
Gamma-aminobutyric acid (GABA), the major inhibitory neurotransmitter in the brain, mediates neuronal inhibition by binding to GABA receptors. The type A GABA receptors are pentameric chloride channels assembled from among many genetic variants of GABA(A) subunits. This gene encodes the gamma 2 subunit of GABA(A) receptor. Mutations in this gene have been associated with epilepsy and febrile seizures. Alternative splicing of this gene results in transcript variants encoding different isoforms.

== Interactions ==
GABRG2 has been shown to interact with GABARAP and Dopamine receptor D5.

== See also ==
- GABAA receptor
