= 5-HT3 receptor =

Ionotropic serotonin receptor

The 5-HT_{3} receptors are a subclass of serotonin (5-HT) receptors. They belong to the Cys-loop superfamily of ligand-gated ion channels (LGICs) and differ structurally and functionally from all other serotonin receptors, which are G protein-coupled receptors. 5-HT_{3} receptors are cation channels, that is, they are permeable to sodium (Na), potassium (K), and calcium (Ca) ions and mediate neuronal depolarization and excitation within the central and peripheral nervous systems.

As with other ligand gated ion channels, the 5-HT_{3} receptor consists of five subunits arranged around a central ion conducting pore. Binding of the neurotransmitter serotonin (or 5-hydroxytryptamine) to the 5-HT_{3} receptor opens the channel, which, in turn, leads to an excitatory response in neurons. The rapidly activating, desensitizing, inward current is predominantly carried by sodium and potassium ions. 5-HT_{3} receptors have a negligible permeability to anions. They are most closely related by homology to the nicotinic acetylcholine receptor.

== Structure ==
The 5-HT_{3} receptor differs markedly in structure and mechanism from the other 5-HT receptor subtypes, which are all G-protein-coupled. A functional channel may be composed of five identical 5-HT_{3A} subunits (homopentameric) or a mixture of 5-HT_{3A} and one of the other four 5-HT_{3B}, 5-HT_{3C}, 5-HT_{3D}, or 5-HT_{3E} subunits (heteropentameric). It appears that only the 5-HT_{3A} subunits form functional homopentameric channels. All other subunit subtypes must heteropentamerize with 5-HT_{3A} subunits to form functional channels. Additionally, there has not currently been any pharmacological difference found between the heteromeric 5-HT_{3AC}, 5-HT_{3AD}, 5-HT_{3AE}, and the homomeric 5-HT_{3A} receptor. N-terminal glycosylation of receptor subunits is critical for subunit assembly and plasma membrane trafficking.

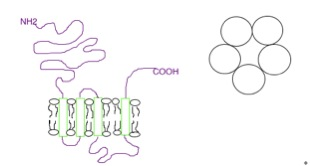
Figure 1. The subunits are assembled as a pentamer (right) and each subunit has four transmembrane domains (left).

The subunits surround a central ion channel in a pseudo-symmetric manner (Fig.1). Each subunit comprises an extracellular N-terminal domain which comprises the orthosteric ligand-binding site; a transmembrane domain consisting of four interconnected alpha helices (M1-M4), with the extracellular M2-M3 loop involved in the gating mechanism; a large cytoplasmic domain between M3 and M4 involved in receptor trafficking and regulation; and a short extracellular C-terminus (Fig.1). Whereas extracellular domain is the site of action of agonists and competitive antagonists, the transmembrane domain contains the central ion pore, receptor gate, and principle selectivity filter that allows ions to cross the cell membrane.

== Human and mouse genes ==
The genes encoding human 5-HT_{3} receptors are located on chromosomes 11 (HTR3A, HTR3B) and 3 (HTR3C, HTR3D, HTR3E), so it appears that they have arisen from gene duplications. The genes HTR3A and HTR3B encode the 5-HT_{3A} and 5-HT_{3B} subunits and HTR3C, HTR3D and HTR3E encode the 5-HT_{3C}, 5-HT_{3D} and 5-HT_{3E} subunits. HTR3C and HTR3E do not seem to form functional homomeric channels, but when co-expressed with HTR3A they form heteromeric complex with decreased or increased 5-HT efficacies. The pathophysiological role for these additional subunits has yet to be identified.

The human 5-HT_{3A} receptor gene is similar in structure to the mouse gene which has 9 exons and is spread over ~13 kb. Four of its introns are exactly in the same position as the introns in the homologous α7-acetylcholine receptor gene, clearly showing their evolutionary relationship.

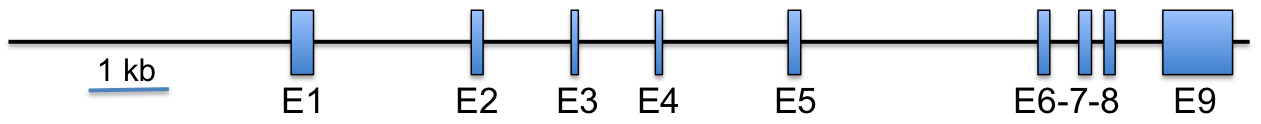
Figure 2. Structure of the mouse 5HT3 receptor gene, showing its 9 exons (E1-E9), corresponding to the exons shown in the cDNA below. The 5' ends of exons 2, 6, and 9 have alternative splice sites. Figure drawn to scale. Modified after Uetz et al. 1994.

Expression. The 5-HT_{3C}, 5-HT_{3D} and 5-HT_{3E} genes tend to show peripherally restricted pattern of expression, with high levels in the gut. In human duodenum and stomach, for example, 5-HT_{3C} and 5-HT_{3E} mRNA might be greater than for 5-HT_{3A} and 5-HT_{3B}.

Polymorphism. In patients treated with chemotherapeutic drugs, certain polymorphism of the HTR3B gene could predict successful antiemetic treatment. This could indicate that the 5-HTR3B receptor subunit could be used as biomarker of antiemetic drug efficacy.

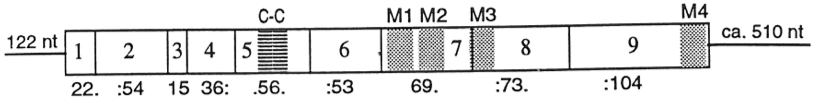
Figure 3. The cDNA sequence of the mouse 5HT3 receptor. The cDNA encodes a 122 nucleotide 5' UTR and a ~510 nucleotide 3' UTR. Boxes indicate exons and the numbers below the exons indicate their length. For instance, the first exon encodes 22 amino acids plus one nucleotide belonging to a split codon with another 2 nucleotides encoded by the next exon. M1-4 indicate the transmembrane helices and C-C indicates the Cysteine loop. Modified after Uetz et al. 1994

== Tissue distribution ==
The 5-HT_{3} receptor is expressed throughout the central and peripheral nervous systems and mediates a variety of physiological functions. On a cellular level, it has been shown that postsynaptic 5-HT_{3} receptors mediate fast excitatory synaptic transmission in rat neocortical interneurons, amygdala, and hippocampus, and in ferret visual cortex. 5-HT_{3} receptors are also present on presynaptic nerve terminals. There is some evidence for a role in modulation of neurotransmitter release, but evidence is inconclusive.

== Effects ==
When the receptor is activated to open the ion channel by agonists, the following effects are observed:

- CNS: nausea and vomiting center in brain stem, anxiety, as well as anticonvulsant and pro-nociceptive activity.
- PNS: neuronal excitation (in autonomic, nociceptive neurons), emesis.

== Ligands ==
=== Agonists ===
Agonists for the receptor include:

- Cereulide
- 2-methyl-5-HT
- Alpha-Methyltryptamine
- Bufotenin
- Chlorophenylbiguanide
- Ibogaine
- Phenylbiguanide
- Quipazine
- RS-56812 – Potent and selective 5-HT_{3} partial agonist, 1000× selectivity over other serotonin receptors
- SR-57227
- Varenicline
- YM-31636
- S 21007 (SAR c.f. CGS-12066A)

=== Antagonists ===
Antagonists for the receptor include:

- Antiemetics
  - Azasetron
  - Dolasetron
  - Granisetron
  - Ondansetron
  - Palonosetron
  - Tropisetron
- Gastroprokinetics and for IBS-D
  - Alosetron
  - Renzapride (partial)
  - Ramosetron
  - M1, the major active metabolite of mosapride
- Antidepressants
  - Mianserin
  - Mirtazapine
  - Vortioxetine
- Antipsychotics
  - Clozapine
  - Olanzapine
  - Quetiapine
- Antimalarials
  - Chloroquine
  - Mefloquine
  - Quinine
- Other drugs
  - Lamotrigine (epilepsy and bipolar disorder)
  - Memantine (Alzheimer's disease)
  - Metoclopramide (related to gastrointestinal tract and migraine)
  - Zacopride (anxiolytic and nootropic)
- Phytochemicals
  - Cannabidiol (CBD)
  - Menthol
  - Thujone
  - Tetrahydrocannabinol (THC)
- Unused
  - AS-8112
  - Cilansetron
  - BRL-46470
  - Batanopride
  - LY-278584
  - Tedatioxetine
  - Tropanserin
  - Zatosetron

=== Positive allosteric modulators ===
These agents are not agonists at the receptor, but increase the affinity or efficacy of the receptors for an agonist:

- Indole Derivatives
  - 5-chloroindole
- Small Organic Anaesthetics
  - Ethanol
  - Chloroform
  - Halothane
  - Isoflurane

=== Negative allosteric modulators ===
Negative allosteric modulators of the serotonin 5-HT_{3} receptor include bupropion and hydroxybupropion.

== Discovery ==
Identification of the 5-HT_{3} receptor did not take place until 1986, lacking selective pharmacological tools. However, with the discovery that the 5-HT_{3} receptor plays a prominent role in chemotherapy- and radiotherapy-induced vomiting, and the concomitant development of selective 5-HT_{3} receptor antagonists to suppress these side effects aroused intense interest from the pharmaceutical industry and therefore the identification of 5-HT_{3} receptors in cell lines and native tissues quickly followed.

== See also ==
- 5-HT_{1} receptor
- 5-HT_{2} receptor
- 5-HT_{4} receptor
- 5-HT_{5} receptor
- 5-HT_{6} receptor
- 5-HT_{7} receptor
