= GLRA1 =

Protein-coding gene in the species Homo sapiens

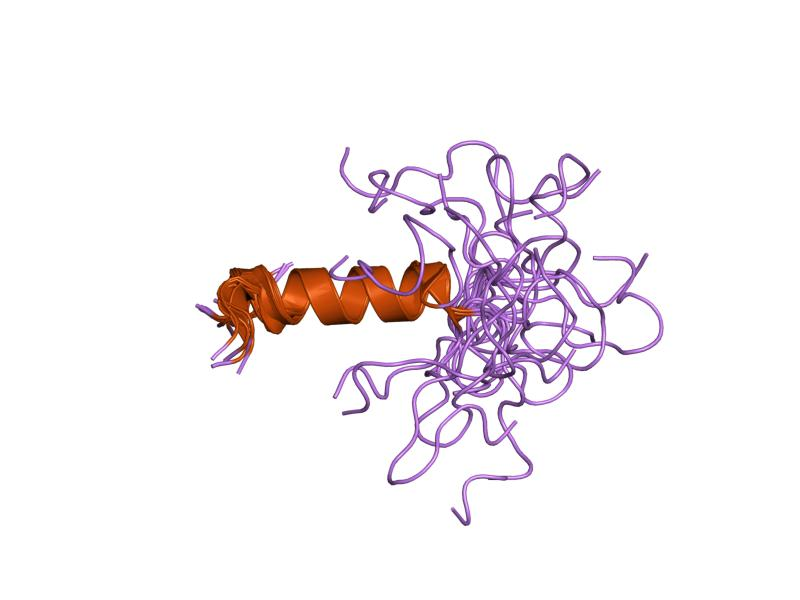

Identifiers
- Aliases: GLRA1, HKPX1, STHE, Glycine receptor, alpha 1, glycine receptor alpha 1
- External IDs: OMIM: 138491; MGI: 95747; GeneCards: GLRA1
Available structures
PDB	Ortholog search: PDBe RCSB
PDB	List of PDB id codes 1MOT, 1VRY, 2M6B, 2M6I, 4X5T

Gene location (Human)
Chr.	Chromosome 5 (human)
Band	5q33.1	Start	151,822,513 bp
Band	5q33.1	End	151,924,851 bp

Gene location (Mouse)
Chr.	Chromosome 11 (mouse)
Band	11 B1.3|11 33.12 cM	Start	55,405,064 bp
Band	11 B1.3|11 33.12 cM	End	55,499,024 bp
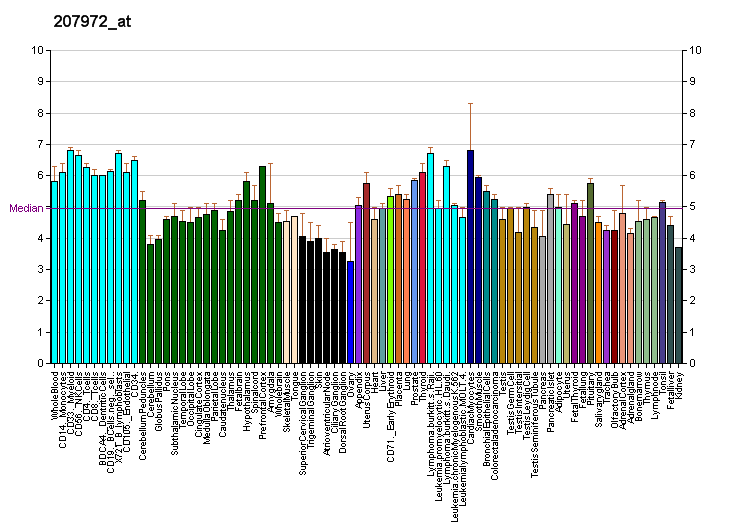
RNA expression pattern
Bgee	Human / Mouse (ortholog); Top expressed in: islet of Langerhans; testicle; hypothalamus; substantia nigra; C1 segment; ganglionic eminence; cerebellum; cerebellar cortex; cerebellar hemisphere; gonad / Top expressed in: medial vestibular nucleus; lumbar subsegment of spinal cord; ventromedial nucleus; pontine nuclei; anterior horn of spinal cord; dorsal tegmental nucleus; facial motor nucleus; deep cerebellar nuclei; superior colliculus; lateral hypothalamus; More reference expression data
BioGPS	More reference expression data
Gene ontology
Molecular function	zinc ion binding; glycine binding; metal ion binding; transmitter-gated ion channel activity; extracellularly glycine-gated chloride channel activity; protein binding; extracellularly glycine-gated ion channel activity; taurine binding; chloride channel activity; extracellular ligand-gated ion channel activity; ion channel activity; identical protein binding; transmembrane signaling receptor activity; transmitter-gated ion channel activity involved in regulation of postsynaptic membrane potential
Cellular component	integral component of membrane; perikaryon; postsynaptic membrane; cell projection; intracellular membrane-bounded organelle; membrane; plasma membrane; synapse; integral component of plasma membrane; inhibitory synapse; intracellular anatomical structure; chloride channel complex; cell junction; dendrite; endoplasmic reticulum; external side of plasma membrane; soma; neuron projection; calyx of Held; glycinergic synapse; integral component of presynaptic membrane; integral component of postsynaptic specialization membrane
Biological process	inhibitory postsynaptic potential; muscle contraction; startle response; neuromuscular process controlling posture; cellular response to ethanol; protein heterooligomerization; regulation of respiratory gaseous exchange; regulation of membrane potential; ion transport; anion transport; cellular response to zinc ion; regulation of respiratory gaseous exchange by nervous system process; acrosome reaction; positive regulation of acrosome reaction; neuromuscular process; cellular response to amino acid stimulus; synaptic transmission, glycinergic; action potential; chloride transport; righting reflex; neuropeptide signaling pathway; protein homooligomerization; negative regulation of transmission of nerve impulse; visual perception; adult walking behavior; chloride transmembrane transport; response to alcohol; excitatory postsynaptic potential; chemical synaptic transmission; ion transmembrane transport; signal transduction; response to amino acid; nervous system process
Sources:Amigo / QuickGO
Orthologs
Databases	NCBI: entry; OMA: entry
Species	Human	Mouse
Entrez	2741	14654
Ensembl	ENSG00000145888	ENSMUSG00000000263
UniProt	P23415	Q64018
RefSeq (mRNA)	NM_000171; NM_001146040; NM_001292000	NM_001290821; NM_020492
RefSeq (protein)	NP_000162; NP_001139512; NP_001278929	NP_001277750; NP_065238
Location (UCSC)	Chr 5: 151.82 – 151.92 Mb	Chr 11: 55.41 – 55.5 Mb
PubMed search
- Wikidata
View/Edit Human	View/Edit Mouse

Glycine receptor subunit alpha-1 is a protein that in humans is encoded by the GLRA1 gene.

== Function ==
The inhibitory glycine receptor mediates postsynaptic inhibition in the spinal cord and other regions of the central nervous system. It is a pentameric receptor composed solely of alpha subunits. The GLRB gene encodes the beta subunit of the receptor.

== Clinical significance ==
Mutations in the gene have been associated with hyperekplexia, a neurologic syndrome associated with an exaggerated startle reaction.

== See also ==
- Glycine receptor
- Stiff person syndrome
- Hyperekplexia
