= GLR =

GLR may refer to:

- Central Mountain Air, a Canadian airline
- Gartell Light Railway, in England
- Gaylord Regional Airport, in Michigan
- Glaro-Twabo language
- Glória Station, of the Rio de Janeiro Metro
- Gloucester Road tube station, London, London Underground station code
- George Lincoln Rockwell, of the American Nazi Party
- Green Label Relaxing, a sub-label of the Japanese clothing brand United Arrows
- GLRA2, a protein
- GLR parser
- Glycine receptor
- Greater London Radio, now BBC Radio London
- Grupo Latino de Radio, an American radio network
- Gwalior Light Railway, in India
- Great Lakes region, an area including states and provinces surrounding the Great Lakes
