= Cnx1 =

Cnx1 may refer to:

- Molybdopterin adenylyltransferase
- Molybdopterin molybdotransferase
