= MOEA =

MOEA may refer to:

- Molybdopterin molybdotransferase
- Ministry of Economic Affairs (Taiwan)
- Ministry of External Affairs (India)
- MOEA Framework
