= Collybistin =

Protein family

ARHGEF9
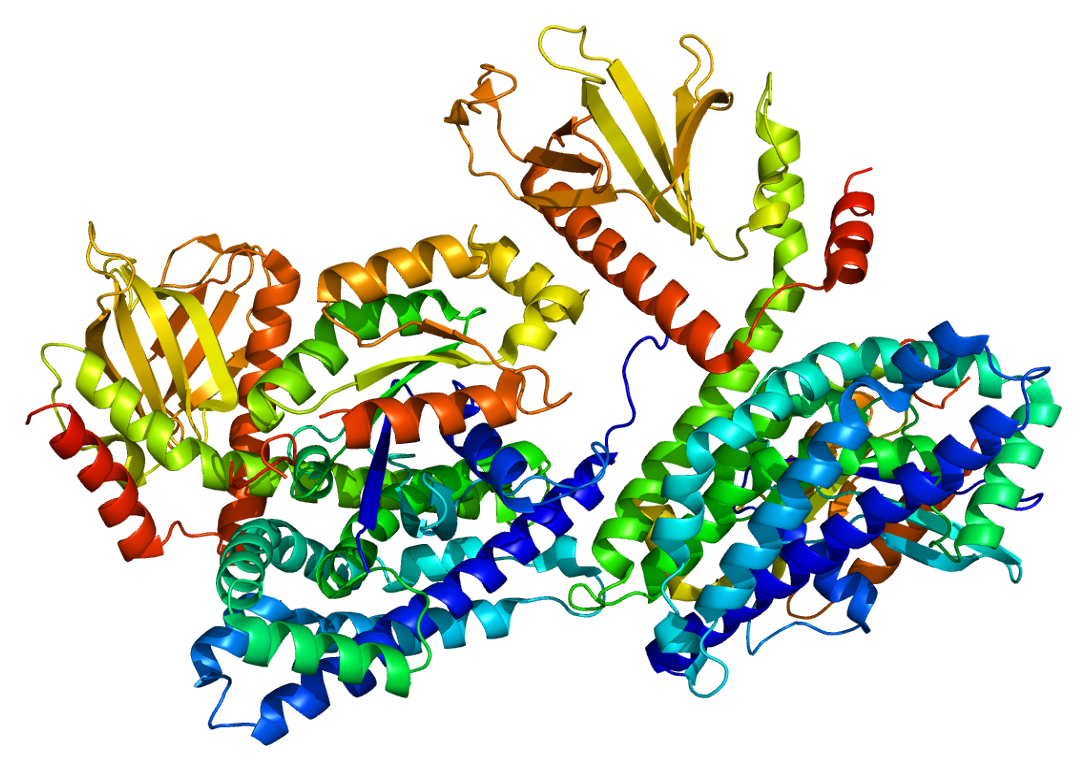

Identifiers
- Aliases: ARHGEF9, COLLYBISTIN, EIEE8, HPEM-2, PEM-2, PEM2, Cdc42 guanine nucleotide exchange factor 9, DEE8, Rho guanine nucleotide exchange factor 9, SH3 domain, protein family, IPR035728, Collybistin
- External IDs: OMIM: 300429; MGI: 2442233; GeneCards: ARHGEF9
Available structures
PDB	Ortholog search: PDBe RCSB
PDB	List of PDB id codes 2YSQ

Gene location (Human)
Chr.	X chromosome (human)
Band	Xq11.1	Start	63,634,967 bp
Band	Xq11.1	End	63,809,274 bp

Gene location (Mouse)
Chr.	X chromosome (mouse)
Band	X|X C3	Start	94,092,541 bp
Band	X|X C3	End	94,240,462 bp
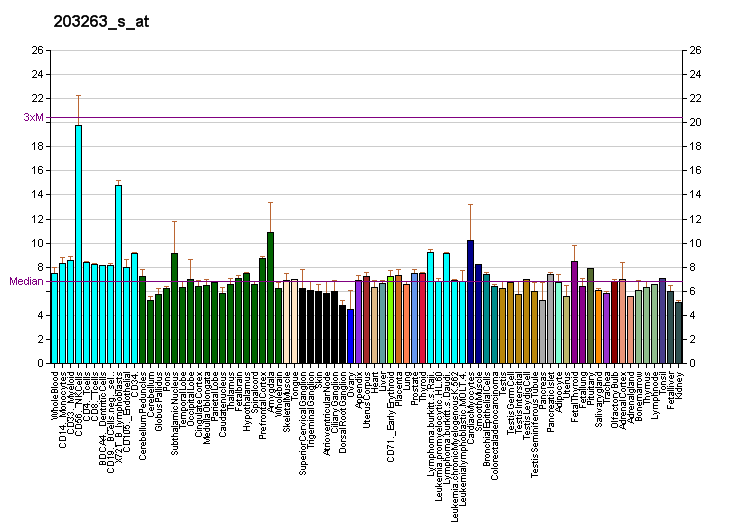

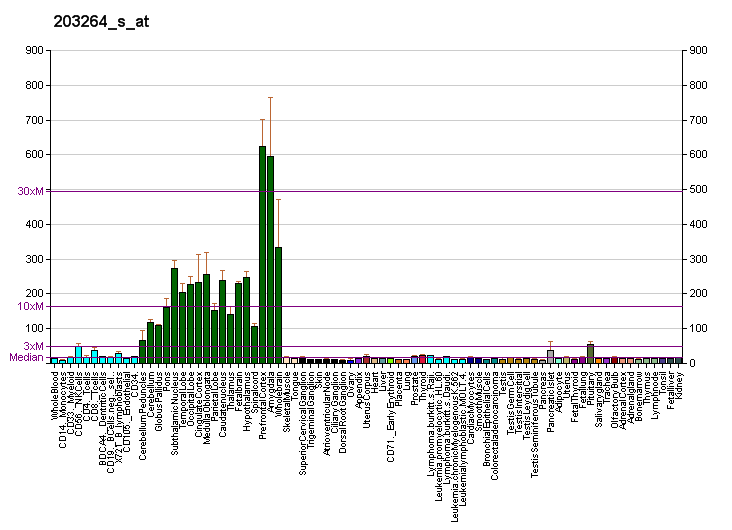
RNA expression pattern
Bgee	Human / Mouse (ortholog); Top expressed in: Brodmann area 46; prefrontal cortex; Region I of hippocampus proper; nucleus accumbens; lateral nuclear group of thalamus; parietal lobe; superior frontal gyrus; postcentral gyrus; right frontal lobe; dorsolateral prefrontal cortex / Top expressed in: superior frontal gyrus; dentate gyrus of hippocampal formation granule cell; primary visual cortex; olfactory tubercle; piriform cortex; primary motor cortex; cerebellar cortex; lateral septal nucleus; hippocampus proper; globus pallidus; More reference expression data
BioGPS	More reference expression data
Gene ontology
Molecular function	guanyl-nucleotide exchange factor activity
Cellular component	cytoplasm; cytosol; postsynaptic density; GABA-ergic synapse; plasma membrane; membrane; cell junction; synapse; postsynaptic membrane
Biological process	positive regulation of apoptotic process; regulation of Rho protein signal transduction; regulation of small GTPase mediated signal transduction; G protein-coupled receptor signaling pathway; regulation of postsynaptic specialization assembly
Sources:Amigo / QuickGO
Orthologs
Databases	NCBI: entry; OMA: entry
Species	Human	Mouse
Entrez	23229	236915
Ensembl	ENSG00000131089	ENSMUSG00000025656
UniProt	O43307	Q3UTH8
RefSeq (mRNA)	NM_001173479; NM_001173480; NM_015185; NM_001330495; NM_001353921 NM_001353922; NM_001353923; NM_001353924; NM_001353926; NM_001353927; NM_001353928; NM_001369030; NM_001369031; NM_001369032; NM_001369033; NM_001369034; NM_001369035; NM_001369036; NM_001369037; NM_001369038; NM_001369039; NM_001369040; NM_001369041; NM_001369042; NM_001369043; NM_001369044; NM_001369045	NM_001033329; NM_001290384; NM_001290385
RefSeq (protein)	NP_001166950; NP_001166951; NP_001317424; NP_056000; NP_001340850 NP_001340851; NP_001340852; NP_001340853; NP_001340855; NP_001340856; NP_001340857; NP_001355959; NP_001355960; NP_001355961; NP_001355962; NP_001355963; NP_001355964; NP_001355965; NP_001355966; NP_001355967; NP_001355968; NP_001355969; NP_001355970; NP_001355971; NP_001355972; NP_001355973; NP_001355974	NP_001028501; NP_001277313; NP_001277314; NP_001392830; NP_001392831 NP_001392832; NP_001392833; NP_001392834; NP_001392835; NP_001392836; NP_001392837; NP_001392838; NP_001392839; NP_001392840; NP_001392841; NP_001392842; NP_001392843; NP_001392844; NP_001392845; NP_001392846; NP_001392847
Location (UCSC)	Chr X: 63.63 – 63.81 Mb	Chr X: 94.09 – 94.24 Mb
PubMed search
- Wikidata
View/Edit Human	View/Edit Mouse

Collybistin

Identifiers
- Symbol: ARHGEF9
- NCBI gene: 23229
- RefSeq: NP_056000
- UniProt: O43307

Other data
- Locus: Chr. X q11.1
Search for
- Structures: Swiss-model
- Domains: InterPro

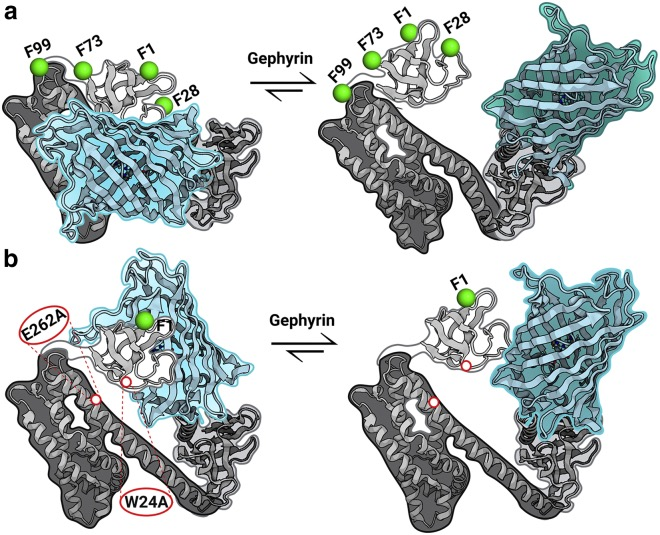
Collybistin Opening and Closing Structure

Collybistin is a brain specific protein identified as a regulator of the localization of gephyrin, a primary scaffolding protein. In humans, it is encoded by the ARHGEF9 gene. Collybistin induces the formation of submembrane gephyrin aggregates that accumulate glycine and GABA receptors. In 2000 it was identified as a gephyrin binding partner, and an important determinant of inhibitory postsynaptic membrane formation and plasticity. Gephyrin and collybistin are recruited to developing postsynaptic membranes of inhibitory synapses by the trans-synaptic adhesion molecule neuroligin-2, where they provide the scaffold for the clustering of inhibitory postsynaptic receptors to form a functioning inhibitory synapse.

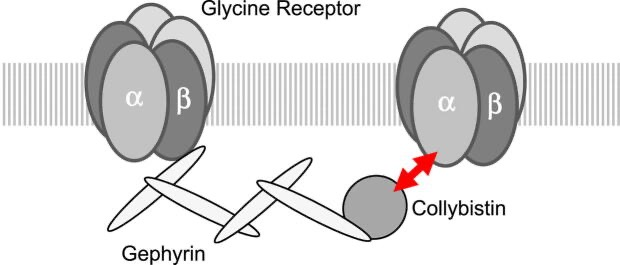
Collybistin guiding Gephyrin to the Glycine Receptor

== Structure ==
The gene ARHGEF9 (aka ARHDH) codes for Collybistin. ARHGEF9 can be found in various regions of the brain, such as the cerebral cortex, hippocampus and cerebellum, but only in locations where neurological synapse fire.There are three domains in the structure of collybistin; the src-homology 3 (SH3) domain, the dbl-homology (DH) domain, and the pleckstrin homology (PH) domain. The SH3 domain, located at the N-terminus, binds to the regulatory sequences and prevents the protein from staying active. SH3 acts as the regulator within the collybistin structure since most activity depends on the interactions with other proteins at the SH3 domain. Similarly, Without the PH domain, the protein is rendered useless as it cannot complete the plasma membrane targeting and clustering of gephrin. The DH domain is responsible for interacting and binding with GTPases. The DH domain regulates binding with gephrin.

Collybistin is categorized as a modular protein structure. The protein has the ability of rearranging its conformation to be more efficient in its activity, or folding certain domains to inhibit protein activity.

== Function ==
Collybistin is responsible for the gephyrin-dependent clustering of GABA receptors in the brain. ARHGEF9 functions to organize synapes and inhibit them when necessary. Additionally, ARHGEF9 is responsible guanine nucleotide exchange factors (GEFs). Through immunohistochemistry it was discovered that the production of collybistin changes throughout developmental stages of organisms. Any mutations within this gene may cause various negative symptoms within the organism. The organism may experience things such as intellectual disabilities, anxiety, hyperekplexia, etc. In a study done in 2011, there was a direct link found between a nonsynonymous deletion in the ARHGEF9 gene and mental disability, along with physical disability. Similarly, it has been reported that missense mutations within the gene have also caused mental and physical disabilities to the organism with the mutated gene.

== Clinical significance ==
Pentylenetetrazol (PTZ) induced seizures severely damage a wide range of synapes in the brain, including collybistin. However, when collybistin is overexpressed in the brain, it has the ability to prevent PTZ- induced seizures and protects the neurotransmitter pathways in the brain. If collybistin is not overexpressed and falls victim to PTZ, then gephrin is not clustered and synapes are not stabilized. Additionally, the inhibitory receptors become weakened, which may cause the seizure to become stronger and life-threatening.

Similarly, a missense mutation of the gene, referred to as a R290H gene variant, was recently discovered as a cause of epilepsy in human patients. This mutation alters the communication within the protein, specifically the folding of the DH and PH domains. Improper folding may lead to degradation or for the cell to be targeted by the ubiquitin proteasome pathway for termination. This mutation causes the protein to become weaker and prevents it from binding to other proteins, such as gephyrin, and inhibits plasma membrane connection. Similar to the PTZ-induced seizures, the R290H gene variant weakens the inhibitory receptors and prevents the development of the synapse. Due to activity of regulatory inhibition being reduced, the neurons become overactive, which leads to epilespy and other mental disabilities.

== Role in mortality ==
Without collybistin, there is a lack of proper regulator positioning, synapse organization, and inhibition signalling. Additionally, collybistin is responsible for synaptic scaffolding and cytoskeleton organization. With specific binding to the a2 subunit, collybistin is crucial for the proper function of sites that tell nuerons when to fire. In a 2018 study, a mutated collybistin protein lead to an increase in mortality rates in mice within the first 20 days after birth. The mice that faced early mortality had a disconnection in the neuropathways and receptors between collybistin and GABA_{A} receptors. The signalling from the GABA receptors became weaker and decayed at a more rapid rate. The animals suffer from spontaneous seizures that increased in strength each time. As seizure strength increased, there was a larger disruption in brain function and breathing. The seizures were identified as the ultimate cause of death, while a decline in the proper function of collybistin was found to be the proximate cause of death.

== Isoforms ==
There are currently 3 known isoforms of Collybistin. Each isoform is similar in that they contain a RhoGEF binding (DH) domain, and a pleckstrin homology (PH) domain. Where they differ is at the N-terminus in both sequence and whether or not a Src-homology (SH3) domain will be present. The SH3 group, which is responsible for the inhibition of protein activity, is connected to the N-Terminus of Collybistin. However, the isoform connected to the SH3- part of this terminus are constantly active and continuously signal to other proteins. This region is able to cluster gephrin without being instructed to do so by neurotransmitters or other proteins. The next isoform to discuss for Collybistin is connected to the SH3+ end of the N-Terminus. This isoform will remain folded until it is required for clustering. Similarly, the last isoform also remains folded until neuroligin-2 or neuroligin-4 bind to the protein. They also differ in the C-terminus sequence. The isoforms are referred to as CB1, CB2, and CB3. These three forms have been identified in rats, while only CB3 has been identified in humans and is referred to as hPEM2.

== Splice variants ==
Splice variants are the same proteins structurally, but they contain different mRNA sequences produced by alternative splicing. Splice variants of collybistin retain the DH and PH domains, however they dffer in the SH3 groups of the N-terminal and the C-terminal domain. SH3- variants are able to induce translocation to submembrane locations due to them being enzymatically active. The splice variant most commonly found in the central nervous system is SH3+. This splice variant is autoinhibited. The SH3+ and the SH3- variants both increase the production of gephyrin clustering. SH3+ does so by producing non-synaptic clusters that do not have fractions. Whereas, the SH3- variant focuses on the gephyrin clusters at postsynaptic sites. Additionally the SH3- variant is able to form ternary complexes, but SH3+ is unable to. Although these variants are able to increase the levels of gephyrin clustering, they also directly impact GABAergic synapse formation. Additionally, these any muattions related to these variants result in cognitive impairments.

== Resistance ==
The absence of collybistin is commonly noticed in the brain, especially not in the cerebral cortex, hippocampus, or cerebellum, however resistance to collybistin does occur. Parts of the brain remain completely normal in the absence of collybistin. There are several reasons why parts of the brain are resistant to this protein, such as, the presence of other proteins like SynArfGEF, different scaffolding processes, or even different synapses organization. Many times collybisitin is not needed for maintenance in every part of the brain. Inhibitory synapses that are resistant to collybistin are still able to maintain gephyrin clustering and GABA receptor anchoring, many times through the use of a different protein. Resistance is dependent one the synaptic site. Glycinergic synapses are able to function like normal with the deletion of collybistin, meaning that the protein is not essential in this area of brains synaptic system. Through the study of resistance to collybistin, it was found that there are backup mechanisms in the brain to attempt to alleviate the possible damage that a deletion of collybistin could cause.

== Related proteins ==
Gephyrin: Originally discovered in 1982, this scaffolding protein is required for the clustering of glycine and γ-aminobutyric receptors. Similarly to collybistin, this protein is necessary for brain function and has three domains; the G domain, C domain, and the E domain. The C domain is responsible for binding to other proteins and post-translational modifications. The G and E domain are responsible for clustering gephyrin into large structures. Gephyrin is located near inhibitory synapses under the cell membrane, especially close to where glycine and GABA signalling occurs. This protein adds structure and ensures proper function of the brain inhibitory system.

Neuroglin-2 (NL2): This protein also inhibits synaptic activity. As a postsynaptic adhesion protein, NL2 is bound to neurexin in the postsynaptic membrane. The binding of these two proteins craetes a connection between the postsynaptic membrane and the presynaptic membrane. This allows for neurotransmitters to align with the receptors. Additionally NL2 activates collybistin activity in the SH3+ isoform and directs the process of scaffolding formation.

Cdc42: This protein is a trafficking regulator a part of the Rho family of GTPases. Cdc42 onitors the protein activity in the membrane and assists in directing proteins to the correct areas; this is done through blocking certain pathways so proteins do not end up in an area they are not needed. This protein is also essential in the proper function of NL2. In activated forms, are directly associated with the COPI complex and activates signally pathways. Cdc42 then helps to align gephyrin in the membrane for collybistin to bind. If Cdc42 stays active or stays inactive, then its trafficking network no longer works.

TC10: This protein, a part of the Rho family of GTPases, regulates signalling pathways and cytoskeleton remodeling. TC10 adds strcture to the cell and assists in controlling the behavior of the cell. Additionally, TC10 switched between active and inactive states to control molecular processing. In its active state, TC10 has long and strong membrane extensions with low GTPase activity. This protein is located near the nucleus of the cell.

GABA_{A} Receptor: The GABA_{A} receptor is one of the primary inhibitory receptors in the brain. These receptors are Ligand-gated ion channels that open during binding of neurotransmitters. There are five subunit proteins of the GABA receptors and those five subunits each have subunits of their own. There are both synaptic and extrasynaptic GABA receptors. Synaptic receptors are located in postsynaptic sites and cause fast inhibition that lasts a short amount of time. Extrasynaptic receptors are located outside of the synapses and cause slower and long lasting inhibition. Collybistin helps to keep the receptors position at the synapses and anchors them.

Profilin: This protein binds to gephyrin and helps to maintain the structure of the cell membrane to allow for clustering. This protein is an actin regulator that is typically found in eukaryotes. Profilin I can be found in most mammalian cells, whereas Profilin IIa is found in the neurological cells in mammals. Profilin helps wil regulation and organization of actin filaments. Additionally, once Profilin is directly bound to gephyrin, it assists in building large clustered structures.

== Interactions ==
ARHGEF9 has been shown to interact with GPHN and SMURF1.
