= Gephyrin =

Type of protein

GPHN
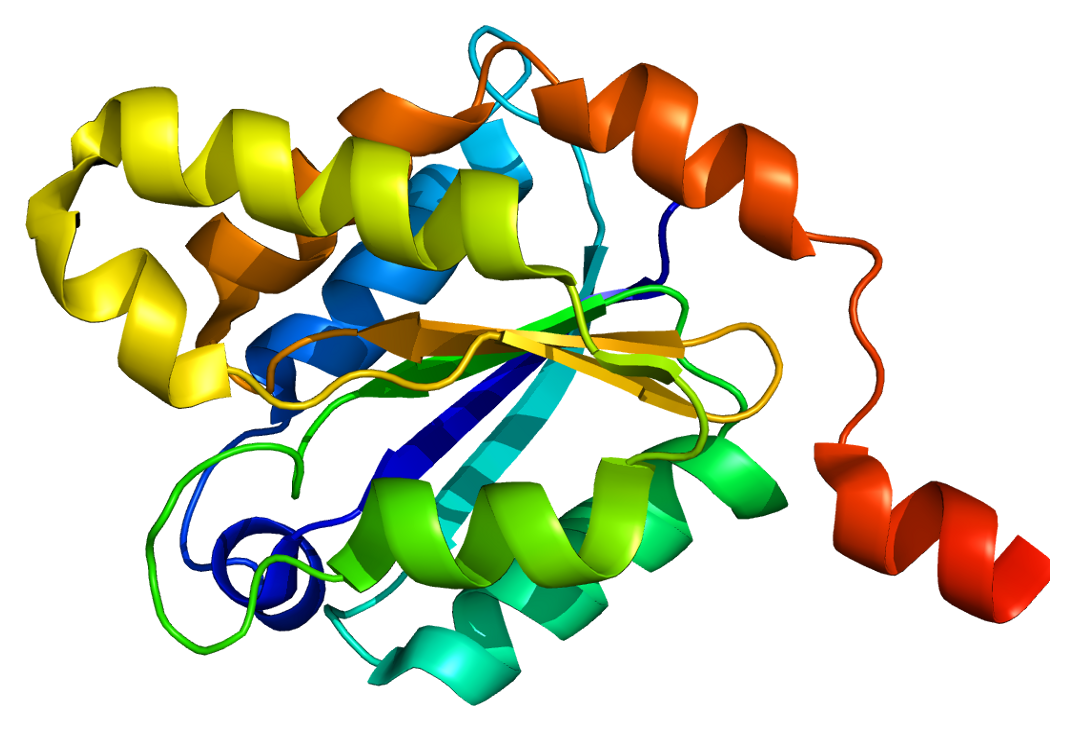

Identifiers
- Aliases: GPHN, GEPH, GPH, GPHRYN, HKPX1, MOCODC, gephyrin
- External IDs: OMIM: 603930; MGI: 109602; GeneCards: GPHN
Available structures
PDB	Ortholog search: PDBe RCSB
PDB	List of PDB id codes 1JLJ
Enzyme activity
EC #	BRENDA	ExPASy	KEGG	MetaCyc
2.7.7.75	↗	↗	↗	↗
2.10.1.1	↗	↗	↗	↗

Gene location (Human)
Chr.	Chromosome 14 (human)
Band	14q23.3-q24.1	Start	66,507,407 bp
Band	14q23.3-q24.1	End	67,181,803 bp

Gene location (Mouse)
Chr.	Chromosome 12 (mouse)
Band	12|12 C3	Start	78,273,153 bp
Band	12|12 C3	End	78,731,546 bp
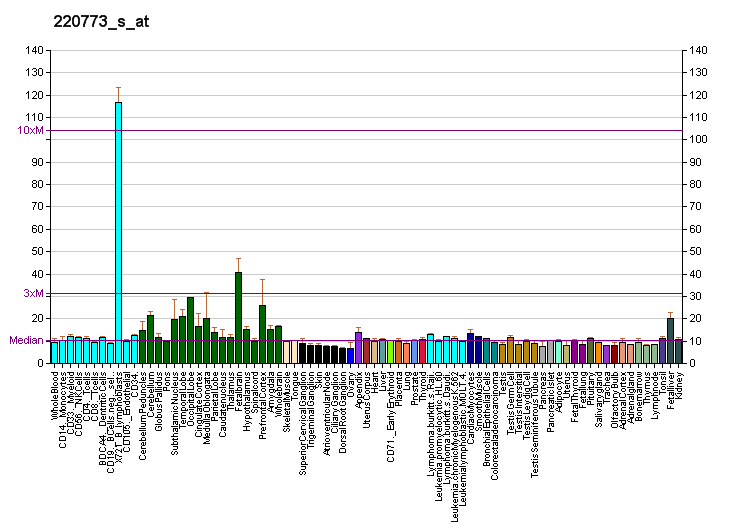
RNA expression pattern
Bgee	Human / Mouse (ortholog); Top expressed in: cerebellar cortex; cerebellar hemisphere; right hemisphere of cerebellum; right lobe of liver; prefrontal cortex; right frontal lobe; anterior cingulate cortex; primary visual cortex; caudate nucleus; nucleus accumbens / Top expressed in: spermatid; extensor digitorum longus muscle; dentate gyrus of hippocampal formation granule cell; saccule; mammillary body; lobe of cerebellum; plantaris muscle; cerebellar vermis; muscle of thigh; anterior amygdaloid area; More reference expression data
BioGPS	More reference expression data
Gene ontology
Molecular function	transferase activity; nucleotide binding; molybdopterin molybdotransferase activity; metal ion binding; protein binding; catalytic activity; molybdopterin adenylyltransferase activity; ATP binding; nitrate reductase activity; molybdopterin cofactor binding
Cellular component	cytoplasm; postsynaptic membrane; membrane; plasma membrane; synapse; cell junction; cytoskeleton; cell projection; dendrite; postsynaptic density; cytosol; postsynaptic specialization; postsynaptic specialization membrane
Biological process	gamma-aminobutyric acid receptor clustering; glycine receptor clustering; Mo-molybdopterin cofactor biosynthetic process; molybdenum incorporation into molybdenum-molybdopterin complex; metabolism; response to metal ion; molybdopterin cofactor biosynthetic process; establishment of synaptic specificity at neuromuscular junction; postsynaptic neurotransmitter receptor diffusion trapping
Sources:Amigo / QuickGO
Orthologs
Databases	NCBI: entry; OMA: entry
Species	Human	Mouse
Entrez	10243	268566
Ensembl	ENSG00000171723	ENSMUSG00000047454
UniProt	Q9NQX3	Q8BUV3
RefSeq (mRNA)	NM_001024218; NM_020806; NM_001377514; NM_001377515; NM_001377516 NM_001377517; NM_001377518; NM_001377519	NM_145965; NM_172952
RefSeq (protein)	NP_001019389; NP_065857; NP_001364443; NP_001364444; NP_001364445 NP_001364446; NP_001364447; NP_001364448	NP_666077; NP_766540
Location (UCSC)	Chr 14: 66.51 – 67.18 Mb	Chr 12: 78.27 – 78.73 Mb
PubMed search
- Wikidata
View/Edit Human	View/Edit Mouse

Gephyrin is a protein that in humans is encoded by the GPHN gene.

This gene encodes a neuronal assembly protein that anchors inhibitory neurotransmitter receptors to the postsynaptic cytoskeleton via high affinity binding to a receptor subunit domain and tubulin dimers. In nonneuronal tissues, the encoded protein is also required for molybdenum cofactor biosynthesis. Mutations in this gene may be associated with the neurological condition hyperekplexia and also lead to molybdenum cofactor deficiency.

== Gene ==
Numerous alternatively spliced transcript variants encoding different isoforms have been described; however, the full-length nature of all transcript variants is not currently known.

The production of alternatively spliced variants is affected by noncoding regions within the gene. There are two major, very different variants among human populations in these regulatory regions termed "yin" and "yang".

== Function ==
Gephyrin is a 93kDa multi-functional protein that is a component of the postsynaptic protein network of inhibitory synapses. It consists of 3 domains: N terminal G domain, C terminal E domain, and a large unstructured linker domain which connects the two. Although there are structures available for trimeric G and dimeric E domains, there is no structure available for the full length protein, which may be due to the large unstructured region which makes the protein hard to crystallize. But a recent study of the full length gephyrin by small-angle X-ray scattering shows that it predominantly forms trimers, and that because of its long linker region, it can exist in either a compact state or either of two extended states.

=== Neuronal structure ===
Positive antibody staining for gephyrin at a synapse is most of the time consistent with the presence of glycine and/or GABA_{A} receptors. Nevertheless, some exceptions can occur like in neurons of Dorsal Root Ganglions where gephyrin is absent despite the presence of GABA_{A} receptors. Gephyrin is considered a major scaffolding protein at inhibitory synapses, analogous in its function to that of PSD-95 at glutamatergic synapses. Gephyrin was identified by its interaction with the glycine receptor, the main receptor protein of inhibitory synapses in the spinal cord and brainstem. In addition to its interaction with the glycine receptor, recent publications have shown that gephyrin also interacts with the intracellular loop between the transmembrane helices TM3 and TM4 of alpha and beta subunits of the GABA_{A} receptor.

Gephyrin displaces GABA receptors from the GABARAP/P130 complex, then brings the receptors to the synapse. Once at the synapse, the protein binds to collybistin and neuroligin 2. In cells, gephyrin appears to form oligomers of at least three subunits. Several splice variants have been described that prevent this oligomerization without influencing the affinity for receptors. They nevertheless affect the composition of inhibitory synapses and can even play a role in diseases like epilepsy.

=== Moco biosynthesis ===
The gephyrin protein is also required for insertion of molybdenum into molybdopterin. In the penultimate step, N-terminal G domain adenylate the apo form of the molybdopterin to form the intermediate adenylated molybdopterin (molybdopterin adenylyltransferase). In the terminal step, the C-terminal E domain catalyzes the deadenylation and also the metal insertion mechanism (molybdopterin molybdenumtransferase).

== Clinical significance ==
Humans with temporal lobe epilepsy have been found to have abnormally low levels of gephyrin in their temporal lobes. In animal models, a total lack of gephyrin results in stiff muscles and death immediately after birth. Stiff muscles are also a symptom of startle disease, that can be caused by a mutation in the gephyrin gene. And if a person produces auto-antibodies against gephyrin, this can even result in stiff person syndrome.

== Yin-yang sequences ==
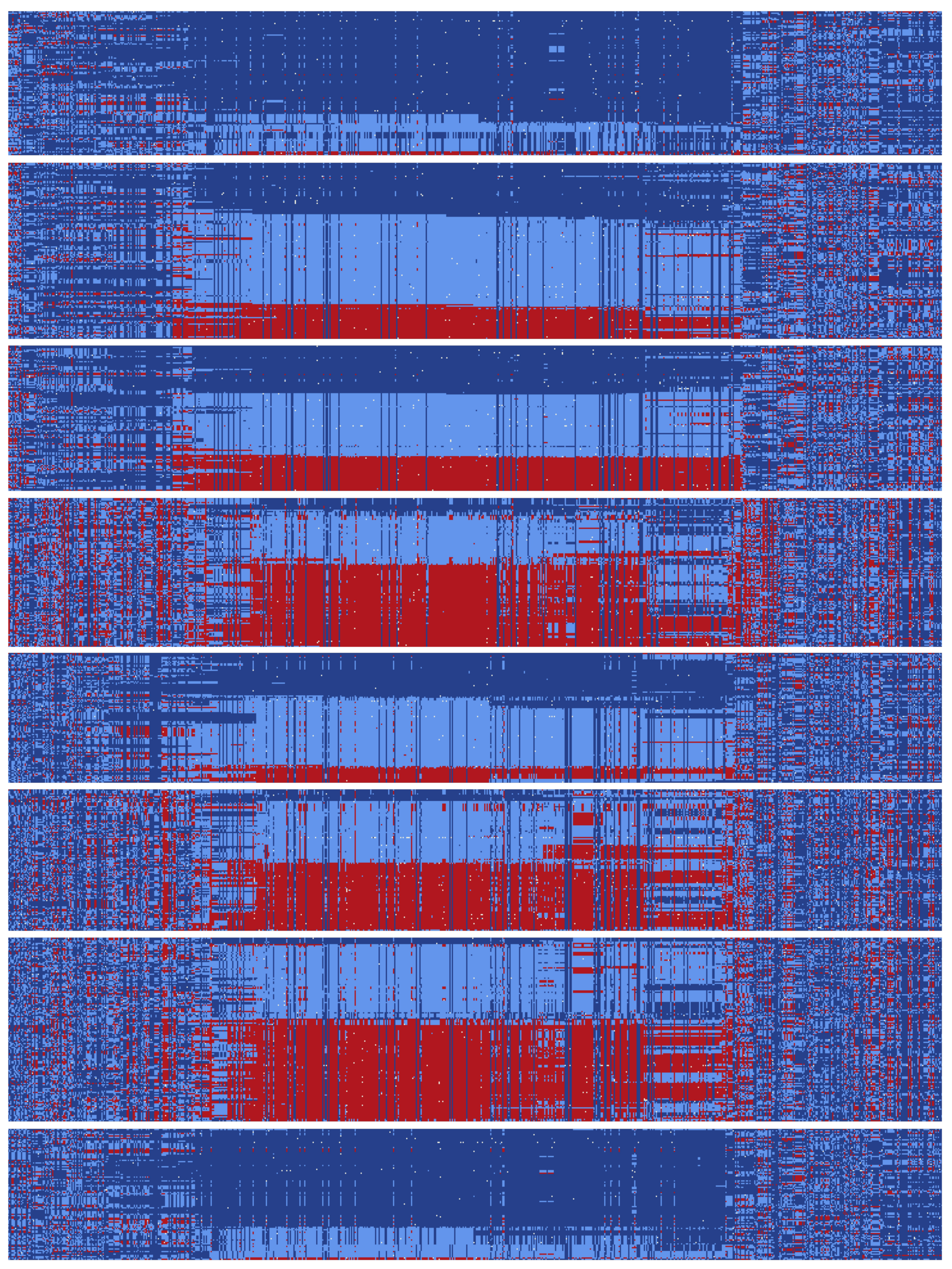
Yin-yang DNA sequences encompassing human gephyrin gene. Yin-yang haplotypes arise when a stretch of DNA evolves to present two divergent forms. This image shows the states for ~1000 markers in the genomic region centered on gephyrin for 934 individuals in eight global populations. Humans carry pairs of chromosomes, so each individual possesses two copies of the gephyrin gene. Dark blue and red horizontal lines in the yin-yang region represent individuals carrying two yin and two yang haplotypes, respectively, and light blue represents individuals carrying both a yin and a yang haplotype.

At some point in human history, there was a DNA sequence encompassing gephyrin that split and followed two divergent evolutionary paths. These types of splits can occur when two populations become isolated from each other or when a chromosomal region does not experience recombination events. The two sequences that split from the ancestral sequence each acquired more than a hundred mutations that subsequently became common. This happened in a relatively short time on an evolutionary scale, as hundreds of mutations were fixed in distinct ‘yin’ and ‘yang’ sequences prior to human migration to Asia. It has been reported that currently Asians carry nearly equal numbers of yin and yang sequences and global populations representing every major human ancestry possess both yin and yang sequences. The existence of this massive yin-yang pattern suggests that two completely divergent evolutionary paths rapidly progressed during human history, presumably achieving the common goal of enhancing regulation of gephyrin.

== Interactions ==
GPHN has been shown to interact with Mammalian target of rapamycin and ARHGEF9.
