= Satoyoshi syndrome =

- Other names: Komuragaeri disease
- Specialty: Immunology

Satoyoshi syndrome, also known as Komuragaeri syndrome, is a rare progressive disorder of presumed autoimmune cause, characterized by painful muscle spasms, alopecia, diarrhea, endocrinopathy with amenorrhoea, and secondary skeletal abnormalities. The syndrome was first reported in 1967 by Eijiro Satoyoshi and Kaneo Yamada in Tokyo, Japan. To this date, fewer than 50 cases worldwide have been reported for the syndrome.

People with the syndrome typically develop symptoms of the illness at a young age, usually between 6 and 15 years old. The initial symptoms are muscle spasms in the legs and alopecia (hair loss). The spasms are painful and progressive, and their frequency varies from a few to 100 per day, each lasting a few minutes. It can be sufficiently severe to produce abnormal posturing of the affected limbs, particularly the thumbs. With progression, the illness involves the pectoral girdle and trunk muscles and finally the masseters and temporal muscles. The spasms usually spare the facial muscles. Severe spasms can interfere with respiration and speech. During an attack-free period, stimulus-insensitive myoclonus can occur in the arms, legs, and neck. Diarrhea occurs in the first 2–3 years with intolerance to carbohydrate and high-glucose diets. Endocrinopathy manifests as amenorrhea and hypoplasia of the uterus. Affected children fail to attain height after 10–12 years of age.

The syndrome is not known to be a primary cause of mortality, but some patients have died as a result of secondary complications, such as respiratory failure and malnourishment. In one 6-year-old patient, antibodies to GABA-producing enzyme glutamate decarboxylase were detected.

== See also ==
- Stiff-person syndrome
