= GAD1 =

Protein found in humans

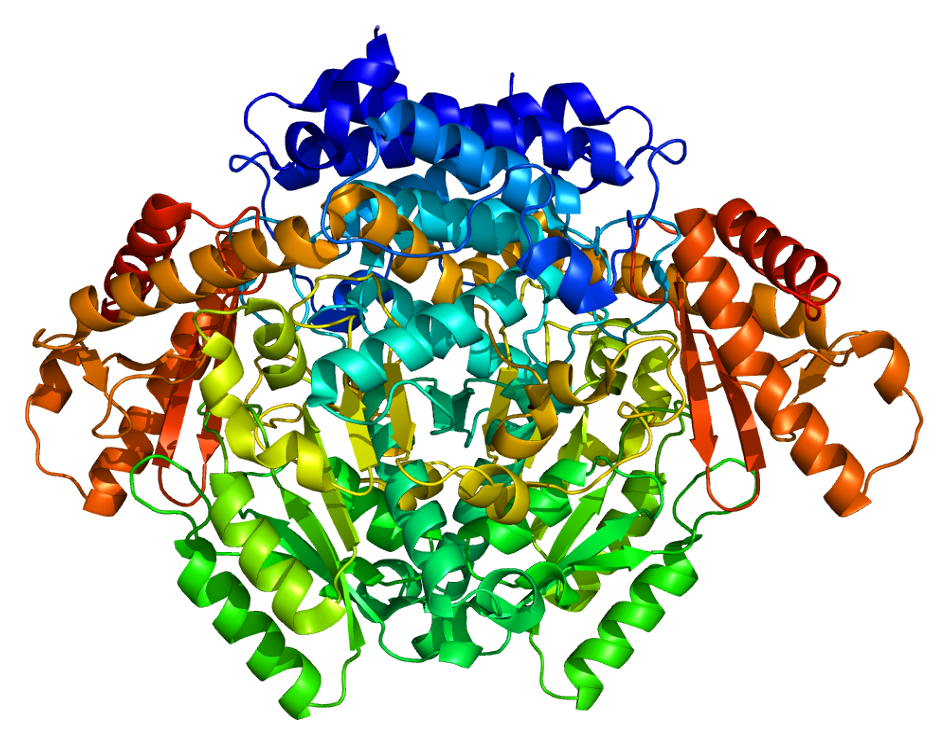

Identifiers
- Aliases: GAD1, CPSQ1, GAD, SCP, glutamate decarboxylase 1, DEE89
- External IDs: OMIM: 605363; MGI: 95632; GeneCards: GAD1
Available structures
PDB	Ortholog search: PDBe RCSB
PDB	List of PDB id codes 2OKJ, 3VP6
Enzyme activity
EC #	BRENDA	ExPASy	KEGG	MetaCyc
4.1.1.15	↗	↗	↗	↗

Gene location (Human)
Chr.	Chromosome 2 (human)
Band	2q31.1	Start	170,813,213 bp
Band	2q31.1	End	170,861,151 bp

Gene location (Mouse)
Chr.	Chromosome 2 (mouse)
Band	2 C2|2 41.63 cM	Start	70,383,416 bp
Band	2 C2|2 41.63 cM	End	70,432,358 bp
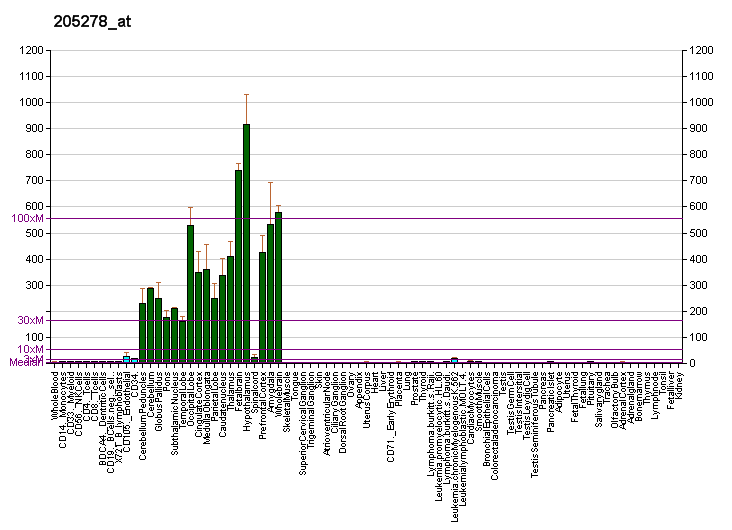

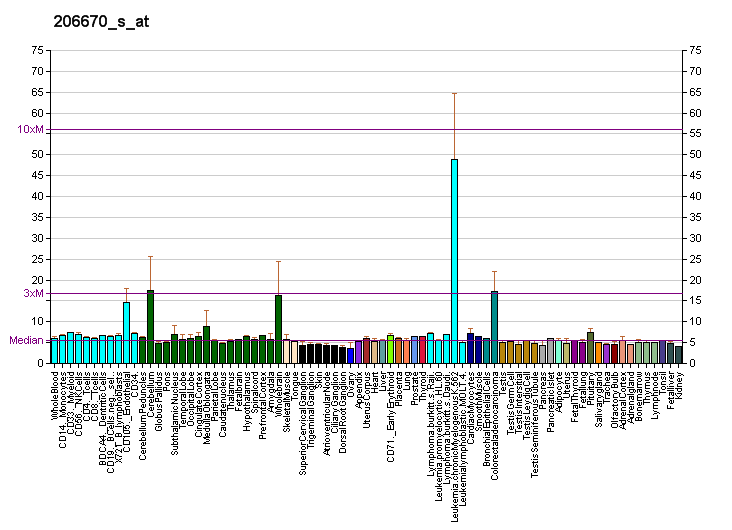

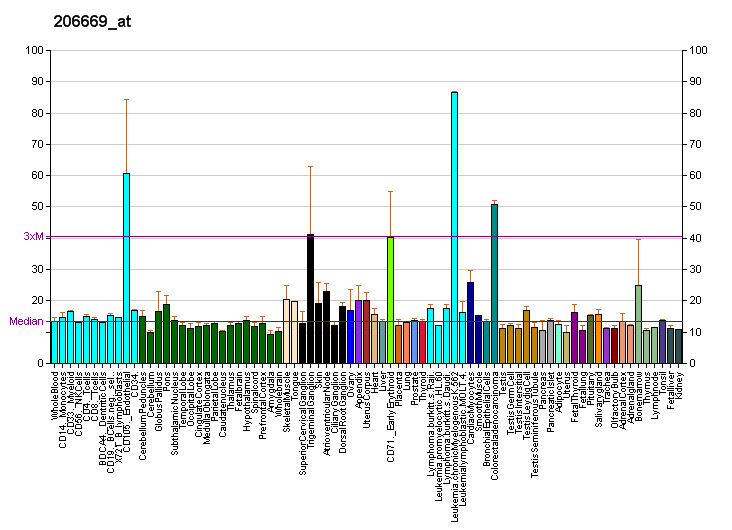
RNA expression pattern
Bgee	Human / Mouse (ortholog); Top expressed in: endothelial cell; middle temporal gyrus; Brodmann area 23; Brodmann area 10; external globus pallidus; lateral nuclear group of thalamus; primary visual cortex; frontal pole; orbitofrontal cortex; paraflocculus of cerebellum / Top expressed in: lateral septal nucleus; pallidum of neuraxis; globus pallidus; dorsal tegmental nucleus; lobe of cerebellum; cerebellar vermis; lateral geniculate nucleus; olfactory tubercle; nucleus accumbens; dorsomedial hypothalamic nucleus; More reference expression data
BioGPS	More reference expression data
Gene ontology
Molecular function	protein binding; catalytic activity; lyase activity; protein heterodimerization activity; pyridoxal phosphate binding; carboxy-lyase activity; glutamate binding; glutamate decarboxylase activity; protein N-terminus binding
Cellular component	vesicle membrane; plasma membrane; clathrin-sculpted gamma-aminobutyric acid transport vesicle membrane; intracellular anatomical structure; presynaptic active zone; cytoplasm; cell cortex; axon; axon terminus; neuron projection terminus; synapse; inhibitory synapse
Biological process	gamma-aminobutyric acid biosynthetic process; glutamate catabolic process; carboxylic acid metabolic process; neurotransmitter biosynthetic process; protein-pyridoxal-5-phosphate linkage; glutamate decarboxylation to succinate; chemical synaptic transmission; social behavior; locomotory exploration behavior; neurotransmitter secretion
Sources:Amigo / QuickGO
Orthologs
Databases	NCBI: entry; OMA: entry
Species	Human	Mouse
Entrez	2571	14415
Ensembl	ENSG00000128683	ENSMUSG00000070880
UniProt	Q99259	P48318
RefSeq (mRNA)	NM_000817; NM_013445	NM_008077; NM_001312900
RefSeq (protein)	NP_000808; NP_038473	NP_001299829; NP_032103
Location (UCSC)	Chr 2: 170.81 – 170.86 Mb	Chr 2: 70.38 – 70.43 Mb
PubMed search
- Wikidata
View/Edit Human	View/Edit Mouse

Glutamate decarboxylase 1 (brain, 67kDa) (GAD67), also known as GAD1, is a human gene.

This gene encodes one of several forms of glutamic acid decarboxylase, identified as a major autoantigen in insulin-dependent diabetes. The enzyme encoded is responsible for catalyzing the production of gamma-aminobutyric acid from L-glutamic acid. A pathogenic role for this enzyme has been identified in the human pancreas since it has been identified as an autoantigen and an autoreactive T cell target in insulin-dependent diabetes. This gene may also play a role in the stiff man syndrome. Deficiency in this enzyme has been shown to lead to pyridoxine dependency with seizures. Alternative splicing of this gene results in two products, the predominant 67-kD form and a less-frequent 25-kD form.

== Interactions ==
GAD1 has been shown to interact with GAD2.

== See also ==
- Glutamate decarboxylase
