= GAD2 =

Protein-coding gene in humans

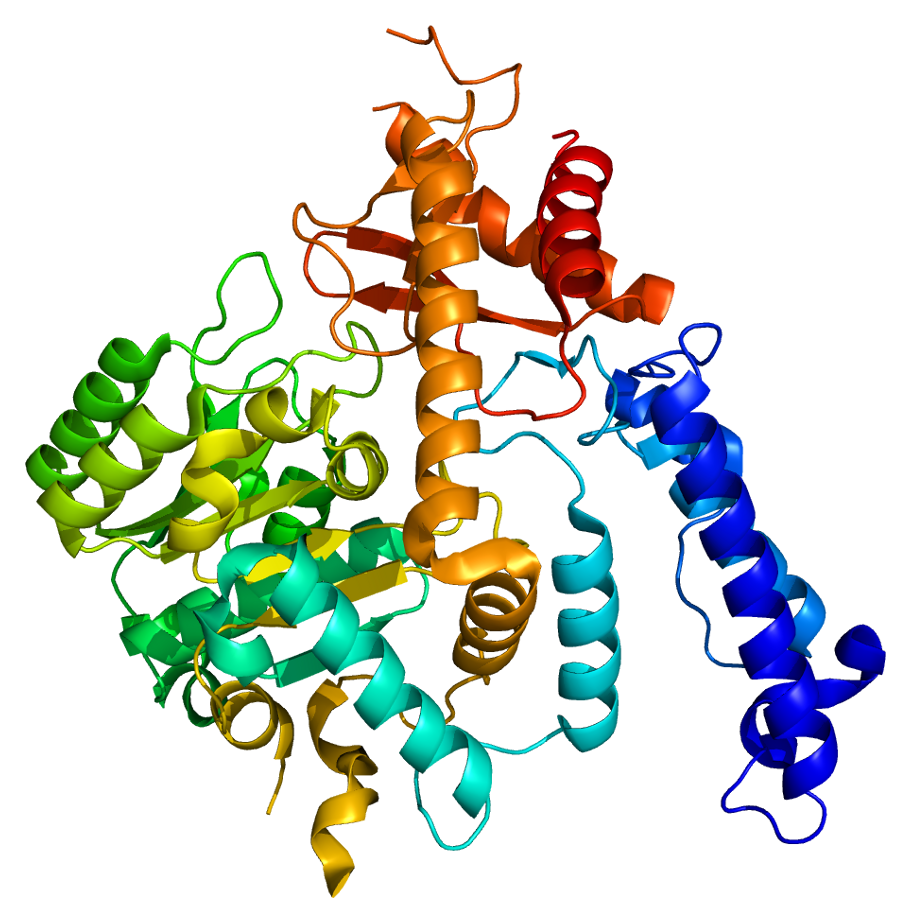

Identifiers
- Aliases: GAD2, GAD65, glutamate decarboxylase 2
- External IDs: OMIM: 138275; MGI: 95634; GeneCards: GAD2
Available structures
PDB	Ortholog search: PDBe RCSB
PDB	List of PDB id codes 1ES0, 2OKK
Enzyme activity
EC #	BRENDA	ExPASy	KEGG	MetaCyc
4.1.1.15	↗	↗	↗	↗

Gene location (Human)
Chr.	Chromosome 10 (human)
Band	10p12.1	Start	26,216,665 bp
Band	10p12.1	End	26,304,558 bp

Gene location (Mouse)
Chr.	Chromosome 2 (mouse)
Band	2 A3|2 15.15 cM	Start	22,512,217 bp
Band	2 A3|2 15.15 cM	End	22,583,886 bp
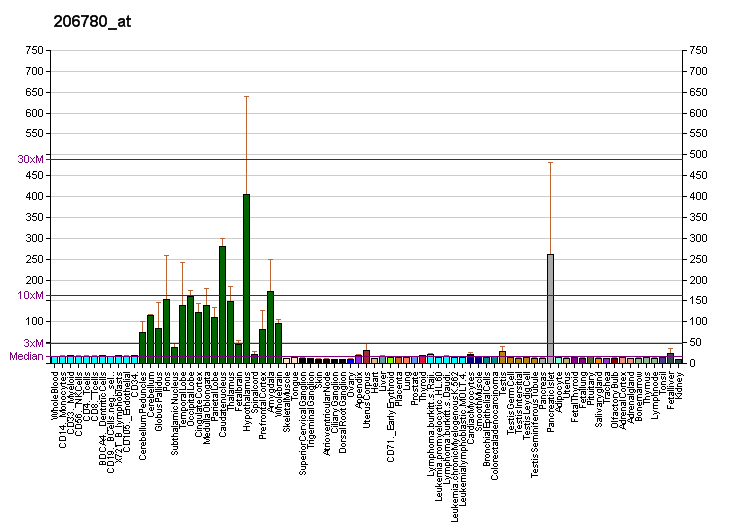

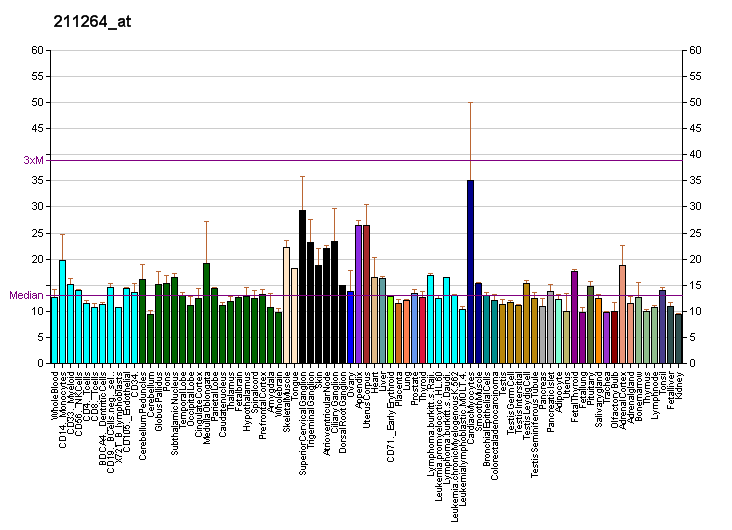

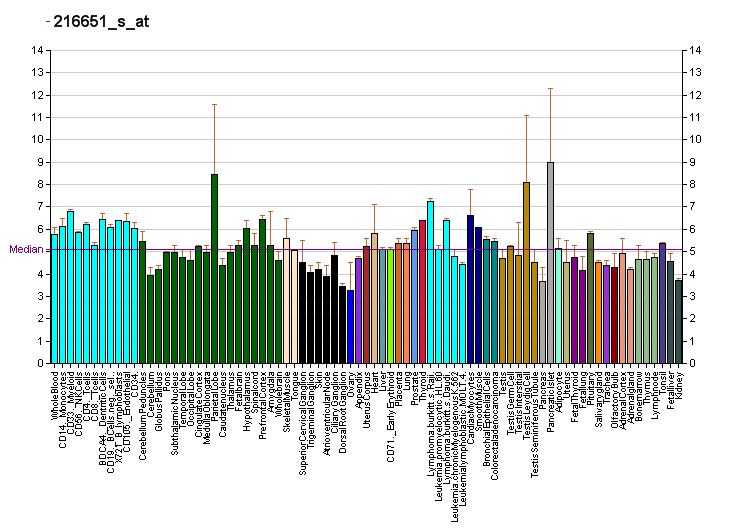
RNA expression pattern
Bgee	Human / Mouse (ortholog); Top expressed in: islet of Langerhans; nucleus accumbens; beta cell; putamen; caudate nucleus; endothelial cell; orbitofrontal cortex; external globus pallidus; middle frontal gyrus; Brodmann area 46 / Top expressed in: olfactory tubercle; lateral septal nucleus; paraventricular nucleus of hypothalamus; globus pallidus; dorsal tegmental nucleus; lateral hypothalamus; nucleus accumbens; superior frontal gyrus; lateral geniculate nucleus; dorsomedial hypothalamic nucleus; More reference expression data
BioGPS	More reference expression data
Gene ontology
Molecular function	protein binding; catalytic activity; lyase activity; protein heterodimerization activity; pyridoxal phosphate binding; carboxy-lyase activity; glutamate binding; glutamate decarboxylase activity
Cellular component	cytoplasm; cytosol; Golgi apparatus; membrane; Golgi membrane; plasma membrane; clathrin-sculpted gamma-aminobutyric acid transport vesicle membrane; synapse; inhibitory synapse; synaptic vesicle membrane; axon; cell junction; perinuclear region of cytoplasm; anchored component of membrane; presynaptic membrane; cytoplasmic vesicle
Biological process	carboxylic acid metabolic process; neurotransmitter biosynthetic process; glutamate decarboxylation to succinate; chemical synaptic transmission; neurotransmitter secretion
Sources:Amigo / QuickGO
Orthologs
Databases	NCBI: entry; OMA: entry
Species	Human	Mouse
Entrez	2572	14417
Ensembl	ENSG00000136750	ENSMUSG00000026787
UniProt	Q05329	P48320
RefSeq (mRNA)	NM_001134366; NM_000818	NM_008078
RefSeq (protein)	NP_000809; NP_001127838	NP_032104
Location (UCSC)	Chr 10: 26.22 – 26.3 Mb	Chr 2: 22.51 – 22.58 Mb
PubMed search
- Wikidata
View/Edit Human	View/Edit Mouse

Glutamate decarboxylase 2 is an enzyme that in humans is encoded by the GAD2 gene.

This gene encodes one of several forms of glutamic acid decarboxylase, identified as a major autoantigen in insulin-dependent diabetes. The enzyme encoded is responsible for catalyzing the production of gamma-aminobutyric acid from L-glutamic acid. A pathogenic role for this enzyme has been identified in the human pancreas since it has been identified as an autoantibody and an autoreactive T cell target in insulin-dependent diabetes. This gene may also play a role in the stiff-person syndrome.

== Interactions ==
GAD2 has been shown to interact with GAD1.

== See also ==
- Glutamate decarboxylase
