= GLRA3 =

Protein-coding gene in the species Homo sapiens

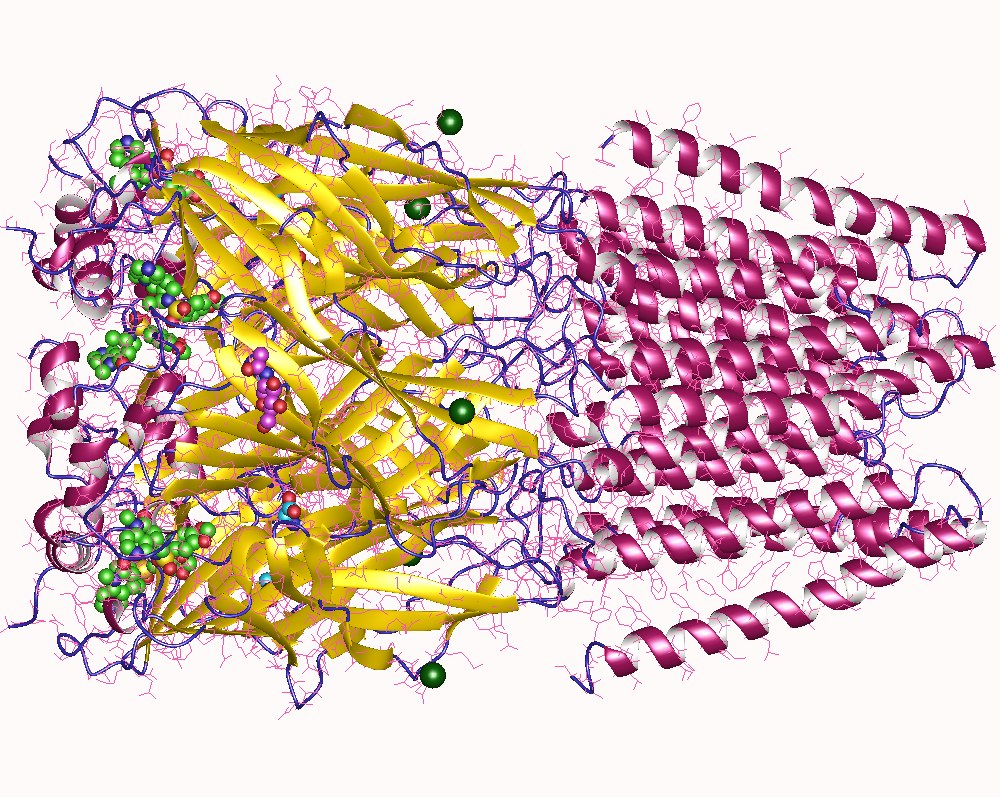

Identifiers
- Aliases: GLRA3, glycine receptor alpha 3
- External IDs: OMIM: 600421; MGI: 95749; GeneCards: GLRA3
Available structures
PDB	Ortholog search: PDBe RCSB
PDB	List of PDB id codes 5CFB

Gene location (Human)
Chr.	Chromosome 4 (human)
Band	4q34.1	Start	174,636,920 bp
Band	4q34.1	End	174,829,247 bp

Gene location (Mouse)
Chr.	Chromosome 8 (mouse)
Band	8 B2|8 29.69 cM	Start	56,393,495 bp
Band	8 B2|8 29.69 cM	End	56,583,105 bp
RNA expression pattern
Bgee	Human / Mouse (ortholog); Top expressed in: testicle; pancreatic ductal cell; prefrontal cortex; islet of Langerhans; gonad; Brodmann area 9; cingulate gyrus; anterior cingulate cortex; right frontal lobe; hypothalamus / Top expressed in: substantia nigra; ventromedial nucleus; ventral tegmental area; anterior amygdaloid area; dorsomedial hypothalamic nucleus; superior colliculus; paraventricular nucleus of hypothalamus; lumbar subsegment of spinal cord; lateral hypothalamus; utricle; More reference expression data
BioGPS	n/a
Gene ontology
Molecular function	glycine-gated chloride ion channel activity; glycine binding; metal ion binding; transmitter-gated ion channel activity; chloride channel activity; extracellular ligand-gated ion channel activity; extracellularly glycine-gated chloride channel activity; ion channel activity; transmembrane signaling receptor activity
Cellular component	integral component of membrane; perikaryon; postsynaptic membrane; cell projection; membrane; plasma membrane; synapse; integral component of plasma membrane; chloride channel complex; glycine-gated chloride channel complex; cell junction; dendrite; neuron projection
Biological process	response to amino acid; chloride transmembrane transport; ion transport; synaptic transmission, glycinergic; chloride transport; neuropeptide signaling pathway; protein homooligomerization; excitatory postsynaptic potential; ion transmembrane transport; signal transduction; chemical synaptic transmission; regulation of membrane potential; nervous system process
Sources:Amigo / QuickGO
Orthologs
Databases	NCBI: entry; OMA: entry
Species	Human	Mouse
Entrez	8001	110304
Ensembl	ENSG00000145451	ENSMUSG00000038257
UniProt	O75311	Q91XP5
RefSeq (mRNA)	NM_001042543; NM_006529	NM_080438; NM_001368774
RefSeq (protein)	NP_001036008; NP_006520	NP_536686; NP_001355703
Location (UCSC)	Chr 4: 174.64 – 174.83 Mb	Chr 8: 56.39 – 56.58 Mb
PubMed search
- Wikidata
View/Edit Human	View/Edit Mouse

The Glycine receptor subunit alpha-3 is a protein that in humans is encoded by the GLRA3 gene. The protein encoded by this gene is a subunit of the glycine receptor.
