= Opiranserin =

Chemical compound

Clinical data
- Other names: VVZ-149; VVZ-000149
- Routes of administration: Intravenous
- ATC code: None

Identifiers
- IUPAC name: 4-Butoxy-N-([4-(dimethylamino)oxan-4-yl]methyl)-3,5-dimethoxybenzamide
- CAS Number: 1441000-45-8
- PubChem CID: 71566778
- UNII: AP031EC2NI

Chemical and physical data
- Formula: C_{21}H_{34}N_{2}O_{5}
- Molar mass: 394.512 g·mol^{−1}
- 3D model (JSmol): Interactive image
- SMILES: O=C(NCC1(N(C)C)CCOCC1)C2=CC(OC)=C(OCCCC)C(OC)=C2
- InChI: InChI=1S/C21H34N2O5/c1-6-7-10-28-19-17(25-4)13-16(14-18(19)26-5)20(24)22-15-21(23(2)3)8-11-27-12-9-21/h13-14H,6-12,15H2,1-5H3,(H,22,24); Key:JQUVQWMHZSYCRQ-UHFFFAOYSA-N

Opiranserin (INN; developmental code name VVZ-149) is a selective and combined glycine GlyT2 transporter blocker (IC_{50} = 0.86 μM), purine P2X_{3} receptor antagonist (IC_{50} = 0.87 μM), and serotonin 5-HT_{2A} receptor antagonist (IC_{50} = 1.3 μM) which is under development by Vivozon for the intravenous treatment of postoperative pain. As of April 2017, it is in phase II clinical trials for this indication. The INN of the drug was issued in 2017. Approved for post-operative pain management in South Korea in December 2024.

== See also ==
- Serotonin 5-HT_{2A} receptor antagonist
