= Hyperekplexia =

Genetic disorder causing an exaggerated startle response

- Other names: Exaggerated surprise, exaggerated startle response, startle disease
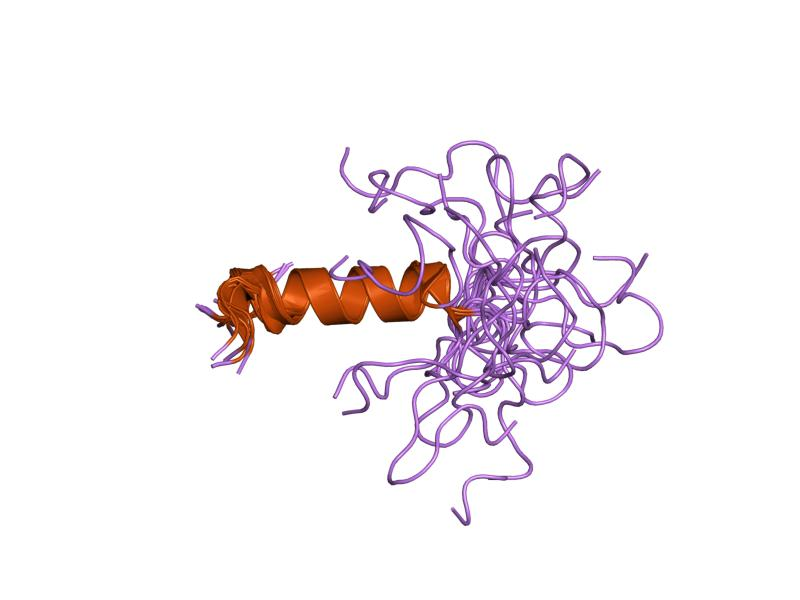
- Mutations of the neuroreceptor glycine receptor subunit alpha-1 (GLRA1) can cause hyperekplexia.
- Pronunciation: /ˌhaɪ.pɚ.ɛkˈplɛk.si.ə/
- Specialty: Neurology
- Symptoms: Increased startle response to sudden auditory, visual, or tactile stimulation
- Complications: Increased alcohol and drug use
- Duration: Chronic
- Causes: Mutation of either the GLRA1 gene, GLRB gene, SLC6A5 gene, X-linked (ARHGEF9) gene, or GPHN gene
- Medication: Clonazepam, diazepam, or phenobarbital; carbamazepine; 5-hydroxytryptophan; phenytoin; valproate; piracetam
- Frequency: 1 in 40,000

Hyperekplexia (/ˌhaɪ.pər.ɛkˈplɛk.si.ə/; "exaggerated surprise") is a neurological disorder characterized by a pronounced startle response to tactile or acoustic stimuli and an ensuing period of hypertonia. The hypertonia may be predominantly truncal, attenuated during sleep, or less prominent after one year of age.

Classic hyperekplexia is caused by genetic mutations in a number of different genes, all of which play an important role in glycine neurotransmission. Glycine is used by the central nervous system as an inhibitory neurotransmitter. Hyperekplexia is generally classified as a genetic disease; some disorders can mimic the exaggerated startle of hyperekplexia.

== Signs and symptoms ==
The three main signs of hyperekplexia are generalized stiffness, excessive startle response beginning at birth, and nocturnal myoclonus. Affected individuals are fully conscious during episodes of stiffness, which consist of forced closure of the eyes and an extension of the extremities followed by a period of generalised stiffness and uncontrolled falling at times. Initially, the disease was classified into a "major" and a "minor" form, with the minor form being characterized by an excessive startle reflex, but lacking stiffness. Genetic evidence has only been found for the major form of the condition.

Other signs and symptoms of hyperekplexia may include episodic neonatal apnea, excessive movement during sleep and the head-retraction reflex. The link to some cases of sudden infant death remains controversial.

== Genetics ==
Hyperekplexia is known to be caused by a variety of genes, encoding both pre- and postsynaptic proteins. The symptoms displayed, as well as the types of inheritance, vary, based on the affected gene, as discussed in detail below.

=== GLRA1 ===
The first gene linked conclusively to hyperekplexia was GLRA1. The GLRA1 gene encodes the glycine receptor, alpha 1 subunit, which, together with the glycine receptor beta subunit, forms synaptic glycine receptors. Inhibitory glycine receptors are ligand-gated chloride channels that facilitate fast responses in the brainstem and spinal-cord. Homomeric glycine receptors composed exclusively of alpha-1 subunits exhibit normal ion channel electrophysiology, but are not sequestered at the synaptic junction. Wild-type glycine receptors are thus presumed to be pentameric heteromers of the alpha-1 and beta subunits, in either a 3:2 or 2:3 ratio.

Within these heteromers, it is believed that the alpha-1 subunits bind glycine and undergo a conformational change, inducing a conformational change in the pentamer, causing the ion-channel to open. Although autosomal dominant inheritance was initially reported, there are at least as many cases described with autosomal recessive inheritance. Thus far, the general rule is that mutations causing structurally normal proteins that cannot bind glycine or cannot properly undergo a required conformational change in response to glycine will result in a dominant form of the disease, while mutations that result in truncated or greatly malformed subunits that cannot be integrated into a receptor protein will result in a recessive form.

=== GLRB ===
The GLRB gene encodes the beta subunit of the glycine receptor. Homomeric glycine receptors composed of beta subunits do not open in response to glycine stimulation, however, the beta subunit is essential for proper receptor localization, through its interactions with gephyrin, which results in receptor clustering at the synaptic cleft. As such, the defects within the GLRB gene show autosomal recessive inheritance.

=== SLC6A5 ===
The SLC6A5 gene encodes the GlyT2 transporter, a neuronal pre-synaptic glycine re-uptake transporter. In comparison to the GlyT1 transporter, found mostly in glial cells, GlyT2 helps maintain a high concentration of glycine within the axon terminal of glycinergic neurons. Mutations of the SLC6A5 gene have been associated with hyperekplexia in an autosomal recessive inheritance pattern. Defects within this gene are hypothesized either to affect the incorporation of the transporter into the cellular membrane or to affect its affinity for the molecules it transports: sodium ions, chloride ions and glycine. Any of these actions would drastically reduce the pre-synaptic cell's ability to produce the high vesicular concentrations of glycine necessary for proper glycine neurotransmission. GPHN and ARHGEF9 are often included in lists of genetic causes of hyperekplexia - but, in fact, they produce a much more complex phenotype, very distinct from classical hyperekplexia. As such they are no longer considered to be causative genes.

=== GPHN ===
Gephyrin, an integral membrane protein believed to coordinate glycine receptors, is coded by the gene GPHN. A heterozygous mutation in this gene has been identified in one sporadic case of hyperekplexia, though experimental data is inconclusive as to whether the mutation itself is, in fact, pathogenic. Gephyrin is essential for glycine receptor clustering at synaptic junctions, through its action of binding both the glycine receptor beta subunit and internal cellular microtubule structures. Gephyrin also assists in clustering GABA receptors at synapses and molybdenum cofactor synthesis. Because of gephyrin's multi-functional nature, in mutated form it is not presumed to be a common genetic source of hyperekplexia.

=== ARHGEF9 ===
A defect within the gene coding for collybistin, ARHGEF9, has been shown to cause hyperekplexia occurring with epilepsy. Since the ARHGEF9 gene is on the X chromosome, this gene displays X-linked recessive heritance. The collybistin protein is responsible for proper gephyrin targeting, which is crucial for the proper localization of glycine and GABA receptors. Deficiencies in collybistin function would result in a lack of glycine and GABA receptors at the synaptic cleft.

== Diagnosis ==
There are three signs used to diagnose if an infant has hereditary hyperekplexia: if the child's body is stiff all over as soon as they are born, if they overreact to noises and other stimuli, and if the reaction to stimuli is followed by an overall stiffness where the child is unable to make any voluntary movements. A combination of electroencephalogram and an electromyogram may help diagnose this condition in patients who have not displayed symptoms as children. The electroencephalogram will not show abnormal activity other than a spike in wakefulness or alertness, while the electromyogram will show rapid muscular responses and hyperreflexia. Otherwise, genetic testing is the only definitive diagnosis. MRIs and CT scans will be normal unless other conditions are present.

== Treatment ==
The most commonly used effective treatment is clonazepam, which leads to the increased efficacy of another inhibitory neurotransmitter, GABA. There are anecdotal reports of the use of levetiracetam in genetic and acquired hyperekplexia. During attacks of hypertonia and apnea, the limbs and head may be forcibly manipulated towards the trunk in order to resolve the symptoms. This is referred to as the "Vigevano maneuver'.

== History ==
The disorder was first described in 1958 by Kirstein and Silfverskiold, who reported a family with 'drop seizures'. In 1962 Drs. Kok and Bruyn reported an unidentified hereditary syndrome, which initially presented as hypertonia in infants. Genetic analysis within this large Dutch pedigree revealed a mutation within the GLRA1 gene, the first gene to be implicated in hyperekplexia.

== See also ==
- Startle response
- Myotonia
- Jumping Frenchmen of Maine
- Latah
- Stiff-person syndrome
- Hyperreflexia
