= GLRA4 =

Protein-coding gene in the species Homo sapiens

Identifiers
- Aliases: GLRA4, glycine receptor alpha 4, glycine receptor alpha 4 (pseudogene)
- External IDs: MGI: 95750; GeneCards: GLRA4

Gene location (Mouse)
Chr.	X chromosome (mouse)
Band	X F1|X 59.1 cM	Start	135,658,423 bp
Band	X F1|X 59.1 cM	End	135,680,890 bp
Orthologs
Databases	NCBI: entry
Species	Human	Mouse
Entrez	441509	14657
Ensembl	n/a	ENSMUSG00000018595
UniProt	n a	Q61603
RefSeq (mRNA)	NM_001172285; NM_001024452	NM_010297
RefSeq (protein)	NP_001019623; NP_001165756	NP_034427
Location (UCSC)	n/a	Chr X: 135.66 – 135.68 Mb
PubMed search
- Wikidata
View/Edit Human	View/Edit Mouse

The glycine receptor, alpha 4, also known as GLRA4, is a human pseudogene. The protein encoded by this gene is a subunit of the glycine receptor.
