= Glycine receptor =

Widely distributed inhibitory receptor in the central nervous system

Glycine

The glycine receptor (abbreviated as GlyR or GLR) is the receptor of the amino acid neurotransmitter glycine. GlyR is an ionotropic receptor that produces its effects through chloride currents. It is one of the most widely distributed inhibitory receptors in the central nervous system and has important roles in a variety of physiological processes, especially in mediating inhibitory neurotransmission in the spinal cord and brainstem.

The receptor can be activated by a range of simple amino acids including glycine, β-alanine and taurine, and can be selectively blocked by the high-affinity competitive antagonist strychnine. Caffeine is a competitive antagonist of GlyR. Cannabinoids enhance the function.

The protein Gephyrin has been shown to be necessary for GlyR clustering at inhibitory synapses. GlyR is known to colocalize with the GABA_{A} receptor on some hippocampal neurons. Nevertheless, some exceptions can occur in the central nervous system where the GlyR α1 subunit and gephyrin, its anchoring protein, are not found in dorsal root ganglion neurons despite the presence of GABA_{A} receptors.

== History ==
Glycine and its receptor were first suggested to play a role in inhibition of cells in 1965. Two years later, experiments showed that glycine had a hyperpolarizing effect on spinal motor neurons due to increased chloride conductance through the receptor. Then, in 1971, glycine was found to be localized in the spinal cord using autoradiography. All of these discoveries resulted in the conclusion that glycine is a primary inhibitory neurotransmitter of the spinal cord that works via its receptor.

== Arrangement of subunits ==
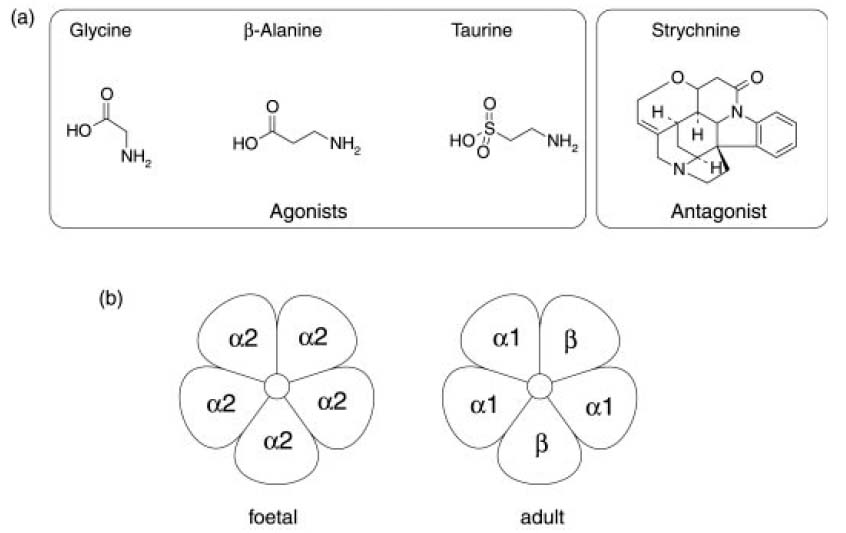
(a): shows three agonists and one antagonist of the glycine receptor. (b): the fetal form of the receptor is made up of five α2 subunits, while the adult form is made up of both α1 and β subunits.

Strychnine-sensitive GlyRs are members of a family of ligand-gated ion channels. Receptors of this family are arranged as five subunits surrounding a central pore, with each subunit composed of four α helical transmembrane segments. There are presently four known isoforms of the ligand-binding α-subunit (α_{1-4}) of GlyR (GLRA1, GLRA2, GLRA3, GLRA4) and a single β-subunit (GLRB). The adult form of the GlyR is the heteromeric α_{1}β receptor, which is believed to have a stoichiometry (proportion) of three α_{1} subunits and two β subunits or four α_{1} subunits and one β subunit. The embryo form on the other hand, is made up of five α2 subunits. The α-subunits are also able to form functional homopentamers in heterologous expression systems in African clawed frog oocytes or mammalian cell lines, which are useful for studies of channel pharmacokinetics and pharmacodynamics. The β subunit is unable to form functional channels without α subunits but determines the synaptic localization of GlyRs and the pharmacological profile of glycinergic currents.

== Function ==
=== Adults ===
In mature adults, glycine is an inhibitory neurotransmitter found in the spinal cord and regions of the brain. As it binds to a glycine receptor, a conformational change is induced, and the channel created by the receptor opens. As the channel opens, chloride ions are able to flow into the cell which results in hyperpolarization. In addition to this hyperpolarization, which decreases the likelihood of action potential propagation, glycine is also responsible for decreasing the release of both inhibitory and excitatory neurotransmitters as it binds to its receptor. This is called the "shunting" effect and can be explained by Ohm's law. As the receptor is activated, the membrane conductance is increased and the membrane resistance is decreased. According to Ohm's law, as resistance decreases, so does voltage. A decreased postsynaptic voltage results in a decreased release of neurotransmitters.

=== Embryos ===
In developing embryos, glycine has the opposite effect as it does in adults. It is an excitatory neurotransmitter. This is because chloride has a more positive equilibrium potential in early stages of life due to the high expression of NKCC1. This moves one sodium, one potassium and two chloride ions into the cell, resulting in a higher intracellular chloride concentration. When glycine binds to its receptor, the result is an efflux of chloride, instead of an influx as it happens in mature adults. The efflux of chloride causes the membrane potential to become more positive, or depolarized. As the cells mature, the K+-Cl- cotransporter 2 (KCC2) is expressed, which moves potassium and chloride out of the cell, decreasing the intracellular chloride concentration. This allows the receptor to switch to an inhibitory mechanism as described above for adults.

== Glycine receptors in diseases ==
Disruption of GlyR surface expression or reduced ability of expressed GlyRs to conduct chloride ions results in the rare neurological disorder, hyperekplexia. The disorder is characterized by an exaggerated response to unexpected stimuli which is followed by a temporary but complete muscular rigidity often resulting in an unprotected fall. Chronic injuries as a result of the falls are symptomatic of the disorder. A mutation in GLRA1 is responsible for some cases of stiff person syndrome.

== Ligands ==
=== Agonists ===
- β-Alanine
- D-Alanine
- Gelsemine
- Glycine
- Hypotaurine
- Ivermectin
- L-Alanine
- L-Proline
- L-Serine
- Milacemide
- Quisqualamine
- Sarcosine
- Taurine
- THC
- L-Theanine

=== Positive Allosteric Modulators ===
- Ethanol
- Toluene
- Zonisamide

=== Antagonists ===
- Bicuculline
- Brucine
- Caffeine
- Levorphanol
- Picrotoxin
- Strychnine
- Tutin
- Quercetin
- Tranexamic acid
