= Sodium- and chloride-dependent glycine transporter 2 =

Protein-coding gene in the species Homo sapiens

SLC6A5

Identifiers
- Aliases: SLC6A5, GLYT-2, GLYT2, HKPX3, NET1, Glycine transporter 2, solute carrier family 6 member 5
- External IDs: OMIM: 604159; MGI: 105090; GeneCards: SLC6A5

Gene location (Human)
Chr.	Chromosome 11 (human)
Band	11p15.1	Start	20,599,594 bp
Band	11p15.1	End	20,659,285 bp

Gene location (Mouse)
Chr.	Chromosome 7 (mouse)
Band	7|7 B4	Start	49,559,894 bp
Band	7|7 B4	End	49,613,604 bp
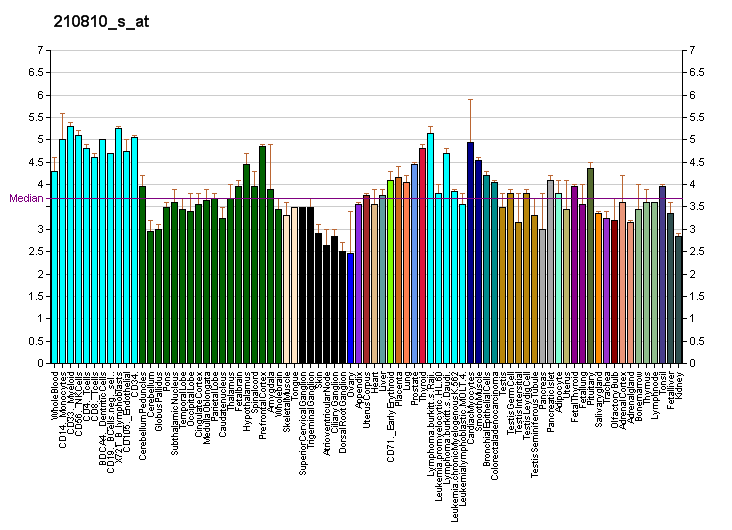
RNA expression pattern
Bgee	Human / Mouse (ortholog); Top expressed in: secondary oocyte; testicle; superior vestibular nucleus; metencephalon; cerebellum; spinal cord; cerebellar cortex; cerebellar hemisphere; right hemisphere of cerebellum; left testis / Top expressed in: medial vestibular nucleus; pontine nuclei; spinal cord; Gray matter of spinal cord; anterior horn of spinal cord; deep cerebellar nuclei; lumbar subsegment of spinal cord; posterior horn of spinal cord; gray matter layer of cerebellum; neural layer of retina; More reference expression data
BioGPS	More reference expression data
Gene ontology
Molecular function	neurotransmitter:sodium symporter activity; symporter activity; glycine:sodium symporter activity; metal ion binding; glycine transmembrane transporter activity
Cellular component	integral component of membrane; plasma membrane; integral component of plasma membrane; membrane; glycinergic synapse; integral component of presynaptic membrane
Biological process	synaptic transmission, glycinergic; neurotransmitter transport; chemical synaptic transmission; glycine transport; glycine import across plasma membrane
Sources:Amigo / QuickGO
Orthologs
Databases	NCBI: entry; OMA: entry
Species	Human	Mouse
Entrez	9152	104245
Ensembl	ENSG00000165970	ENSMUSG00000039728
UniProt	Q9Y345	Q761V0
RefSeq (mRNA)	NM_004211; NM_001318369	NM_001146013; NM_148931
RefSeq (protein)	NP_001305298; NP_004202	n/a
Location (UCSC)	Chr 11: 20.6 – 20.66 Mb	Chr 7: 49.56 – 49.61 Mb
PubMed search
- Wikidata
View/Edit Human	View/Edit Mouse

Sodium- and chloride-dependent glycine transporter 2, also known as glycine transporter 2 (GlyT2), is a protein that in humans is encoded by the SLC6A5 gene.

The glycine transporter 2 is a membrane protein which recaptures glycine, a major inhibitory transmitter in the spinal cord and brainstem. GlyT2 is a specific marker of glycinergic neurons and a member of the Na^{+} and Cl^{−}-coupled transporter family SLC6. Glycine uptake mediated by GlyT2 is electrogenic, coupled to three Na^{+} and one Cl^{−} (i.e. two positive charges per glycine). In humans, GlyT2 is encoded by the SLC6A5 gene. Inactivation of GlyT2 in knockout mice is lethal during the second post-natal week as the absence of GlyT2 disrupts inhibitory transmission by reducing glycine release. Mutations in SLC6A5 gene are responsible for a presynaptic form of hyperekplexia, a genetic disease causing increased startle reflex. GlyT2 main physiological role is to recapture glycine released in the synaptic cleft and to maintain high glycine concentration in the presynaptic neuron. Therefore, chronic inhibition of GlyT2 will deplete intracellular storage of glycine and limit its accumulation in synaptic vesicles.

== Inhibitors ==
- Amoxapine
- Ethanol
- N-Arachidonylglycine (NAGly)
- Opiranserin (VVZ-149)
- ORG-25543
- VVZ-368

== See also ==
- Sodium:neurotransmitter symporter
- Solute carrier family
