= Glutamate decarboxylase =

Enzyme

glutamate decarboxylase

Identifiers
- EC no.: 4.1.1.15
- CAS no.: 9024-58-2m

Databases
- BRENDA: enzyme data
- ExPASy: NiceZyme view
- KEGG: enzyme entry
- MetaCyc: metabolic pathway
- Rhea: reactions
- PDB structures: RCSB PDB PDBe PDBsum
- Gene Ontology: AmiGO / QuickGO
Search
- PMC: articles
- PubMed: articles
- NCBI: proteins

Glutamic acid decarboxylase 1
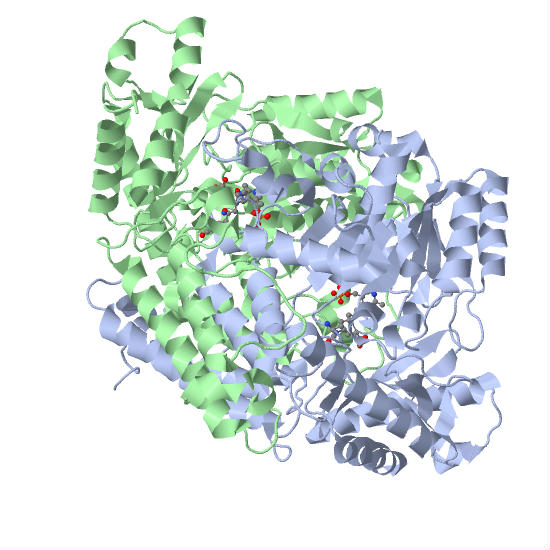
- GAD67 derived from PDB: 2okj

Identifiers
- Symbol: GAD1
- Alt. symbols: glutamate decarboxylase 1 (brain, 67kD); GAD67
- NCBI gene: 2571
- HGNC: 4092
- OMIM: 605363
- RefSeq: NM_000817
- UniProt: Q99259

Other data
- EC number: 4.1.1.15
- Locus: Chr. 2 q31
Search for
- Structures: Swiss-model
- Domains: InterPro

glutamic acid decarboxylase 2

Identifiers
- Symbol: GAD2
- Alt. symbols: GAD65
- NCBI gene: 2572
- HGNC: 11284
- OMIM: 4093
- RefSeq: NM_001047
- UniProt: Q05329

Other data
- EC number: 4.1.1.15
- Locus: Chr. 10 p11.23
Search for
- Structures: Swiss-model
- Domains: InterPro

Glutamate decarboxylase or glutamic acid decarboxylase (GAD) is an enzyme that catalyzes the decarboxylation of glutamate to gamma-aminobutyric acid (GABA) and carbon dioxide (CO_{2}). GAD uses pyridoxal-phosphate (PLP) as a cofactor. The reaction proceeds as follows:

HOOC−CH_{2}−CH_{2}−CH(NH_{2})−COOH → CO_{2} + HOOC−CH_{2}−CH_{2}−CH_{2}NH_{2}

In mammals, GAD exists in two isoforms with molecular weights of 67 and 65 kDa (GAD_{67} and GAD_{65}), which are encoded by two different genes on different chromosomes (GAD1 and GAD2 genes, chromosomes 2 and 10 in humans, respectively). GAD_{67} and GAD_{65} are expressed in the brain where GABA is used as a neurotransmitter, and they are also expressed in the insulin-producing β-cells of the pancreas, in varying ratios depending upon the species. Together, these two enzymes maintain the major physiological supply of GABA in mammals, though it may also be synthesized from putrescine in the enteric nervous system, brain, and elsewhere by the actions of diamine oxidase and aldehyde dehydrogenase 1a1.

Several truncated transcripts and polypeptides of GAD_{67} are detectable in the developing brain, however their function, if any, is unknown.

== Structure and mechanism ==
Both isoforms of GAD are homodimeric structures, consisting of three primary domains: the PLP, C-terminal and N-terminal domains. The PLP-binding domain of this enzyme adopts a type I PLP-dependent transferase-like fold. The reaction proceeds via the canonical mechanism, involving Schiff base linkage between PLP and Lys405. PLP is held in place through base-stacking with an adjacent histidine residue, and GABA is positioned such that its carboxyl group forms a salt bridge with arginine and a hydrogen bond with glutamine.

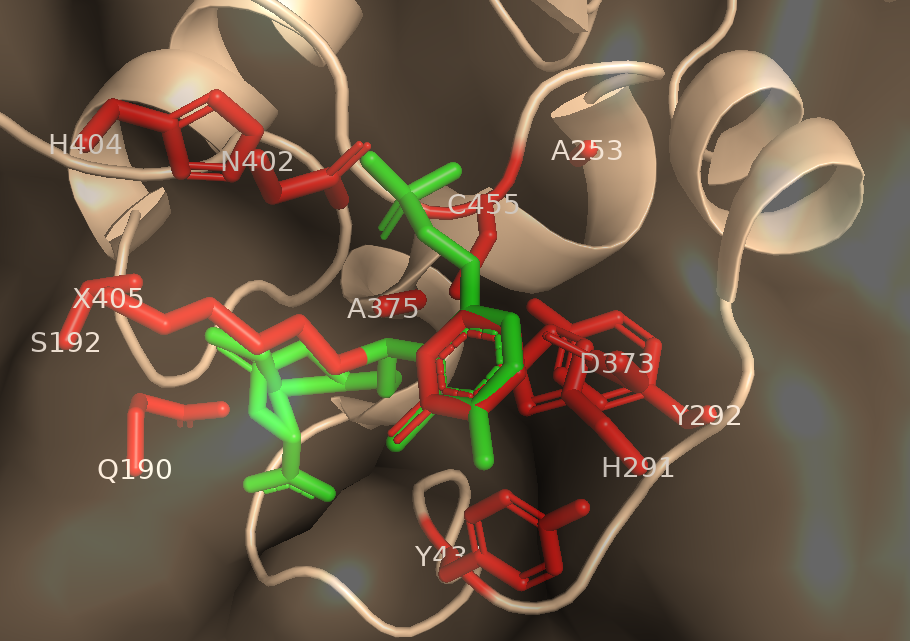
GAD67 active site containing PLP-glutamate complex (shown in green), with Schiff base linkage at Lys405. Side chain residues shown in red.

Dimerization is essential to maintaining function as the active site is found at this interface, and mutations interfering with optimal association between the 2 chains has been linked to pathology, such as schizophrenia. Interference of dimerization by GAD inhibitors such as 2-keto-4-pentenoic acid (KPA) and ethyl ketopentenoate (EKP) were also shown to lead to dramatic reductions in GABA production and incidence of seizures.

Catalytic activity is mediated by a short flexible loop at the dimer interface (residues 432–442 in GAD67, and 423–433 in GAD65). In GAD67 this loop remains tethered, covering the active site and providing a catalytic environment to sustain GABA production; its mobility in GAD65 promotes a side reaction that results in release of PLP, leading to autoinactivation. The conformation of this loop is intimately linked to the C-terminal domain, which also affects the rate of autoinactivation. Moreover, GABA-bound GAD65 is intrinsically more flexible and exists as an ensemble of states, thus providing more opportunities for autoantigenicity as seen in Type 1 diabetes. GAD derived from Escherichia coli shows additional structural intricacies, including a pH-dependent conformational change. This behavior is defined by the presence of a triple helical bundle formed by the N-termini of the hexameric protein in acidic environments.

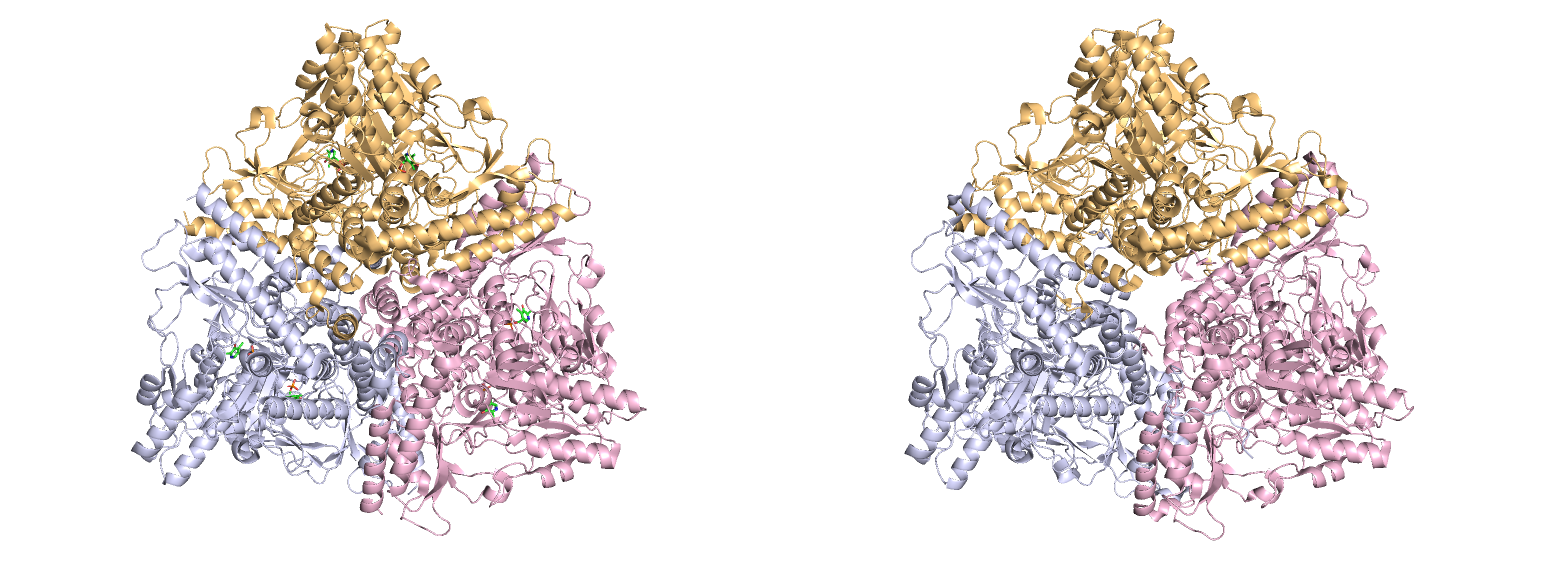
Hexameric E. coli GAD conformational transition: low-pH (left), neutral pH (right).

== Regulation of GAD65 and GAD67 ==
Despite an extensive sequence similarity between the two genes, GAD65 and GAD67 fulfill very different roles within the human body. Additionally, research suggests that GAD65 and GAD67 are regulated by distinctly different cellular mechanisms.

GAD_{65} and GAD_{67} synthesize GABA at different locations in the cell, at different developmental times, and for functionally different purposes. GAD_{67} is spread evenly throughout the cell while GAD_{65} is localized to nerve terminals. GAD_{67} synthesizes GABA for neuron activity unrelated to neurotransmission, such as synaptogenesis and protection from neural injury. This function requires widespread, ubiquitous presence of GABA. GAD_{65}, however, synthesizes GABA for neurotransmission, and therefore is only necessary at nerve terminals and synapses. In order to aid in neurotransmission, GAD_{65} forms a complex with heat shock cognate 70 (HSC_{70}), cysteine string protein (CSP) and vesicular GABA transporter VGAT, which, as a complex, helps package GABA into vesicles for release during neurotransmission. GAD_{67} is transcribed during early development, while GAD_{65} is not transcribed until later in life. This developmental difference in GAD_{67} and GAD_{65} reflects the functional properties of each isoform; GAD_{67} is needed throughout development for normal cellular functioning, while GAD_{65} is not needed until slightly later in development when synaptic inhibition is more prevalent.

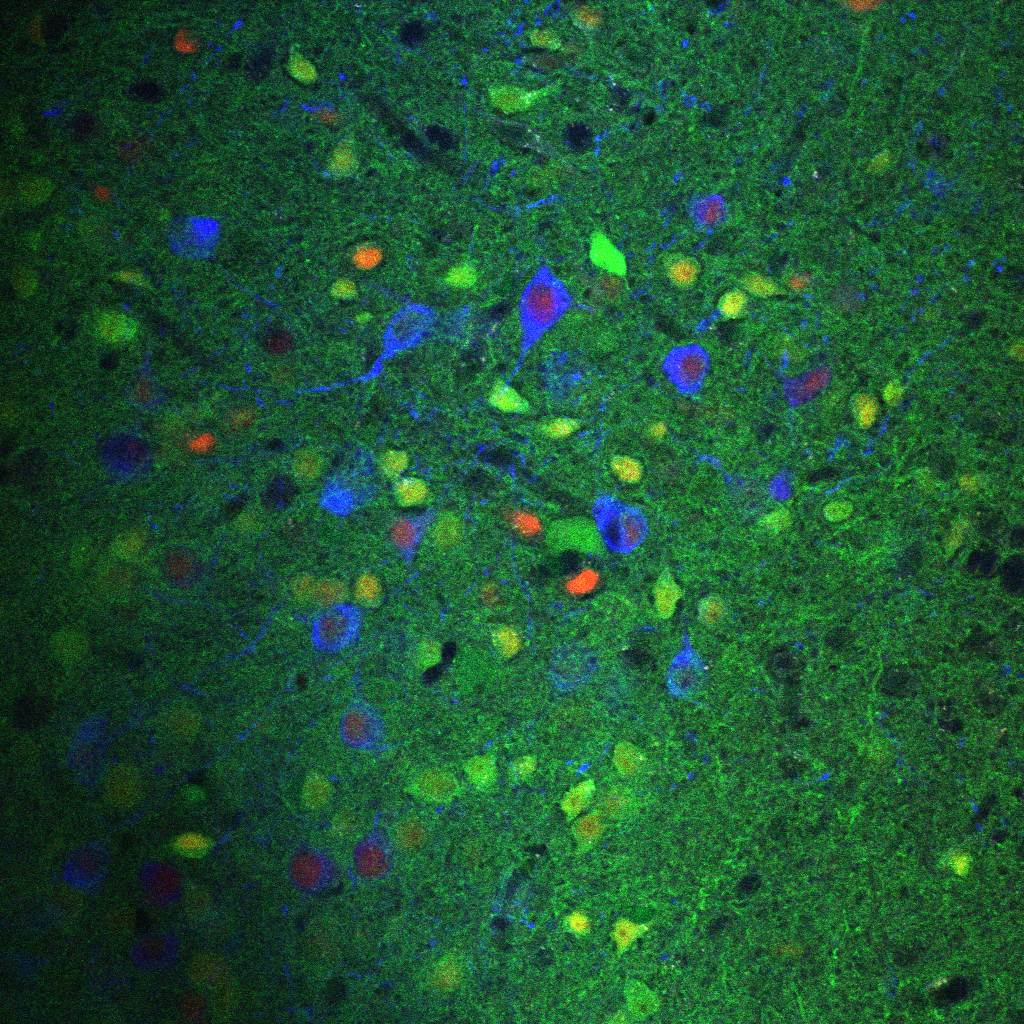
Gad65 in red, Gad67 in green, and tyrosine hydroxylase (blue) in the ventral tegmental area of the mouse brain

GAD_{67} and GAD_{65} are also regulated differently post-translationally. Both GAD_{65} and GAD_{67} are regulated via phosphorylation of a dynamic catalytic loop, but the regulation of these isoforms differs; GAD_{65} is activated by phosphorylation while GAD_{67} is inhibited by phosphorylation. GAD67 is predominantly found activated (~92%), whereas GAD65 is predominantly found inactivated (~72%). GAD_{67} is phosphorylated at threonine 91 by protein kinase A (PKA), while GAD_{65} is phosphorylated, and therefore regulated by, protein kinase C (PKC). Both GAD_{67} and GAD_{65} are also regulated post-translationally by pyridoxal 5'-phosphate (PLP); GAD is activated when bound to PLP and inactive when not bound to PLP. Majority of GAD_{67} is bound to PLP at any given time, whereas GAD_{65} binds PLP when GABA is needed for neurotransmission. This reflects the functional properties of the two isoforms; GAD_{67} must be active at all times for normal cellular functioning, and is therefore constantly activated by PLP, while GAD_{65} must only be activated when GABA neurotransmission occurs, and is therefore regulated according to the synaptic environment.

Studies with mice also show functional differences between Gad67 and Gad65. GAD67−/− mice are born with cleft palate and die within a day after birth while GAD65−/− mice survive with a slightly increased tendency in seizures. Additionally, GAD65± have symptoms defined similarly to attention deficit hyperactivity disorder (ADHD) in humans.

== Role in the nervous system ==
Both GAD67 and GAD65 are present in all types of synapses within the human nervous system. This includes dendrodendritic, axosomatic, and axodendritic synapses. Preliminary evidence suggests that GAD65 is dominant in the visual and neuroendocrine systems, which undergo more phasic changes. It is also believed that GAD67 is present at higher amounts in tonically active neurons.

== Role in pathology ==
=== Autism ===
Both GAD65 and GAD67 experience significant downregulation in cases of autism. In a comparison of autistic versus control brains, GAD65 and GAD67 experienced a downregulation average of 50% in parietal and cerebellar cortices of autistic brains. Cerebellar Purkinje cells also reported a 40% downregulation, suggesting that affected cerebellar nuclei may disrupt output to higher order motor and cognitive areas of the brain.

=== Diabetes ===
Both GAD_{67} and GAD_{65} are targets of autoantibodies in people who later develop type 1 diabetes mellitus or latent autoimmune diabetes. Injections with GAD_{65} in ways that induce immune tolerance have been shown to prevent type 1 diabetes in rodent models. In clinical trials, injections with GAD_{65} have been shown to preserve some insulin production for 30 months in humans with type 1 diabetes. A Cochrane systematic review also examined 1 study showing improvement of C-peptide levels in cases of Latent Autoimmune Diabetes in adults, 5 years following treatment with GAD_{65}. Still, it is important to highlight that the studies available to be included in this review presented considerable flaws in quality and design.

=== Stiff person syndrome ===
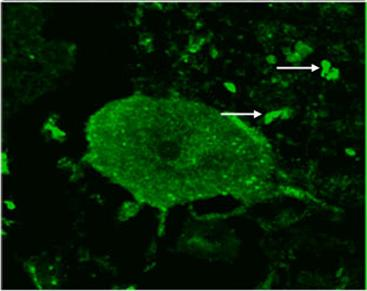
Healthy human cerebellum stained with a reference anti-GAD65 monoclonal antibody. Thin arrows show presynaptic terminals staining with the anti-GAD65 monoclonal antibody

High titers of autoantibodies to glutamic acid decarboxylase (GAD) are well documented in association with stiff person syndrome (SPS). Glutamic acid decarboxylase is the rate-limiting enzyme in the synthesis of γ-aminobutyric acid (GABA), and impaired function of GABAergic neurons has been implicated in the pathogenesis of SPS. Autoantibodies to GAD might be the causative agent or a disease marker.

=== Schizophrenia and bipolar disorder ===
Substantial dysregulation of GAD mRNA expression, coupled with downregulation of reelin, is observed in schizophrenia and bipolar disorder. The most pronounced downregulation of GAD_{67} was found in hippocampal stratum oriens layer in both disorders and in other layers and structures of hippocampus with varying degrees.

GAD_{67} is a key enzyme involved in the synthesis of inhibitory neurotransmitter GABA and people with schizophrenia have been shown to express lower amounts of GAD_{67} in the dorsolateral prefrontal cortex compared to healthy controls. The mechanism underlying the decreased levels of GAD_{67} in people with schizophrenia remains unclear. Some have proposed that an immediate early gene, Zif268, which normally binds to the promoter region of GAD_{67} and increases transcription of GAD_{67}, is lower in schizophrenic patients, thus contributing to decreased levels of GAD_{67}. Since the dorsolateral prefrontal cortex (DLPFC) is involved in working memory, and GAD_{67} and Zif268 mRNA levels are lower in the DLPFC of schizophrenic patients, this molecular alteration may account, at least in part, for the working memory impairments associated with the disease.

=== Parkinson disease ===
The bilateral delivery of glutamic acid decarboxylase (GAD) by an adeno-associated viral vector into the subthalamic nucleus of patients between 30 and 75 years of age with advanced, progressive, levodopa-responsive Parkinson disease resulted in significant improvement over baseline during the course of a six-month study.

=== Cerebellar disorders ===
Intracerebellar administration of GAD autoantibodies to animals increases the excitability of motoneurons and impairs the production of nitric oxide (NO), a molecule involved in learning. Epitope recognition contributes to cerebellar involvement. Reduced GABA levels increase glutamate levels as a consequence of lower inhibition of subtypes of GABA receptors. Higher glutamate levels activate microglia and activation of xc(−) increases the extracellular glutamate release.

=== Neuropathic pain ===
Peripheral nerve injury of the sciatic nerve (a neuropathic pain model) induces a transient loss of GAD_{65} immunoreactive terminals in the spinal cord dorsal horn and suggests a potential involvement for these alterations in the development and amelioration of pain behaviour.

== Other anti-gad-associated neurologic disorders ==
Antibodies directed against glutamic acid decarboxylase (GAD) are increasingly found in patients with other symptoms indicative of central nervous system (CNS) dysfunction, such as ataxia, progressive encephalomyelitis with rigidity and myoclonus (PERM), limbic encephalitis, and epilepsy. The pattern of anti-GAD antibodies in epilepsy differs from type 1 diabetes and stiff-person syndrome.

== Role of glutamate decarboxylase in other organisms ==
Besides the synthesis of GABA, GAD has additional functions and structural variations that are organism-dependent. In Saccharomyces cerevisiae, GAD binds the Ca^{2+} regulatory protein calmodulin (CaM) and is also involved in responding to oxidative stress. Similarly, GAD in plants binds calmodulin as well. This interaction occurs at the 30-50bp CAM-binding domain (CaMBD) in its C terminus and is necessary for proper regulation of GABA production. Unlike vertebrates and invertebrates, the GABA produced by GAD is used in plants to signal abiotic stress by controlling levels of intracellular Ca^{2+} via CaM. Binding to CaM opens Ca^{2+} channels and leads to an increase in Ca^{2+} concentrations in the cytosol, allowing Ca^{2+} to act as a secondary messenger and activate downstream pathways. When GAD is not bound to CaM, the CaMBD acts as an autoinhibitory domain, thus deactivating GAD in the absence of stress. Interesting, in two plant species, rice and apples, Ca2+ /CAM-independent GAD isoforms have been discovered. The C-terminus of these isoforms contain substitutions at key residues necessary to interact with CaM in the CaMBD, preventing the protein from binding to GAD. Whereas CaMBD of the isoform in rice still functions as an autoinhibitory domain, the C-terminus in the isoform in apples does not. Finally, the structure of plant GAD is a hexamer and has pH-dependent activity, with the optimal pH of 5.8 in multiple species. but also significant activity at pH 7.3 in the presence of CaM.

It is also believed that the control of glutamate decarboxylase has the prospect of improving citrus produce quality post-harvest. In Citrus plants, research has shown that glutamate decarboxylase plays a key role in citrate metabolism. With the increase of glutamate decarboxylase via direct exposure, citrate levels have been seen to significantly increase within plants, and in conjunction post-harvest quality maintenance was significantly improved, and rot rates decreased.

Just like GAD in plants, GAD in E. coli has a hexamer structure and is more active under acidic pH; the pH optimum for E. coli GAD is 3.8-4.6. However, unlike plants and yeast, GAD in E. coli does not require calmodulin binding to function. There are also two isoforms of GAD, namely GadA and GadB, encoded by separate genes in E. coli, although both isoforms are biochemically identical. The enzyme plays a major role in conferring acid resistance and allows bacteria to temporarily survive in highly acidic environments (pH < 2.5) like the stomach. This is done by GAD decarboxylating glutamate to GABA, which requires H+ to be uptaken as a reactant and raises the pH inside the bacteria. GABA can then be exported out of E. coli cells and contribute to increasing the pH of the nearby extracellular environments.
