= GLRA2 =

Protein-coding gene in the species Homo sapiens

Identifiers
- Aliases: GLRA2, GLR, glycine receptor alpha 2, MRXSP
- External IDs: OMIM: 305990; MGI: 95748; GeneCards: GLRA2

Gene location (Human)
| Chr. | X chromosome (human) |
| Band | Xp22.2 | Start | 14,529,298 bp |
| Band | Xp22.2 | End | 14,731,812 bp |

Gene location (Mouse)
| Chr. | X chromosome (mouse) |
| Band | X F5|X 76.75 cM | Start | 163,912,013 bp |
| Band | X F5|X 76.75 cM | End | 164,110,389 bp |
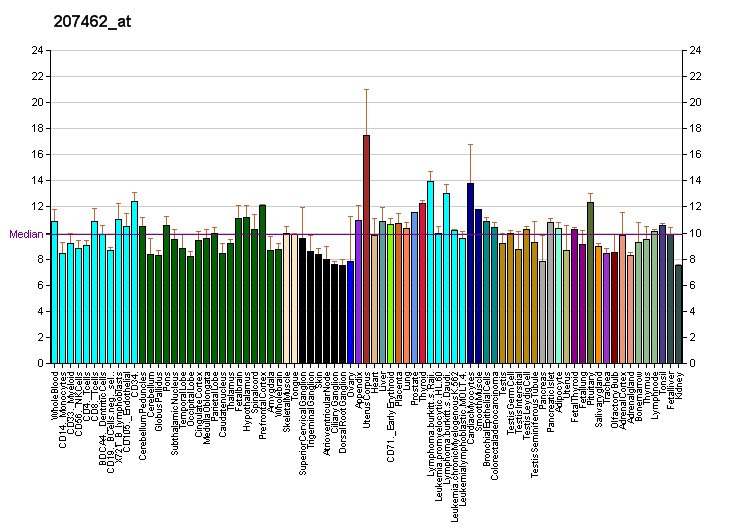
RNA expression pattern
| Bgee | Human / Mouse (ortholog); Top expressed in: testicle; ganglionic eminence; cerebellar hemisphere; right hemisphere of cerebellum; hypothalamus; prefrontal cortex; ventricular zone; rectum; cingulate gyrus; anterior cingulate cortex / Top expressed in: lumbar subsegment of spinal cord; ventral tegmental area; lateral hypothalamus; lateral septal nucleus; anterior amygdaloid area; paraventricular nucleus of hypothalamus; nucleus of stria terminalis; nucleus accumbens; substantia nigra; dorsomedial hypothalamic nucleus; More reference expression data |
| BioGPS | More reference expression data |
Gene ontology
| Molecular function | metal ion binding; glycine binding; transmitter-gated ion channel activity; chloride channel activity; glycine-gated chloride ion channel activity; extracellularly glycine-gated chloride channel activity; extracellular ligand-gated ion channel activity; ion channel activity; transmembrane signaling receptor activity; transmitter-gated ion channel activity involved in regulation of postsynaptic membrane potential |
| Cellular component | synapse; integral component of membrane; cell projection; cell junction; integral component of plasma membrane; postsynaptic membrane; membrane; chloride channel complex; plasma membrane; neuron projection; glycinergic synapse |
| Biological process | neuropeptide signaling pathway; chloride transmembrane transport; chloride transport; ion transport; cellular response to amino acid stimulus; synaptic transmission, glycinergic; cellular response to ethanol; cellular response to zinc ion; excitatory postsynaptic potential; ion transmembrane transport; signal transduction; chemical synaptic transmission; regulation of membrane potential; response to amino acid; nervous system process; regulation of postsynaptic membrane potential |
Sources:Amigo / QuickGO
Orthologs
| Databases | NCBI: entry; OMA: entry |
| Species | Human | Mouse |
| Entrez | 2742 | 237213 |
| Ensembl | ENSG00000101958 | ENSMUSG00000018589 |
| UniProt | P23416 | Q7TNC8 |
| RefSeq (mRNA) | NM_001118885; NM_001118886; NM_001171942; NM_002063 | NM_183427; NM_001357099; NM_001357100 |
| RefSeq (protein) | NP_001112357; NP_001112358; NP_001165413; NP_002054 | NP_906272; NP_001344028; NP_001344029 |
| Location (UCSC) | Chr X: 14.53 – 14.73 Mb | Chr X: 163.91 – 164.11 Mb |
| PubMed search |
- Wikidata
| View/Edit Human | View/Edit Mouse |

Glycine receptor subunit alpha-2 is a protein that in humans is encoded by the GLRA2 gene.

== See also ==
- Glycine receptor
