= Molybdopterin molybdotransferase =

Identifiers
- EC no.: 2.10.1.1

Databases
- IntEnz: IntEnz view
- BRENDA: BRENDA entry
- ExPASy: NiceZyme view
- KEGG: KEGG entry
- MetaCyc: metabolic pathway
- PRIAM: profile
- PDB structures: RCSB PDB PDBe PDBsum
Search
- PMC: articles
- PubMed: articles
- NCBI: proteins

Molybdopterin molybdotransferase (EC 2.10.1.1, MoeA, Cnx1) is an enzyme with systematic name adenylyl-molybdopterin:molybdate molybdate transferase (AMP-forming). This enzyme catalyses the following chemical reaction

adenylyl-molybdopterin + molybdate $\rightleftharpoons$ molybdenum cofactor + AMP

Catalyses the insertion of molybdenum into the ene-dithiol group of molybdopterin.
