= Molybdopterin adenylyltransferase =

Identifiers
- EC no.: 2.7.7.75

Databases
- IntEnz: IntEnz view
- BRENDA: BRENDA entry
- ExPASy: NiceZyme view
- KEGG: KEGG entry
- MetaCyc: metabolic pathway
- PRIAM: profile
- PDB structures: RCSB PDB PDBe PDBsum
Search
- PMC: articles
- PubMed: articles
- NCBI: proteins

Molybdopterin adenylyltransferase (EC 2.7.7.75, MogA, Cnx1) is an enzyme with systematic name ATP:molybdopterin adenylyltransferase. This enzyme catalyses the following chemical reaction

ATP + molybdopterin $\rightleftharpoons$ diphosphate + adenylyl-molybdopterin

This enzyme catalyses the activation of molybdopterin for molybdenum insertion.
