= GLRB =

Protein-coding gene in the species Homo sapiens

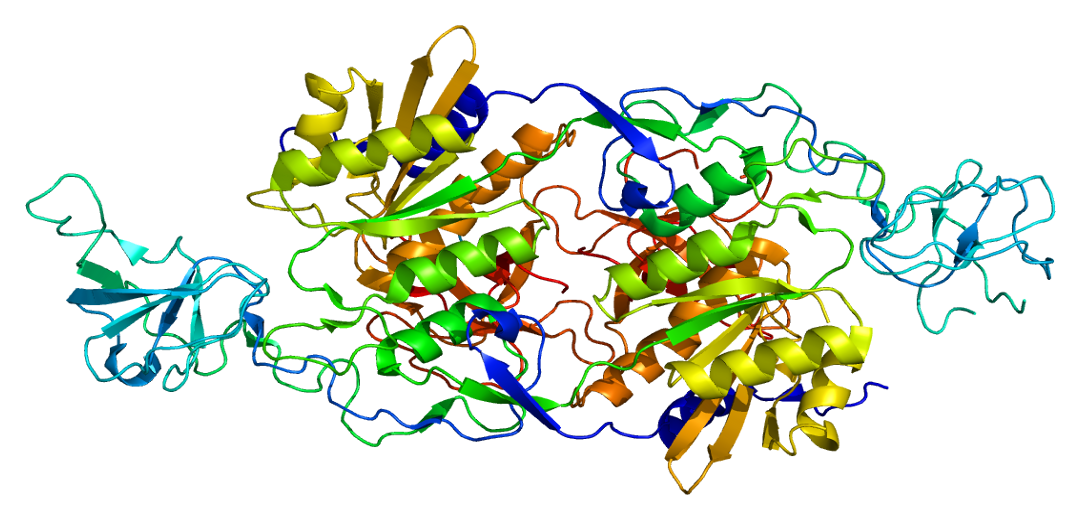

Identifiers
- Aliases: GLRB, HKPX2, glycine receptor beta
- External IDs: OMIM: 138492; MGI: 95751; GeneCards: GLRB

Gene location (Human)
Chr.	Chromosome 4 (human)
Band	4q32.1	Start	157,076,125 bp
Band	4q32.1	End	157,172,090 bp

Gene location (Mouse)
Chr.	Chromosome 3 (mouse)
Band	3 E3|3 35.71 cM	Start	80,750,906 bp
Band	3 E3|3 35.71 cM	End	80,820,967 bp
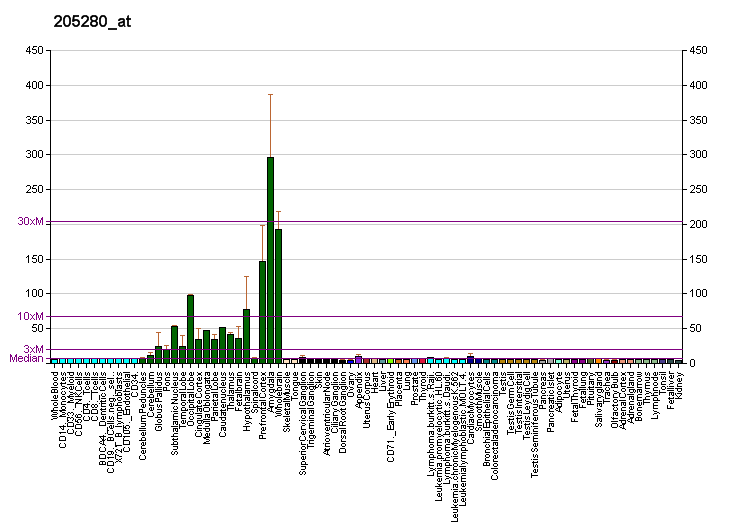

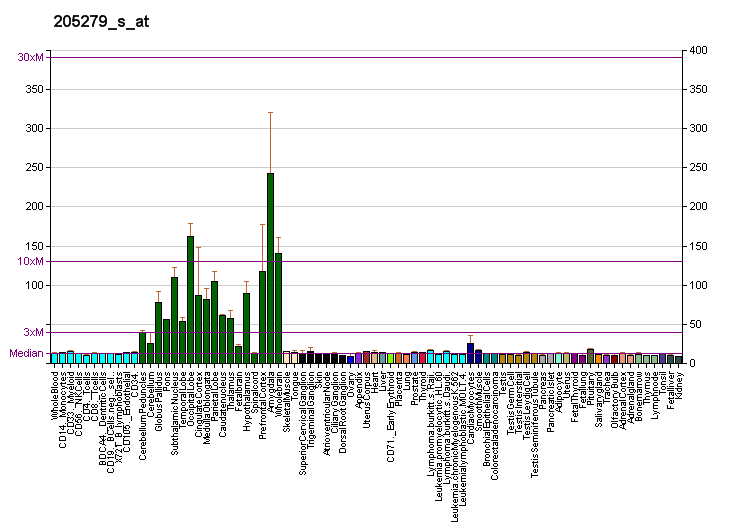
RNA expression pattern
Bgee	Human / Mouse (ortholog); Top expressed in: frontal pole; Brodmann area 10; middle frontal gyrus; lateral nuclear group of thalamus; pons; paraflocculus of cerebellum; Brodmann area 23; dorsolateral prefrontal cortex; endothelial cell; primary visual cortex / Top expressed in: lateral geniculate nucleus; mammillary body; pontine nuclei; medial vestibular nucleus; deep cerebellar nuclei; lobe of cerebellum; lateral hypothalamus; dorsal tegmental nucleus; cerebellar vermis; lateral septal nucleus; More reference expression data
BioGPS	More reference expression data
Gene ontology
Molecular function	glycine binding; protein binding; extracellularly glycine-gated ion channel activity; chloride channel activity; extracellular ligand-gated ion channel activity; extracellularly glycine-gated chloride channel activity; ion channel activity; transmembrane signaling receptor activity; transmitter-gated ion channel activity involved in regulation of postsynaptic membrane potential
Cellular component	cytoplasm; integral component of membrane; postsynaptic membrane; cell projection; membrane; synapse; chloride channel complex; glycine-gated chloride channel complex; cell junction; dendrite; integral component of plasma membrane; plasma membrane; GABA-ergic synapse; glycinergic synapse; neuron projection
Biological process	response to amino acid; startle response; protein heterooligomerization; regulation of membrane potential; gamma-aminobutyric acid receptor clustering; chloride transmembrane transport; nervous system development; acrosome reaction; neuromuscular process; righting reflex; chloride transport; neuropeptide signaling pathway; visual perception; adult walking behavior; ion transport; synaptic transmission, glycinergic; excitatory postsynaptic potential; chemical synaptic transmission; ion transmembrane transport; signal transduction; nervous system process; regulation of postsynaptic membrane potential
Sources:Amigo / QuickGO
Orthologs
Databases	NCBI: entry; OMA: entry
Species	Human	Mouse
Entrez	2743	14658
Ensembl	ENSG00000109738	ENSMUSG00000028020
UniProt	P48167	P48168
RefSeq (mRNA)	NM_000824; NM_001166060; NM_001166061	NM_001281969; NM_010298; NM_001345955; NM_001345956; NM_001345957 NM_001345958; NM_001345959; NM_001345996
RefSeq (protein)	NP_000815; NP_001159532; NP_001159533	NP_001268898; NP_001332884; NP_001332885; NP_001332886; NP_001332887 NP_001332888; NP_001332925; NP_034428
Location (UCSC)	Chr 4: 157.08 – 157.17 Mb	Chr 3: 80.75 – 80.82 Mb
PubMed search
- Wikidata
View/Edit Human	View/Edit Mouse

Glycine receptor subunit beta is a protein that in humans is encoded by the GLRB gene.

The inhibitory glycine receptor mediates postsynaptic inhibition in the spinal cord and other regions of the central nervous system. It is a pentameric receptor composed of alpha (GLRA1, MIM 138491; GLRA2, MIM 305990) and beta subunits.[supplied by OMIM]

== See also ==
- Glycine receptor
