= Stiff-person syndrome =

Neurological disorder

Stiff-person disease
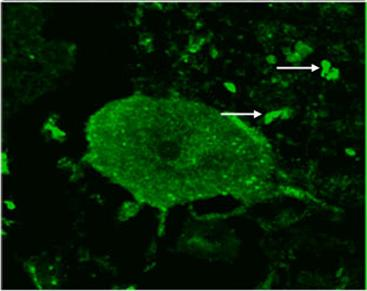
- Photomicrograph of cerebellum with bound anti-GAD65 monoclonal antibodies (green), indirect immunofluorescence
- Specialty: Neurology
- Symptoms: muscular rigidity and trigger-induced painful muscle spasms
- Frequency: 1 in 1,000,000

Stiff-person syndrome (SPS), also known as stiff-man syndrome, is a rare neurological disorder of unclear cause characterized by progressive muscular rigidity and stiffness. The stiffness primarily affects the truncal muscles and is characterised by spasms, resulting in postural deformities. Chronic pain, impaired mobility, and lumbar hyperlordosis are common symptoms.

SPS occurs in about one in a million people and is most commonly found in middle-aged people. A small minority of patients have the paraneoplastic variety of the condition. Variants of the condition, such as stiff-limb syndrome, which primarily affects a specific limb, are often seen.

SPS was first described in 1956. Diagnostic criteria were proposed in the 1960s and refined two decades later. In the 1990s and 2000s, the role of antibodies in the condition became clearer. SPS patients generally have glutamic acid decarboxylase (GAD) antibodies, which seldom occur in the general population. In addition to blood tests for GAD, electromyography tests can help confirm the condition's presence.

Benzodiazepine-class drugs are the most common treatment; they are used for symptom relief from stiffness. Other common treatments include baclofen, intravenous immunoglobin, and rituximab. Limited but encouraging therapeutic experience of haematopoietic stem cell transplantation exists for SPS.

== Signs and symptoms ==
Stiff-person syndrome (SPS) is often separated into several subtypes, based on the cause and progression of the disease.

There are three clinical classifications of SPS:

- Classic SPS, associated with other autoimmune conditions and usually GAD-positive
- Partial SPS variants
- Progressive encephalomyelitis with rigidity and myoclonus (PERM)

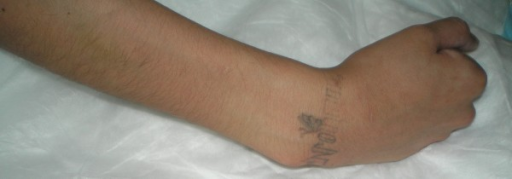
Muscle stiffness and contraction can cause abnormal resting postures.

Around 70% of those with SPS have the "classic" form of the disease. People with classic SPS typically first experience intermittent tightness or aching in the muscles of the trunk. These muscles repeatedly and involuntarily contract, causing them to grow and rigidify. Eventually, rigidified muscles reduce the affected person's range of motion, slow their voluntary movements, and may cause them to have abnormal posture, particularly lumbar hyperlordosis (a distinctive curve in the lower back). Rigid trunk muscles can also prevent the chest and abdomen from expanding, causing shortness of breath and early satiety. In many people with SPS, muscle rigidity eventually progresses from the trunk to the limbs — first affecting muscles closest to the trunk, then further. Stiffened limbs can affect a person's balance and gait, causing awkward 'statue-like' falls, where the affected person cannot put out their arms to soften the impact. Alongside growing stiffness, many with SPS develop bouts of muscle spasms that are triggered by sudden movements and feeling upset or startled. Spasms are sometimes accompanied by elevated blood pressure, heart rate, body temperature, and sweating. Some experience chronic muscle pain.

The muscle stiffness initially fluctuates, sometimes for days or weeks, but eventually begins to consistently impair mobility. As the disease progresses, patients sometimes become unable to walk or bend. Chronic pain is common and worsens over time, but sometimes acute pain occurs as well. Stress, cold weather, and infections lead to an increase in symptoms, and sleep decreases them.

SPS patients experience superimposed spasms and extreme sensitivity to touch and sound. These spasms primarily occur in the proximal limb and axial muscles. Spasms usually last for minutes and can recur over hours. Attacks of spasms are unpredictable and are often caused by fast movements, emotional distress, or sudden sounds or touches. In rare cases, facial muscles, hands, feet, and the chest can be affected, and unusual eye movements and vertigo occur. Brisk stretch reflexes and clonus occur in patients. Late in the disease's progression, hypnagogic myoclonus can occur.

In addition to their physical symptoms, many with SPS experience neurological and psychiatric disorders. Some with SPS have various neurological disorders that affect physical reflexes and the movement of the eyes. Some also experience anxiety, depression, alcohol use disorders, and phobias — particularly agoraphobia. Most patients are psychologically normal and respond reasonably to their situations.

A minority of people with SPS experience "partial" SPS, also called "stiff-limb syndrome", where the muscle contractions and stiffness are limited to the limbs, or sometimes a single limb. This syndrome develops into full SPS about 25% of the time. The stiffness begins in one limb and remains most prominent there. Sphincter and brainstem issues often occur with stiff-limb syndrome.

Progressive encephalomyelitis with rigidity and myoclonus, another variant of the condition, includes symptoms of SPS, with brainstem issues, autonomic disturbances, and myoclonus. In some cases, the limbic system is affected, too. Most patients have upper motor neuron issues and autonomic disturbances.

Around 5% of those with SPS experience the symptoms as a paraneoplastic syndrome — a result of a tumor elsewhere in the body releasing bioactive molecules. Paraneoplastic SPS can affect either a single limb, or the trunk and limbs together.

== Causes ==
Patients with SPS generally have high glutamic acid decarboxylase (GAD) antibody levels in their blood. About 80% of SPS patients have GAD antibodies, compared with about 1% of the general population. The overwhelming majority of people who have GAD antibodies do not develop SPS, indicating that systemic synthesis of the antibody is not the sole cause of SPS. GAD, a presynaptic autoantigen, is generally thought to play a key role in the condition, but exact details of the way autoantibodies affect SPS patients are not known. Most SPS patients with high-titer GAD antibodies also have antibodies that inhibit GABA-receptor-associated protein (GABARAP). Autoantibodies against amphiphysin and gephyrin are also sometimes found in SPS patients. The antibodies appear to interact with antigens in the brain neurons and the spinal-cord synapses, causing a functional blockade of the inhibitory neurotransmitter gamma-aminobutyric acid (GABA). This leads to GABA impairment, which probably causes the stiffness and spasms that characterize SPS. There are low GABA levels in the motor cortexes of SPS patients.

Why GAD autoimmunity occurs in SPS patients is unknown, and whether SPS qualifies as a neuroautoimmune disorder has been questioned. Also unknown is whether these antibodies are pathogenic. The level of GAD antibody titers found in SPS patients does not correlate with disease severity, indicating that these titer levels do not need to be monitored. GAD antibodies have not been proven to be the sole cause of SPS, but possibly they are a marker or an epiphenomenon of the condition's cause.

In SPS patients, motor-unit neurons fire involuntarily in a way that resembles a normal contraction. Motor-unit potentials fire while the patient is at rest, particularly in the muscles that are stiff. The excessive firing of motor neurons may be caused by malfunctions in spinal and suprasegmental inhibitory networks that use GABA. Involuntary actions show up as voluntary on EMG scans; even when the patient tries to relax, agonist and antagonist contractions occur.

In a minority of patients with SPS, breast, ovarian, or lung cancer manifests paraneoplastically as proximal muscle stiffness. These cancers are associated with the synaptic proteins amphiphysin and gephyrin. Paraneoplastic SPS with amphiphysin antibodies and breast adenocarcinoma tend to occur together. These patients tend not to have GAD antibodies. Passive transfer of SPS by plasma injection has been demonstrated in paraneoplastic SPS, but not in classical SPS.

Evidence exists of genetic influence on SPS risk. The HLA class II locus makes patients susceptible to the condition. Most SPS patients have the DQB1* 0201 allele. This allele is also associated with type 1 diabetes.

== Diagnosis ==
SPS is diagnosed by evaluating clinical findings and excluding other conditions. No specific laboratory test confirms its presence. Due to the rarity and varied symptoms of SPS, most affected by the disease wait several years before they are correctly diagnosed.

The presence of antibodies against GAD is the best indication of the condition that can be detected by blood and cerebrospinal fluid (CSF) testing. Anti-GAD65 is found in about 80% of SPS patients. Antithyroid, anti-intrinsic factor, antinuclear, anti-RNP, and antigliadin antibodies are also often found in blood tests. Electromyography demonstrates involuntary motor unit firing in SPS patients. It can confirm the SPS diagnosis by noting spasms in distant muscles as a result of subnoxious stimulation of cutaneous or mixed nerves. Responsiveness to diazepam helps confirm that the patient has SPS, as this drug decreases stiffness and motor-unit firing.

The same general criteria are used to diagnose paraneoplastic SPS as for the normal form of the condition. Once SPS is diagnosed, poor response to conventional therapies and the presence of cancer indicate that it may be paraneoplastic. CT scans are indicated for SPS patients who respond poorly to therapy to determine if cancer is the cause.

A variety of conditions have similar symptoms to SPS, including myelopathies, dystonias, spinocerebellar degenerations, primary lateral sclerosis, neuromyotonia, and some psychogenic disorders. Tetanus, neuroleptic malignant syndrome, malignant hyperpyrexia, chronic spinal interneuronitis, serotonin syndrome, multiple sclerosis, and Parkinson's disease should also be excluded.

Patients' fears and phobias often incorrectly lead doctors to think their symptoms are psychogenic, and they are sometimes suspected of malingering. An average of six years pass after the onset of symptoms before the disease is diagnosed.

== Treatment ==
No evidence-based treatment has been found for SPS, nor have large, controlled trials of treatments for the condition been conducted. The rarity of the disease complicates efforts to establish guidelines.

Nonetheless, first line treatment strategies include managing the symptoms with GABA-ergic drugs, such as diazepam and baclofen. Immunotherapies, such as IVIG and rituxamab, can also be used in individuals who have inadequate response to symptomatic management. Physical therapy may also help.

== Prognosis ==
The progression of SPS depends on whether it is a typical or abnormal form of the condition, and the presence of comorbidities. Early recognition and neurological treatment can limit its progression. SPS is generally responsive to treatment, but the condition usually progresses and stabilizes periodically. Even with treatment, quality of life generally declines as stiffness precludes many activities. Some patients require mobility aids due to the risk of falls. About 65% of SPS patients are unable to function independently. About 10% require intensive care at some point; sudden death occurs in about the same percentage of patients. These deaths are usually caused by metabolic acidosis or an autonomic crisis.

== Epidemiology ==
SPS is estimated to have a prevalence of about one or two per million people. It affects women up to three times as frequently as men. In the United Kingdom, 119 cases were identified between 2000 and 2005. It does not predominantly occur in any racial or ethnic group. SPS can start at any age, though it most frequently occurs in people in their 40s. About 35% of SPS patients have type I diabetes.

== History ==
SPS was first described by Frederick Moersch and Henry Woltman in 1956, who named it "stiff-man syndrome". Their description of the disease was based on 14 cases that they had observed over 32 years. Using electromyography, they noted that motor-unit firing suggested that contractions of voluntary muscle were occurring in their patients. Previously, cases of SPS had been dismissed as psychogenic problems. Clinical diagnostic criteria were developed by Gordon et al. in 1967. They observed "persistent tonic contraction reflected in constant firing, even at rest" after providing patients with muscle relaxants and examining them with electromyography. In 1989, criteria for an SPS diagnosis were adopted that included episodic axial stiffness, progression of stiffness, lordosis, and triggered spasms. The name of the disease was changed from "stiff-man syndrome" to the gender-neutral "stiff-person syndrome" in 1991.

In 1963, diazepam was determined to help alleviate symptoms of SPS. Corticosteroids were first used to treat the condition in 1988, and plasma exchange was first applied the following year. The first use of intravenous immunoglobulin to treat the condition came in 1994.

In 1988, Solimena et al. discovered that autoantibodies against GAD played a key role in SPS. Two years later, Solimena found the antibodies in 20 out of 33 patients examined. In the late 1980s, the serum of SPS patients was also found to bind to GABAergic neurons. In 2006, the role of GABARAP in SPS was discovered. The first case of paraneoplastic SPS was found in 1975. In 1993, anti-amphiphysin was shown to play a role in paraneoplastic SPS, and seven years later, anti-gephyrin was also found to be involved in the condition.

=== Cases ===
In December 2022, the Canadian singer Céline Dion announced that she had been diagnosed with stiff-person syndrome, resulting in cancelled performances. In July 2024, she performed "Hymne à l'amour" at the opening ceremony of the Paris Olympic Games, her first public performance since her diagnosis.

== See also ==
- Hyperekplexia
- Satoyoshi syndrome
- Paralysis
