= Conantokin =

Identifiers
- Symbol: Conantokin
- Pfam: PF10550
- InterPro: IPR005918
- PROSITE: PS60025
- SCOP2: 1ONT / SCOPe / SUPFAM
Available protein structures:
- Pfam: structures / ECOD
- PDB: RCSB PDB; PDBe; PDBj
- PDBsum: structure summary

Conantokins are a small family of helical peptides that are derived from the venom of predatory marine snails of the genus Conus. Conantokins act as potent and specific antagonists of the N-methyl-D-aspartate receptor (NMDAR). They are the only naturally-derived peptides to do so. The subtypes of conantokins exhibit a surprising variability of selectivity across the NMDAR subunits, and are therefore uniquely useful in developing subunit-specific pharmacological probes.

Chemically, conantokins are unique in that they possess a number (generally 4 or 5) of gamma-carboxyglutamyl (Gla) residues, generated by the post-translational modification of glutamyl (Glu) residues. These Gla residues induce a conformational change from a 3_{10} helix to an alpha helix on binding to Calcium. In the broader scheme of genetic conotoxin classification, Conanotokins are also known as "Conotoxin Superfamily B."

The word "conantokin" is derived from the Filipino word antokin, meaning sleepy.

== Subtypes ==
Conantokin are in general named after the specific epithet of the Conus species it is found in, using single-letter abbreviations if possible. A conantokin from Conus radiatus is called Conantokin-R, but the latter-discovered ones from Conus rolani are called Conantokin-Rl. If a species makes multiple conantokins, numbers or letters are suffixed to the names. The abbreviation for "Conantokin" in these names is always "Con".

=== Conantokin-G ===
Also known as the “sleeper peptide” or CGX-1007, Conantokin G (P07231) is a small peptide isolated from the fish-hunting snail, Conus geographus. It is the best-characterized conantokin, and acts as a functional inhibitor of NMDAR.

Con-G shows potential as a neuroprotective agent in ischemic and excitotoxic brain injury, neuronal apoptosis, pain, epilepsy, and as a research tool in drug addiction and Alzheimer's disease. Con-G blocks NMDAR-mediated excitatory postsynaptic currents (EPSCs). Con-G reduces the strength of excitotoxic intracellular Ca^{2+} actions and blocks different neuronal injuries in vitro. In certain injuries Con-G shows an exceptional prolongation of the therapeutic window. Con-G can reverse established allodynia and can also fully reverse thermal hypersensitivity induced by nerve injury.

=== Conantokin-T ===
Con-T (P17684) is purified from the venom of the fish-hunting cone-snail, Conus tulipa. This peptide has 4 residues of Gla. Con-T acts by inhibiting NMDAR-mediated Ca^{2+} influx in neurons in the central nervous system.

=== Conantokin-R and -L ===
Con-R (P58806) is a highly potent anticonvulsant compound, derived from Conus radiatus.

Con-L (P69745) is an efficient anticonvulsant compound, derived from Conus lynceus. It differs from Con-R mainly in the C-terminal amino acids and, like Con-R, it induces sleep-like symptoms in young mice, with faster onset and for a longer duration.

Con-L blocks NMDA-evoked currents in a powerful way, which is only slowly reversible upon washout, similar to Con-R and Con-G.

=== Conantokin-Pr1, -Pr2 and –Pr3 ===
Each peptide in this group is derived from the same species, Conus parius. Con-Pr3 (P0C8E2) has three different post-translational modifications. Con-Pr1 (P0C8E0) and –Pr2 (P0C8E1) adopt α-helical conformations in the presence of Mg^{2+} and Ca^{2+}, but otherwise are generally unstructured. Conantokin-Pr3 always adopts an α-helical conformation.

These peptides have highest potency for the NR2B subunits of the NMDAR.

=== Conantokin-P and -E ===
Con-P (P0C8E3) and Con-E (P0C8D9) were isolated from the only two fish-hunting cone snails of the Americas (Conus purpurascens and Conus ermineus, respectively). Con-P differs from the other known conantokins in that it contains a long disulfide loop with two Gla residues. It is less helical (estimated 44% helical content), but unlike con-G, it does not require calcium for stability of this structure. Another notable distinction is the increased discrimination for NR2B. Con-E is very similar in structure to Con-P, and is likely to have a similar function.

=== Conantokin-Rl-A ===
Con-Rl-A (P0DKY9), derived from the venom of Conus rolani, is unique among the conantokins in having two distinct conformational states between which it equilibrates. Like Con-P and Con-E, its helical structure (estimated at 50%) does not depend on the presence or absence of calcium. This is likely due to the fact that two of the five Gla residues present in con-G are replaced in con-Rl-A by Lys. Con-R1-A discriminates more effectively than any other known ligand between the NR2B and NR2C subunits of NMDAR.

=== Conantokin-Br or -S1 ===
Con-Br (or Con-S1, P0CG46) is isolated from Conus brettinghami (now Conus sulcatus), and is the only known conantokin with a high selectivity for the NR2D subunit of NMDAR.

== Synthetic derivatives ==
=== Con-G-based ===
Con-G[γ7A] Con-G[γ7K] and Con-G[S16Y] are synthetic Con-G peptides, where the Gla residue at position 7 is replaced with an alanine or a lysine residue, or the serine at position 16 is replaced with a tyrosine residue, respectively. Con-G[γ7A] is fourfold more potent than the native peptide, Con-G, while Con-G[γ7K] is as potent as Con-G. The first two peptides appear to distinguish NMDAR subtypes in mid-frontal gyri from those in superior temporal gyri in human brain tissue. Both of them are being researched in relation to Alzheimer's disease (AD) and all three evoked 100% inhibition of spermine-enhanced [^{3}H]MK-801 binding. Con-G[γ7K] and Con-G[S16Y] also show positive results in morphine withdrawal.

=== Con-T-based ===
Con-T[K7γ] is a synthetic Con-T peptide, where the serine at position 7 is replaced with Gla residue. Like Con-G, it has higher affinity for Mg^{2+} than for Ca^{2+}, but does not dimerize in the presence of Mg^{2+}.

== Chemistry ==
Biochemically, conantokins have a distinctive high γ-carboxyglutamate content and low cysteine content. Conantokins typically lack disulfide bonds, in contrast to most families of conotoxins, which have an unusually high density of disulfide cross-links.

The inhibition of NMDAR-mediated spontaneous EPSCs (sEPSCs) and NMDA-gated currents in cortical neurons might be a result of actions on both diheteromeric (NR1/NR2B) and triheteromeric (NR1/NR2A/NR2B) NMDAR.

== Mode of action ==
Con-G does not act directly at the glycine binding site. It can attenuate both the amplitude and the decay time constant of NMDA-mediated EPSCs and significantly and reversibly affect other different properties of NMDAR-mediated sEPSCs in cultured neurons. The effect of Con-G on the frequency of the sEPSCs most likely relates to antagonizing the NMDAR.

== Target ==
Conantokins target NMDAR. Each subtype selectively targets different subunits of the receptor.

== Toxicity ==
Some of these peptide effects are age-dependent, such as the induction of sleep-like state in young mice and hyperactive behavior in older mice.

Intrathecal administration of doses greater than 300 pmol produced motor impairment in mice.
Con-G, Con-R and Con-L cause behavioral toxicity at similar doses. Thus the difference in the C-terminal sequence might affect the anticonvulsant and behavioral toxicity profile.
