= Vexillum maduranum =

Scientific classification
- Kingdom: Animalia
- Phylum: Mollusca
- Class: Gastropoda
- Subclass: Caenogastropoda
- Order: Neogastropoda
- Superfamily: Turbinelloidea
- Family: Costellariidae
- Genus: Vexillum
- Species: V. maduranum

Binomial name
- Vexillum maduranum Dekkers, 2007

Synonyms
- Vexillum (Vexillum) maduranum Dekkers, 2007

Species of gastropod

Vexillum maduranum is a species of small sea snail, marine gastropod mollusk in the family Costellariidae, the ribbed miters.

== Description ==
The length of the shell attains 39.3 mm. The shell is elongated, turreted, longitudinally ribbed or plicate. The spire is acuminated. The aperture is narrow. The columella shows numerous plaits. The outer lip is internally striated.

Vexillum species produce complex venoms dominated by highly diversified short cysteine-rich peptides, vexitoxins, related to conotoxins.

== Distribution ==
This marine species occurs off the Philippines and Indonesia.
