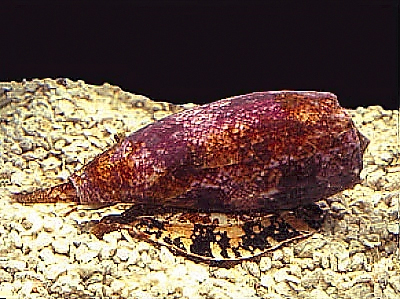
- A live specimen of Conus geographus

Conservation status
- Least Concern (IUCN 3.1)

Scientific classification
- Kingdom: Animalia
- Phylum: Mollusca
- Class: Gastropoda
- Subclass: Caenogastropoda
- Order: Neogastropoda
- Superfamily: Conoidea
- Family: Conidae
- Genus: Conus
- Species: C. geographus

Binomial name
- Conus geographus Linnaeus, 1758

Synonyms
- Conus (Gastridium) geographus Linnaeus, 1758 · accepted, alternate representation; Gastridium geographus (Linnaeus, 1758 )

= Conus geographus =

Species of sea snail

Conus geographus, popularly called the geography cone, geographer cone, or geographic cone, is a species of predatory cone snail. It lives in reefs of the tropical Indo-Pacific and hunts small fish. While all cone snails hunt and kill prey using venom, the venom of Conus geographus is potent enough to kill humans.

The variety Conus geographus var. rosea G. B. Sowerby I, 1833 is a synonym of Conus eldredi Morrison, 1955. This species is the type species of Gastridium Modeer, 1793, Rollus Montfort, 1810, and Utriculus Schumacher, 1817.

== Shell description ==
C. geographus has a broad, thin shell which is cylindrically inflated. Geography cones grow to about 10 to 15 cm (4 to 6 in) in length. The size of an adult shell varies between 43 and 166 mm (1.7 and 6.5 in). The ground color of the shell is pink or violaceous white, occasionally reddish. It has a mottled appearance, clouded and coarsely reticulated with chestnut or chocolate, usually forming two very irregular bands. This intricate brown-and-white pattern is highly prized by shell collectors.

The geography cone has a wide, violaceous white or pink aperture and numerous shoulder ridges or spines. The shell is covered with thread-like revolving striae, usually nearly obsolete except at the base. The flattened spire is striated and coronated.

In comparison with other species, the shell has a noticeably wider and convex mid-body with a flattened spire. Its walls are also noticeably thinner and lighter compared to other cone shells of similar length and size.

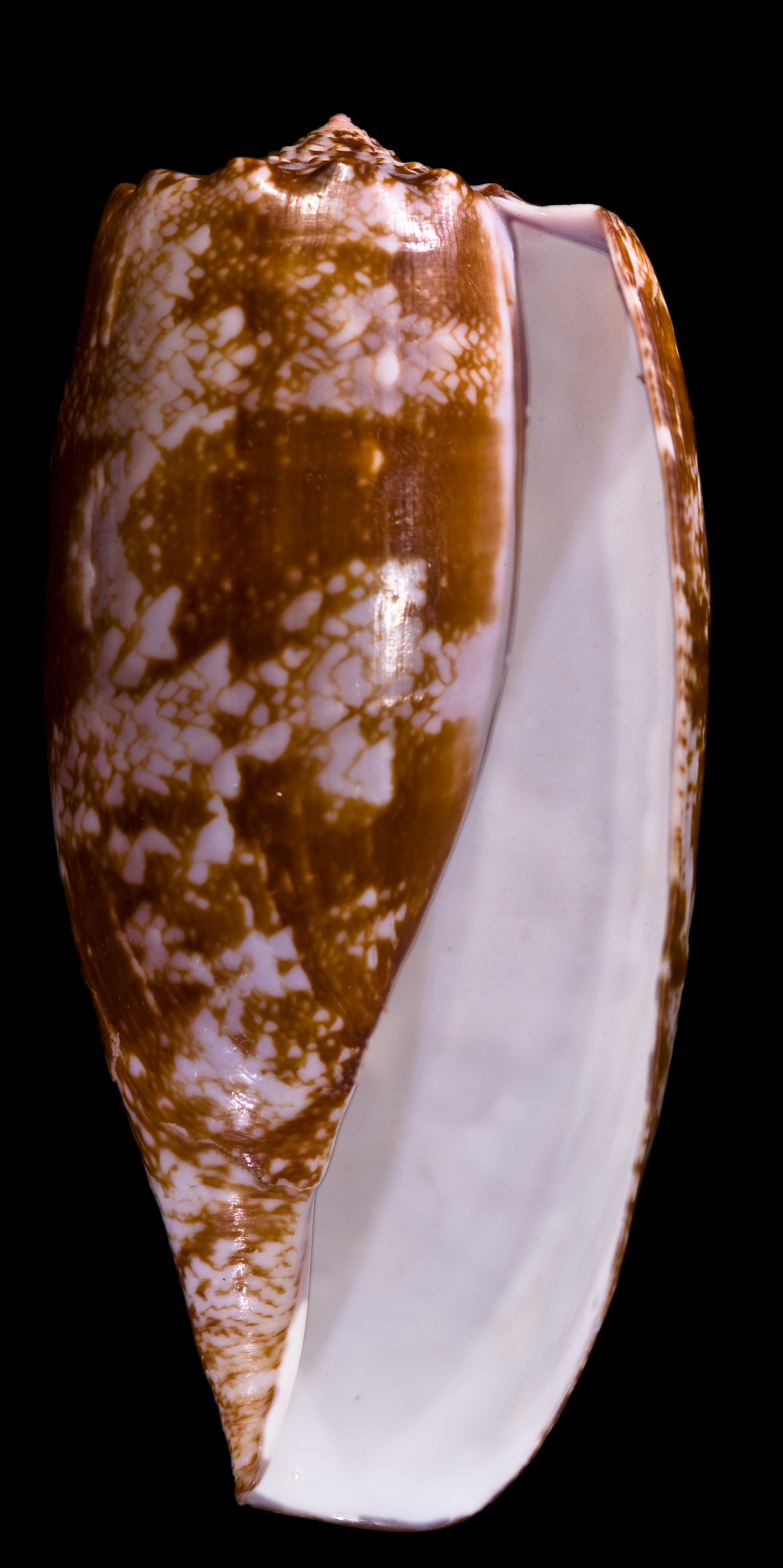
Apertural view

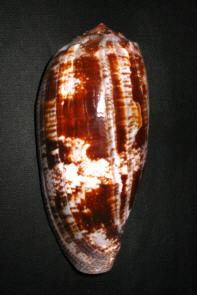
Abapertural view

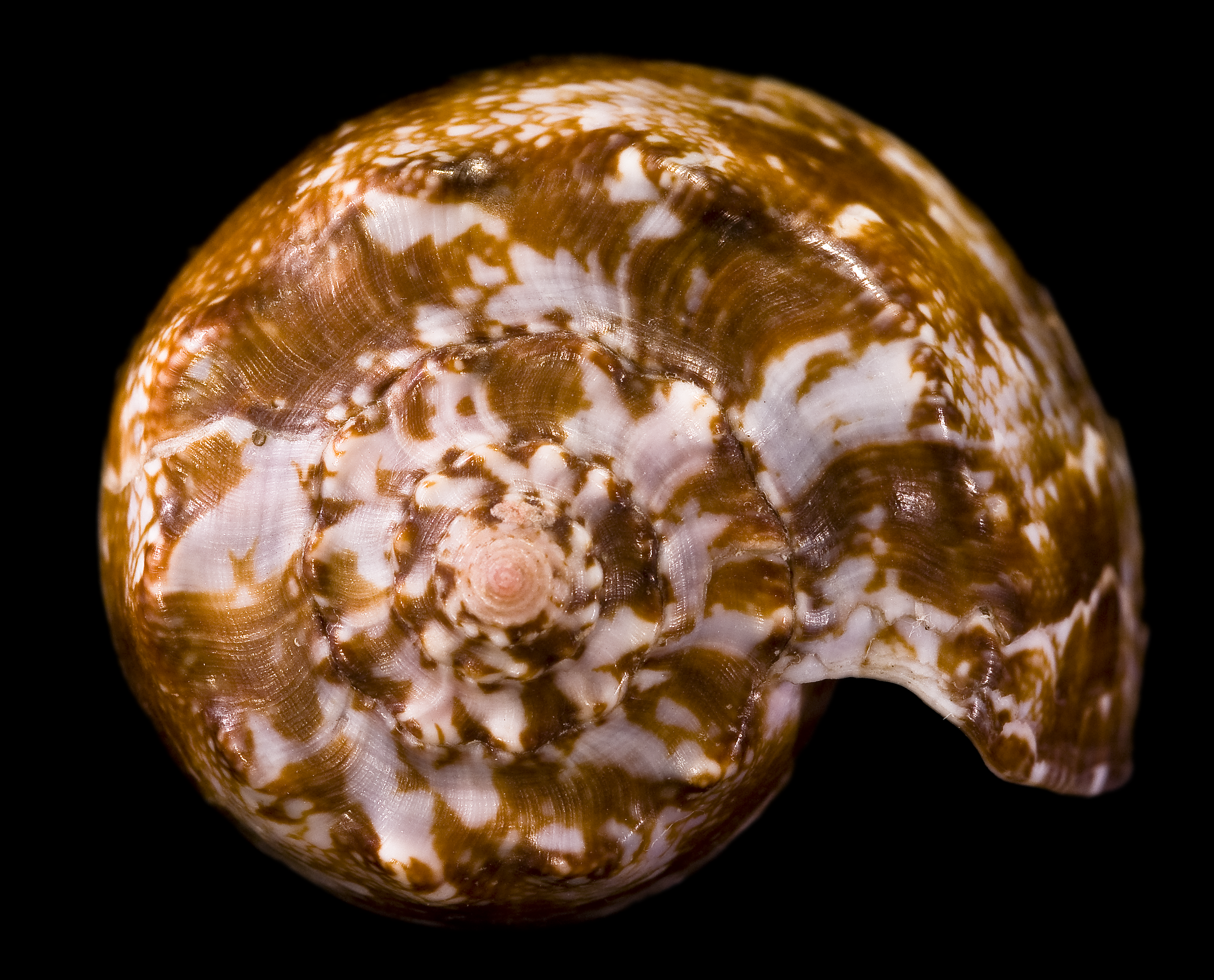
Apical view

== Distribution ==
Geography cones are common. They occur in the Red Sea and in the Indian Ocean off Chagos, Réunion, Madagascar, Mauritius, Mozambique and Tanzania. They are indigenous to the reefs of the Indo-Pacific region, except for Hawaii, and off Australia (the Northern Territory, Queensland, Western Australia). Since the distribution of C. geographus can largely be explained by the temperature of its habitat, alterations due to climate change are predicted to impact its distribution in the following decades. The seas around Southeast Asia are in parts predicted to have a higher suitability by 2090, while parts of Australia and Africa's eastern coast could become less suitable.

== Ecology ==
C. geographus is a piscivore that dwells in sediment of shallow reefs, preying on small fish. Like other cone snails, it fires a harpoon-like, venom-tipped modified tooth into its prey; the harpoon is attached to the body by a proboscis, and the prey is pulled inside for ingestion.

== Venom ==
The geography cone snail is highly venomous; live specimens should be handled with extreme caution. C. geographus has the most toxic sting known among Conus species and there are reports for about 36 human fatalities over the past 300 years. The venom has a median lethal dose in the range of 0.012–0.030 mg/kg. The venom of the geography cone snail is a complex mix of hundreds of different toxins that is delivered through a toxoglossan radula, a harpoon-like tooth propelled from an extendable proboscis. There is no antivenom for a cone snail sting, and treatment consists of keeping victims alive until symptoms wear off. The geography cone is also known colloquially as the "cigarette snail", a gallows humor exaggeration implying that, when stung by this creature, the victim will have only enough time to smoke a cigarette before dying. In reality, even the most venomous cone snails take about one to five hours to kill a healthy human, though medical care must still be prompt as, without it, death is almost certain.

Among the compounds found in cone snail venom are proteins which, when isolated, have great potential as pain-killing drugs. Research shows that certain component proteins of the venom target specific human pain receptors and can be up to 10,000 times more effective than morphine, without morphine's addictive properties and side effects. Conotoxin-G is a toxin derived from the venom of C. geographus. Only 15–20 of the venom's 100–200 toxic peptides are used for feeding. It is believed that the other compounds are defensive, and that the venom is mainly used for defense.

=== Insulin ===
Recent research has revealed that C. geographus uses a form of insulin as a means of stunning its prey. This insulin is distinct from its own (with shorter chains) and appears to be a stripped-down version of those insulins found in fish. Once this venom passes through a fish's gills, the fish experiences hypoglycaemic shock, essentially stunning it and allowing for ingestion by the snail. This poison mixture has been referred to as nirvana cabal. Besides the tulip cone snail, C. tulipa, no other species of any known lifeform is known to use its own biological insulin as a weapon.

== Predator and prey ==
C. geographus is piscivorous. The size of the prey depends on the snail's size and is not limited to certain species. The poisonous weever fish is also included in the diet. As an adult, the geography cone can fall prey to sea turtles, rays, birds, and human collectors. The hawksbill sea turtle is an omnivore whose main diet consists of sponges such as the Caribbean barrel sponge (Xestospongia muta) or the loggerhead sponge (Spheciospongia vesparium), which are known to choke coral reefs and opportunistically consume other things such as mollusks and snails.

== Gallery ==
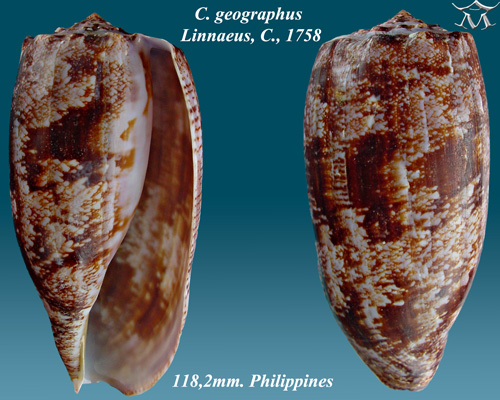
Conus geographus Linnaeus, C., 1758

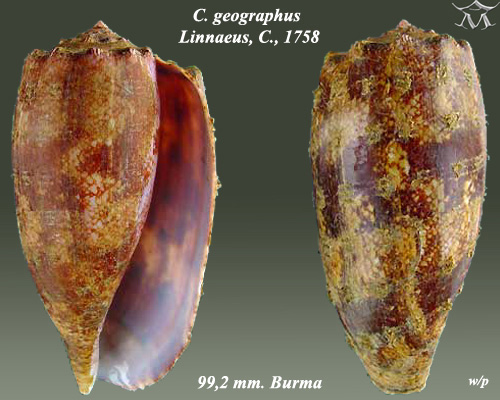
Conus geographus Linnaeus, C., 1758

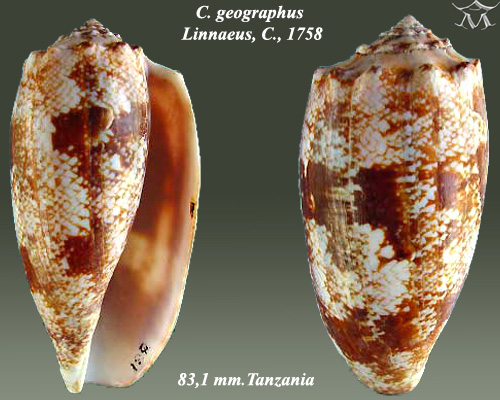
Conus geographus Linnaeus, C., 1758

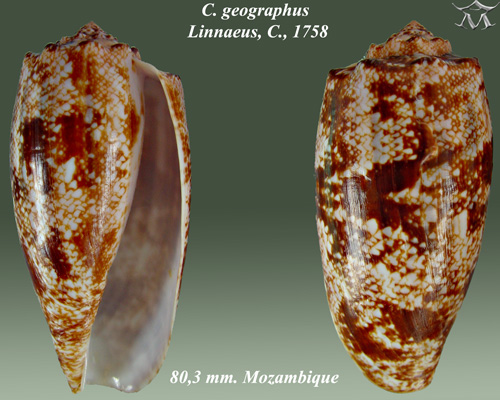
Conus geographus Linnaeus, C., 1758
