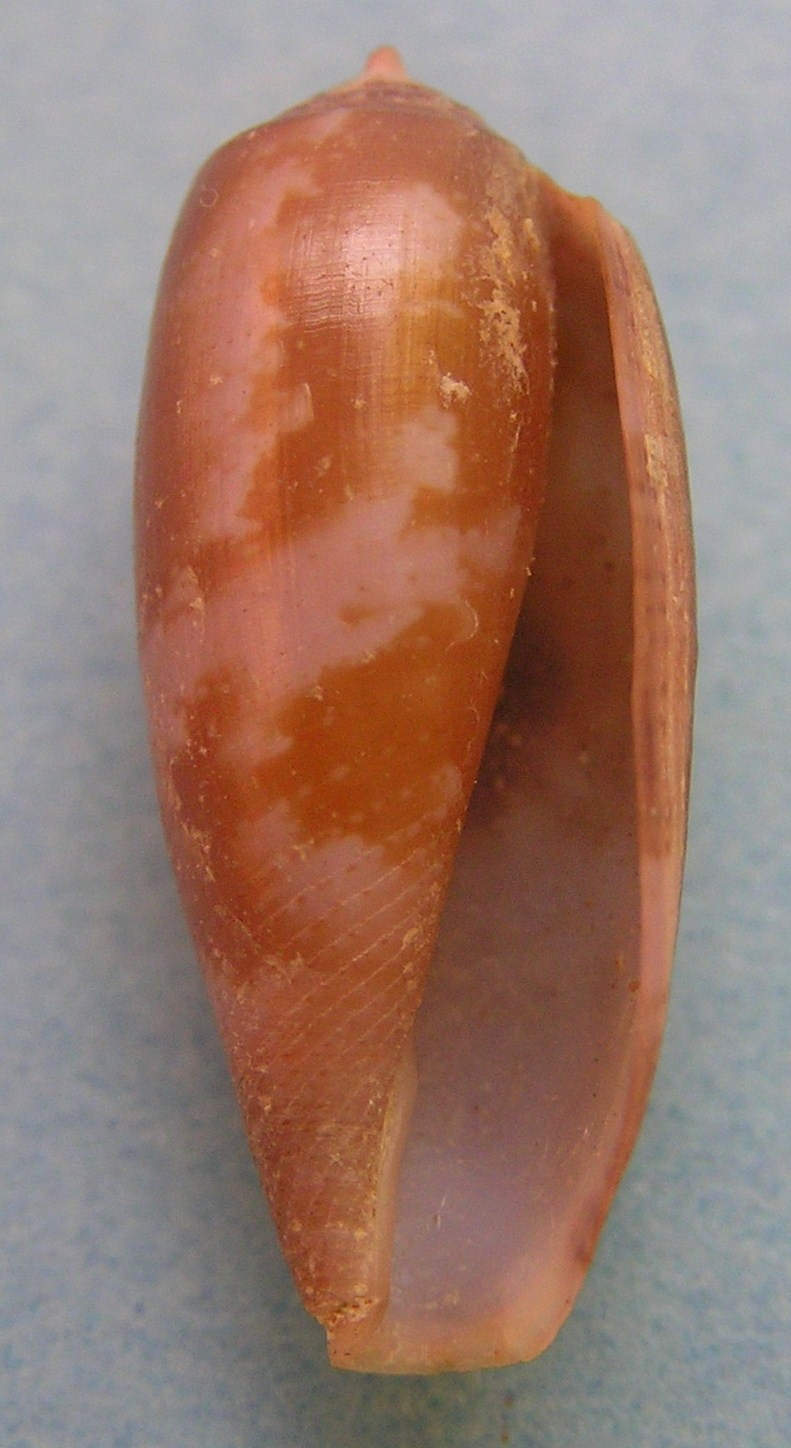
- Apertural view of Conus obscurus

Scientific classification
- Kingdom: Animalia
- Phylum: Mollusca
- Class: Gastropoda
- Subclass: Caenogastropoda
- Order: Neogastropoda
- Superfamily: Conoidea
- Family: Conidae
- Genus: Conus
- Species: C. obscurus

Binomial name
- Conus obscurus G. B. Sowerby I, 1833

Synonyms
- Conus (Gastridium) obscurus G. B. Sowerby I, 1833 · accepted, alternate representation; Conus halitropus Bartsch & Rehder, 1943; Gastridium obscurus Habe, 1964; Protostrioconus obscurus (G.B. Sowerby I, 1833)

= Conus obscurus =

Species of sea snail

Conus obscurus, common name the obscure cone, is a species of sea snail, a marine gastropod mollusk in the family Conidae, the cone snails and their allies.

Like all species within the genus Conus, these snails are predatory and venomous. They are capable of stinging humans, therefore live ones should be handled carefully or not at all.

== Description ==
The size of an adult shell varies between 20 mm and 44 mm. This small to medium-sized shell is shaped like a small Conus geographus but with smaller coronations on the shoulder. The shell is subcylindrical, violaceous, with chestnut blotches, forming two interrupted bands, and faint lines of minute chestnut and white articulations. The aperture is very wide anteriorly caused by a concave lower half of the columella.

== Distribution ==
This species occurs in the Indian Ocean off Aldabra, the Mascarene Basin and Tanzania; in the tropical Indo-Pacific to Hawaii and French Polynesia; off the Philippines and Australia (Northern Territory, Queensland and Western Australia), and Vanuatu.

== Gallery ==
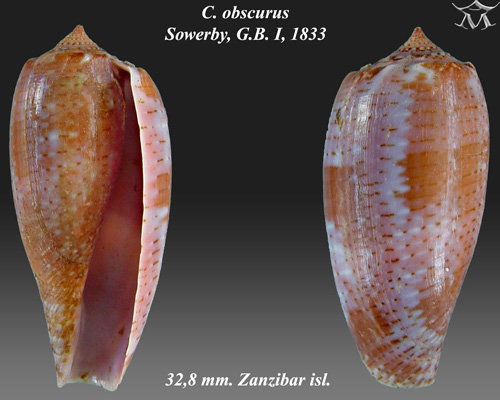
Conus obscurus Sowerby, G.B. I, 1833

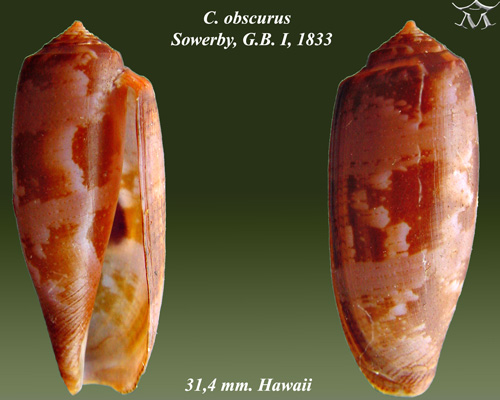
Conus obscurus Sowerby, G.B. I, 1833

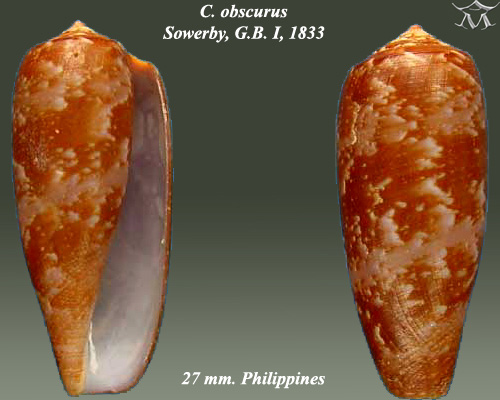
Conus obscurus Sowerby, G.B. I, 1833

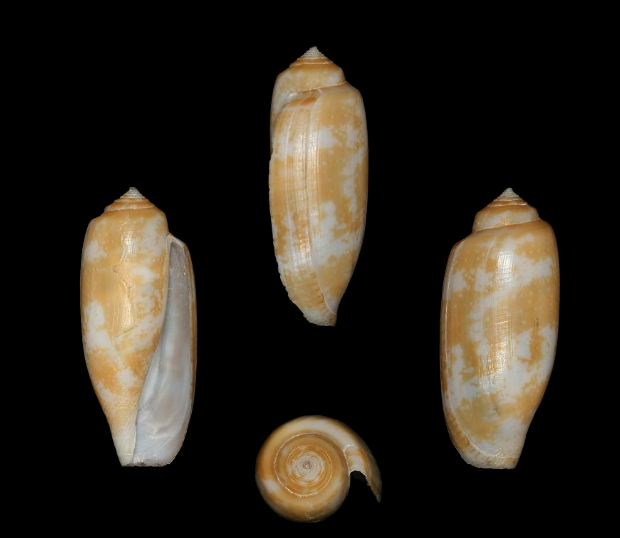
Holotype of the synonym Conus halitropus
