= GRIN2D =

Protein-coding gene in the species Homo sapiens

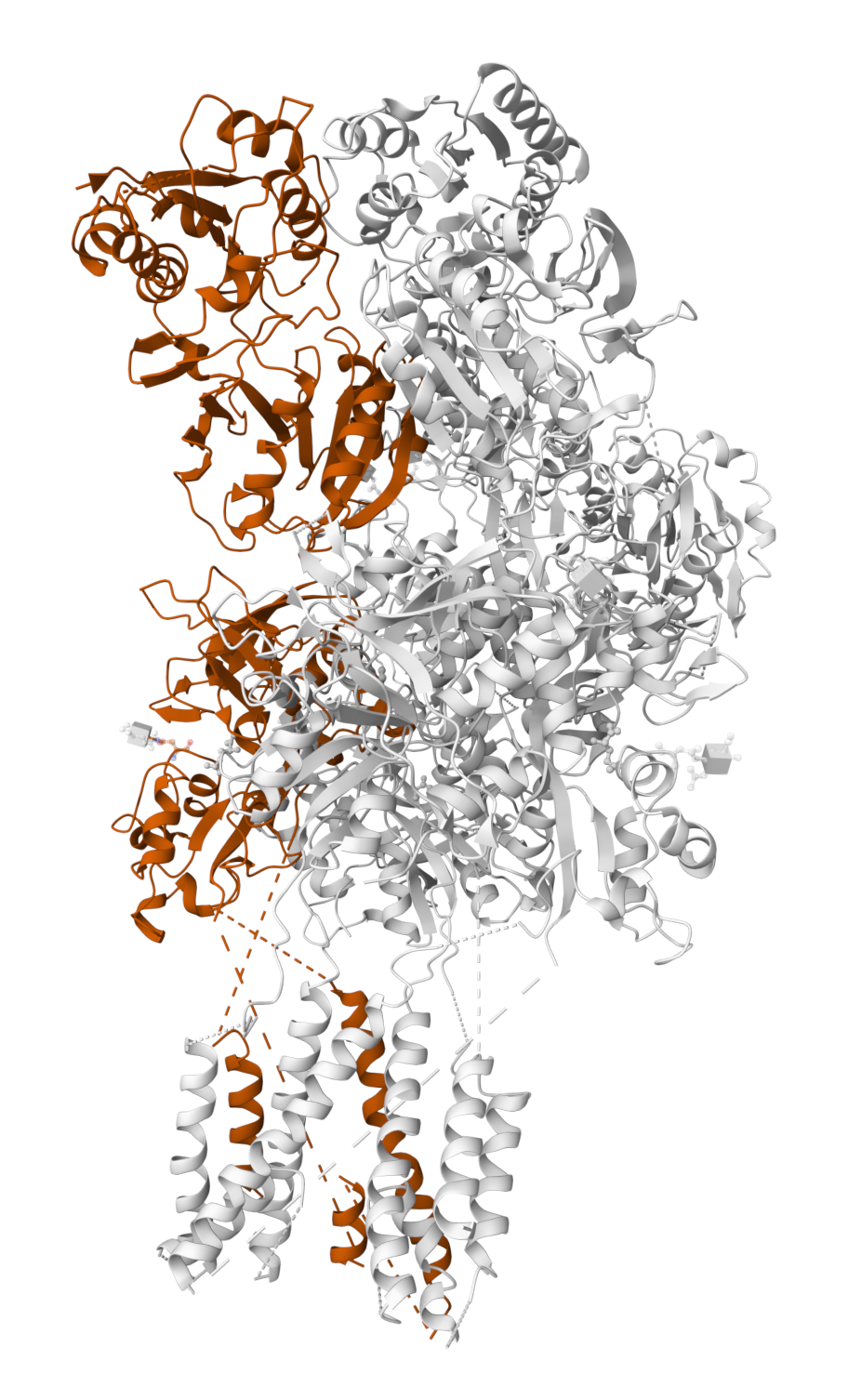

Identifiers
- Aliases: GRIN2D, EB11, GluN2D, NMDAR2D, NR2D, glutamate ionotropic receptor NMDA type subunit 2D, EIEE46, DEE46
- External IDs: OMIM: 602717; MGI: 95823; GeneCards: GRIN2D

Gene location (Human)
Chr.	Chromosome 19 (human)
Band	19q13.33	Start	48,393,668 bp
Band	19q13.33	End	48,444,931 bp

Gene location (Mouse)
Chr.	Chromosome 7 (mouse)
Band	7 B3|7 29.54 cM	Start	45,831,883 bp
Band	7 B3|7 29.54 cM	End	45,878,378 bp
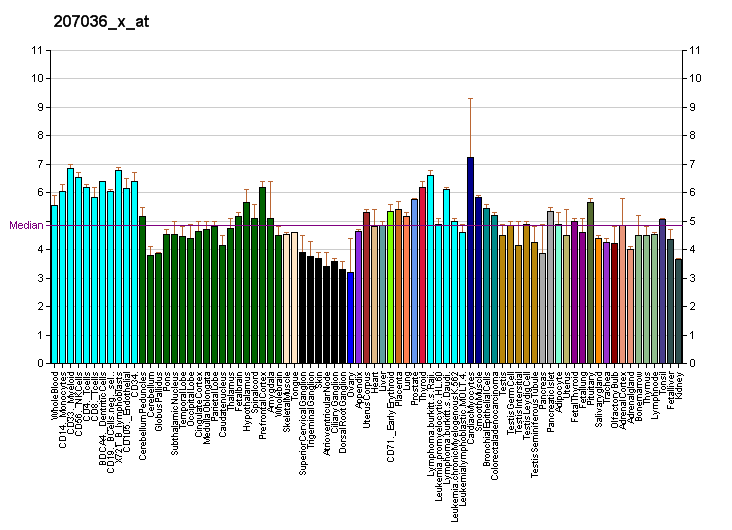
RNA expression pattern
Bgee	Human / Mouse (ortholog); Top expressed in: cingulate gyrus; anterior cingulate cortex; prefrontal cortex; ganglionic eminence; hypothalamus; ventricular zone; right frontal lobe; lateral nuclear group of thalamus; amygdala; dorsolateral prefrontal cortex / Top expressed in: molecular layer of cerebellar cortex; lumbar subsegment of spinal cord; molar; primary visual cortex; seminiferous tubule; dorsomedial hypothalamic nucleus; superior frontal gyrus; spermatocyte; dentate gyrus of hippocampal formation granule cell; neural layer of retina; More reference expression data
BioGPS	More reference expression data
Gene ontology
Molecular function	ion channel activity; protein binding; extracellularly glutamate-gated ion channel activity; ionotropic glutamate receptor activity; NMDA glutamate receptor activity; glutamate-gated calcium ion channel activity; signaling receptor activity
Cellular component	integral component of membrane; postsynaptic membrane; membrane; plasma membrane; synapse; cell junction; intracellular anatomical structure; integral component of plasma membrane; NMDA selective glutamate receptor complex; postsynaptic density membrane
Biological process	startle response; regulation of sensory perception of pain; adult locomotory behavior; ion transport; MAPK cascade; ionotropic glutamate receptor signaling pathway; excitatory postsynaptic potential; calcium-mediated signaling; calcium ion transmembrane import into cytosol; regulation of molecular function; brain development; regulation of synaptic plasticity; long-term potentiation; excitatory chemical synaptic transmission
Sources:Amigo / QuickGO
Orthologs
Databases	NCBI: entry; OMA: entry
Species	Human	Mouse
Entrez	2906	14814
Ensembl	ENSG00000105464	ENSMUSG00000002771
UniProt	O15399	Q03391
RefSeq (mRNA)	NM_000836	NM_008172
RefSeq (protein)	NP_000827	NP_032198
Location (UCSC)	Chr 19: 48.39 – 48.44 Mb	Chr 7: 45.83 – 45.88 Mb
PubMed search
- Wikidata
View/Edit Human	View/Edit Mouse

Glutamate [NMDA] receptor subunit epsilon-4 is a protein that in humans is encoded by the GRIN2D gene.

== Function ==
N-methyl-D-aspartate (NMDA) receptors are a class of ionotropic glutamate receptors. NMDA channel has been shown to be involved in long-term potentiation, an activity-dependent increase in the efficiency of synaptic transmission thought to underlie certain kinds of memory and learning. NMDA receptor channels are heteromers composed of the key receptor subunit NMDAR1 (GRIN1) and 1 or more of the 4 NMDAR2 subunits: NMDAR2A (GRIN2A), NMDAR2B (GRIN2B), NMDAR2C (GRIN2C), and NMDAR2D (GRIN2D).

== Interactions ==
GRIN2D has been shown to interact with Interleukin 16.

== See also ==
- Glutamate receptor
- NMDA receptor
