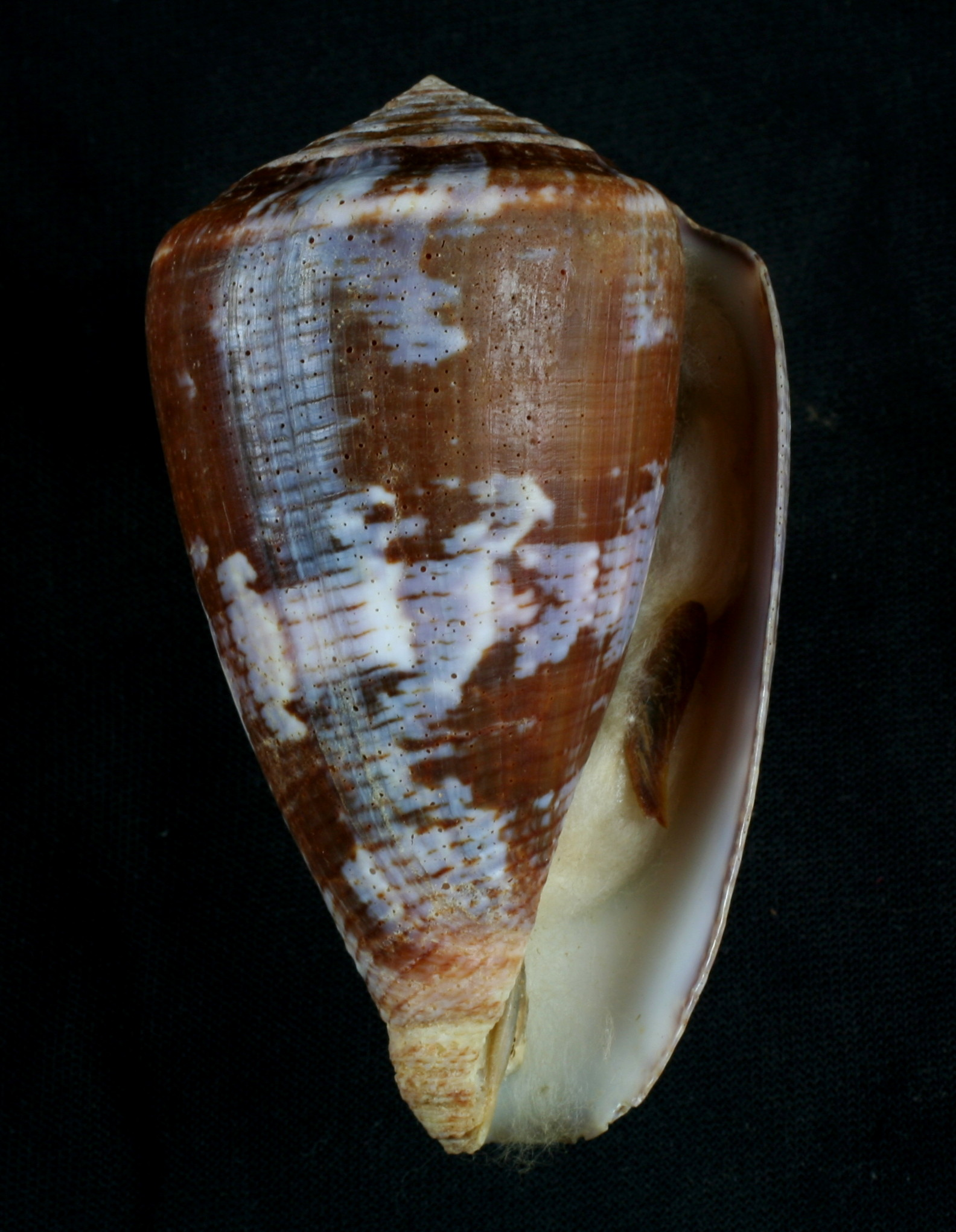
- Shell of Conus purpurascens G. B. Sowerby I, 1833, with operculum, measuring 83.7 mm in height, collected at low tide on Venudo Island, in Panama

Conservation status
- Least Concern (IUCN 3.1)

Scientific classification
- Domain: Eukaryota
- Kingdom: Animalia
- Phylum: Mollusca
- Class: Gastropoda
- Subclass: Caenogastropoda
- Order: Neogastropoda
- Superfamily: Conoidea
- Family: Conidae
- Genus: Conus
- Species: C. purpurascens

Binomial name
- Conus purpurascens G. B. Sowerby I, 1833

Synonyms
- Chelyconus purpurascens (G. B. Sowerby I, 1833); Conus (Chelyconus) purpurascens G. B. Sowerby I, 1833 · accepted, alternate representation; Conus comptus Gould, 1853; Conus luzonicus G. B. Sowerby II, 1858; Conus purpurascens var. rejectus Dall, 1910; Conus regalitatis G. B. Sowerby I, 1834

= Conus purpurascens =

Species of sea snail

Conus purpurascens, common name the purple cone, is a species of sea snail, a marine gastropod mollusk in the family Conidae, the cone snails and their allies.

Like all species within the genus Conus, these snails are predatory and venomous. They are capable of stinging humans, therefore live ones should be handled carefully or not at all. Conantokin-P is a toxin derived from the venom of Conus purpurascens.

== Description ==
The size of the shell varies between 33 mm and 80 mm. The shell is broad-shouldered, with a rude, striate spire. It is striate below, and the string sometimes is slightly granular. The shell is clouded with white or violaceous and brown or olive, with close lines of chestnut and white minute articulations. Sometimes it is irregularly white-banded in the middle.

The color variations of this handsome species are dazzling, but the general habit of the shell is quite constant.

(Original description of Conus purpurascens var. rejectus Dall, 1910) This variety has the nebulous brown very pale and scattered in very small patches over a pale purple or bluish ground color. The whole surface in front of the shoulder is rather closely painted with pale brown, thread-like, articulate, spiral lines. The pale lateral band is still notable. The spire is somewhat lower and the shoulder more angular than usual. The spire is ornamented with a few radiating brown flammules, the sutural fasciole is excavated, smooth, or with only one or two obsolete spiral striae.

== Distribution ==
This species occurs in the Central Pacific, off the Galapagos Islands and in the Gulf of California, Mexico.
