= PPP1R12B =

Protein-coding gene in humans

Identifiers
- Aliases: PPP1R12B, MYPT2, PP1bp55, protein phosphatase 1 regulatory subunit 12B
- External IDs: OMIM: 603768; MGI: 1916417; GeneCards: PPP1R12B

Gene location (Human)
Chr.	Chromosome 1 (human)
Band	1q32.1	Start	202,348,699 bp
Band	1q32.1	End	202,592,706 bp

Gene location (Mouse)
Chr.	Chromosome 1 (mouse)
Band	1|1 E4	Start	134,682,396 bp
Band	1|1 E4	End	134,883,680 bp
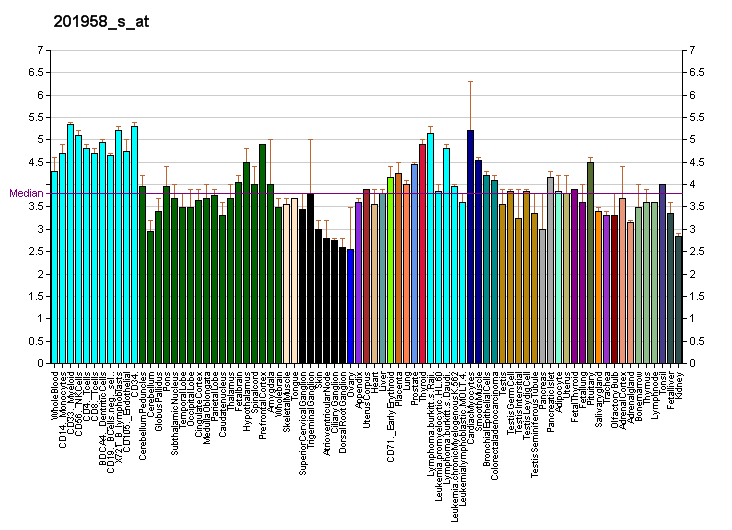

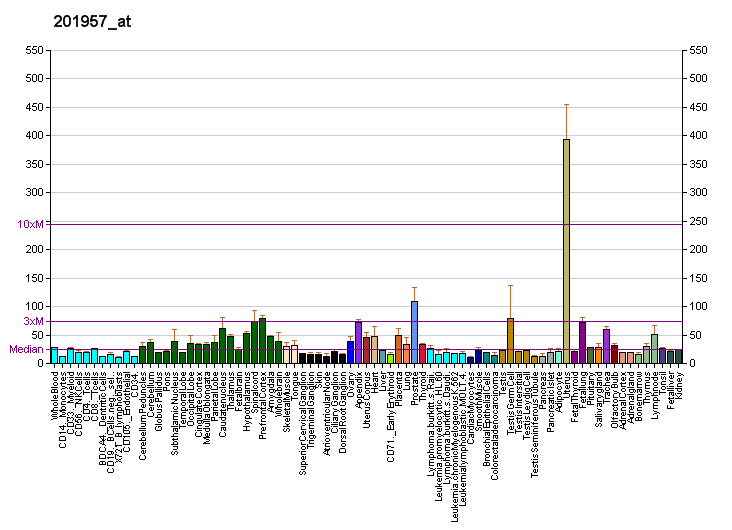
RNA expression pattern
Bgee	Human / Mouse (ortholog); Top expressed in: saphenous vein; myocardium of left ventricle; right coronary artery; cardiac muscle tissue of right atrium; right ventricle; popliteal artery; tibial arteries; tail of epididymis; thoracic aorta; ascending aorta / Top expressed in: Rostral migratory stream; ascending aorta; muscle of thigh; aortic valve; soleus muscle; extraocular muscle; digastric muscle; temporal muscle; vastus lateralis muscle; triceps brachii muscle; More reference expression data
BioGPS	More reference expression data
Gene ontology
Molecular function	enzyme activator activity; protein binding; protein kinase binding; phosphatase regulator activity; enzyme inhibitor activity
Cellular component	cytoplasm; cytosol; A band; Z discdkac; nucleoplasm; cytoskeleton
Biological process	regulation of muscle contraction; positive regulation of catalytic activity; signal transduction; regulation of catalytic activity; negative regulation of catalytic activity; G2/M transition of mitotic cell cycle
Sources:Amigo / QuickGO
Orthologs
Databases	NCBI: entry; OMA: entry
Species	Human	Mouse
Entrez	4660	329251
Ensembl	ENSG00000077157	ENSMUSG00000073557
UniProt	O60237	Q8BG95
RefSeq (mRNA)	NM_001167857; NM_001167858; NM_001197131; NM_002481; NM_032103 NM_032104; NM_032105; NM_001331029	NM_001081307; NM_001368827; NM_001368829
RefSeq (protein)	NP_001161329; NP_001161330; NP_001184060; NP_001317958; NP_002472 NP_115286; NP_115287	NP_001074776; NP_001355756; NP_001355758
Location (UCSC)	Chr 1: 202.35 – 202.59 Mb	Chr 1: 134.68 – 134.88 Mb
PubMed search
- Wikidata
View/Edit Human	View/Edit Mouse

Protein phosphatase 1 regulatory subunit 12B is an enzyme that in humans is encoded by the PPP1R12B gene.

Myosin light chain phosphatase (MLCP) consists of three subunits- catalytic subunit, large subunit/myosin binding subunit (MBS) and small subunit (sm-M20). This gene is a multi-functional gene which encodes both MBS and sm-M20. MLCP regulates myosins and the dephosphorylation is enhanced by the presence of MBS. The sm-M20 is suggested to play a regulatory role in muscle contraction by binding to MBS. MBS is also encoded by another gene, myosin light chain phosphatase target subunit 1. sm-M20 shows higher binding affinity to this gene product than to myosin light chain phosphatase target subunit 2-MBS even though the two MBS proteins are highly similar. Although both MBSs increase the activity of MLCP, myosin light chain phosphatase target subunit 1-MBS is a more efficient activator. There are four alternatively spliced transcript variants described; two alter the MBS coding region and two alter the sm-M20 coding region of this gene.

== Interactions ==
PPP1R12B has been shown to interact with Interleukin 16.
