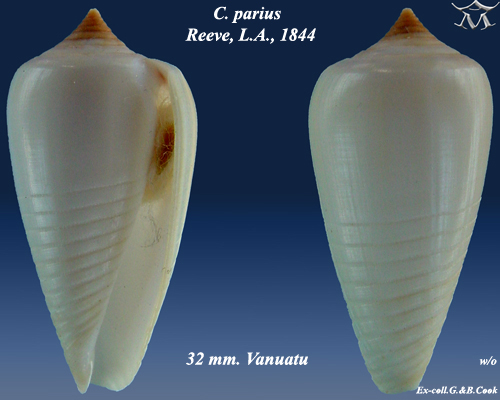
- Apertural and abapertural views of shell of Conus parius Reeve, L.A., 1844
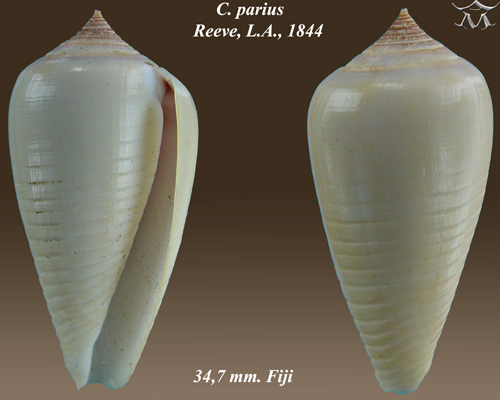

Conservation status
- Least Concern (IUCN 3.1)

Scientific classification
- Kingdom: Animalia
- Phylum: Mollusca
- Class: Gastropoda
- Subclass: Caenogastropoda
- Order: Neogastropoda
- Superfamily: Conoidea
- Family: Conidae
- Genus: Conus
- Species: C. parius

Binomial name
- Conus parius Reeve, 1844

Synonyms
- Conus (Phasmoconus) parius Reeve, 1844 · accepted, alternate representation; Graphiconus parius (Reeve, 1844); Phasmoconus parius (Reeve, 1844)

= Conus parius =

Species of sea snail

Conus parius, common name the Parian cone, is a species of sea snail, a marine gastropod mollusk in the family Conidae, the cone snails and their allies.

Like all species within the genus Conus, these snails are predatory and venomous. They are capable of stinging humans, therefore live ones should be handled carefully or not at all.

== Description ==
The size of the shell varies between 25 mm and 46 mm. The color of the shell is white to pale yellowish, often longitudinally indistinctly marked with deeper coloring. The spire is striate. The lower part of the body whorl is distantly sulcate.

Conantokin-Pr1, -Pr2 and -Pr3 are toxins derived from the venom of Conus parius. These small neurotoxic peptides have been found to act as NMDA antagonists in vitro, and stimulate production of the transcription factor CREB in the brain.

== Distribution ==
This marine species occurs off the Philippines and Indonesia; off Papua New Guinea, the Solomon Islands and Vanuatu
