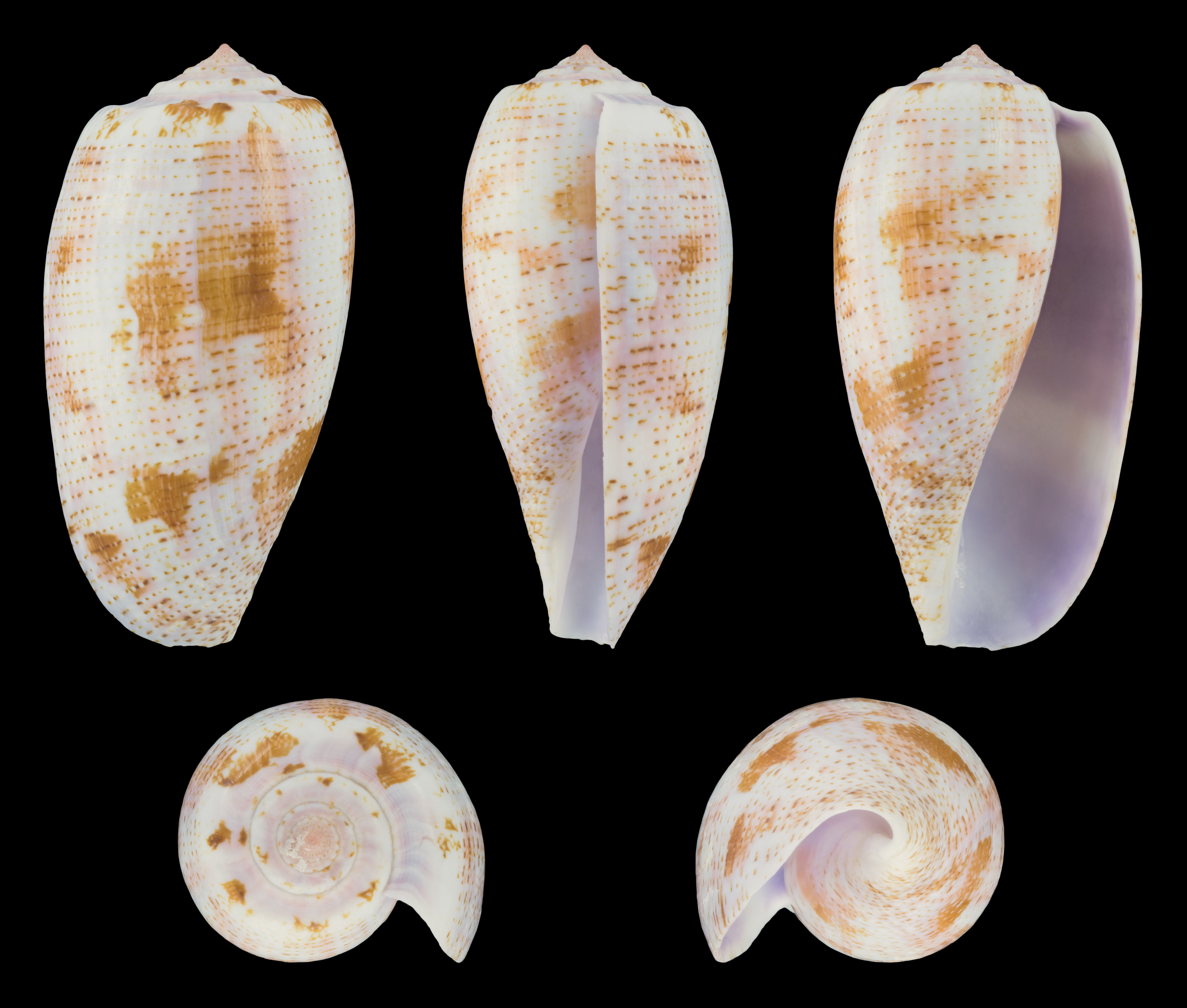
- Five views of shell of Conus tulipa Linnaeus, C., 1758

Conservation status
- Least Concern (IUCN 3.1)

Scientific classification
- Kingdom: Animalia
- Phylum: Mollusca
- Class: Gastropoda
- Subclass: Caenogastropoda
- Order: Neogastropoda
- Superfamily: Conoidea
- Family: Conidae
- Genus: Conus
- Species: C. tulipa

Binomial name
- Conus tulipa Linnaeus, 1758

Synonyms
- Chelyconus borbonicus Adams, H.G., 1868; Conus (Gastridium) tulipa Linnaeus, 1758 · accepted, alternate representation; Conus borbonicus H. Adams, 1868; Coronaxis nebulosa Swainson, 1840 (invalid: secondary junior homonym of Conus nebulosus Gmelin, 1791); Cucullus purpureus Röding, 1798; Gastridium tulipa (Linnaeus, 1758)

= Conus tulipa =

Species of sea snail

Conus tulipa, common name the tulip cone, is a species of sea snail, a marine gastropod mollusk in the family Conidae, the cone snails and their allies.

Like all species within the genus Conus, these snails are predatory and venomous. They are capable of stinging humans, therefore live ones should be handled carefully.

A class of conopeptides named rho-TIA was discovered in Conus tulipa in 2001. This class of conopeptides targets (react with) alpha1-adrenergic receptors.

== Description ==
The size of the shell varies between 45 mm and 95 mm. The shell is variegated with violet and white, clouded with chestnut, with numerous revolving rows of minute chestnut and white articulations. The interior of the aperture is violaceous.

Conantokin-T is a toxin derived from the venom of Conus tulipa.

== Distribution ==
The marine species occurs in the Indo-Western Pacific.

- Madagascar
- Mauritius
- Tanzania
- India
- the Philippines
- Queensland (Australia)

== Feeding habits ==
Conus tulipa preys on fishes.

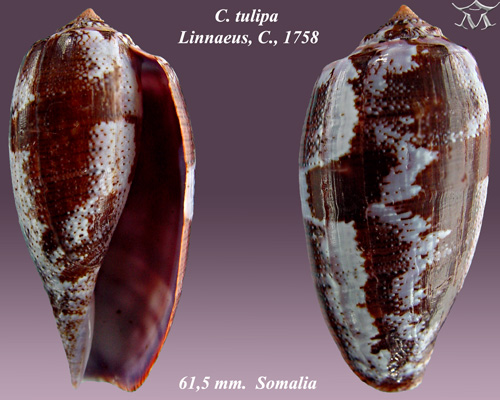
Conus tulipa Linnaeus, C., 1758

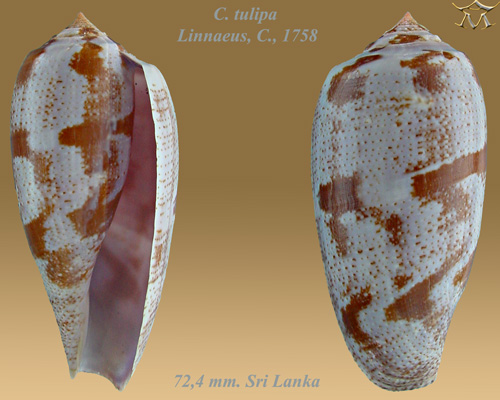
Conus tulipa Linnaeus, C., 1758

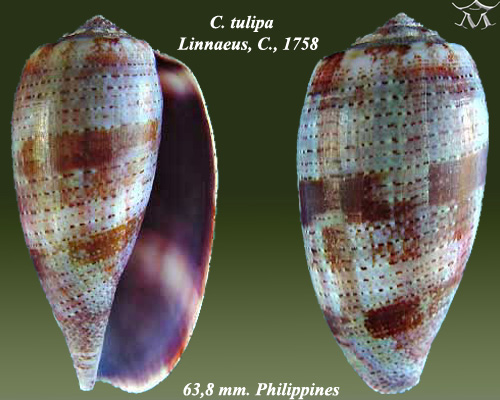
Conus tulipa Linnaeus, C., 1758
