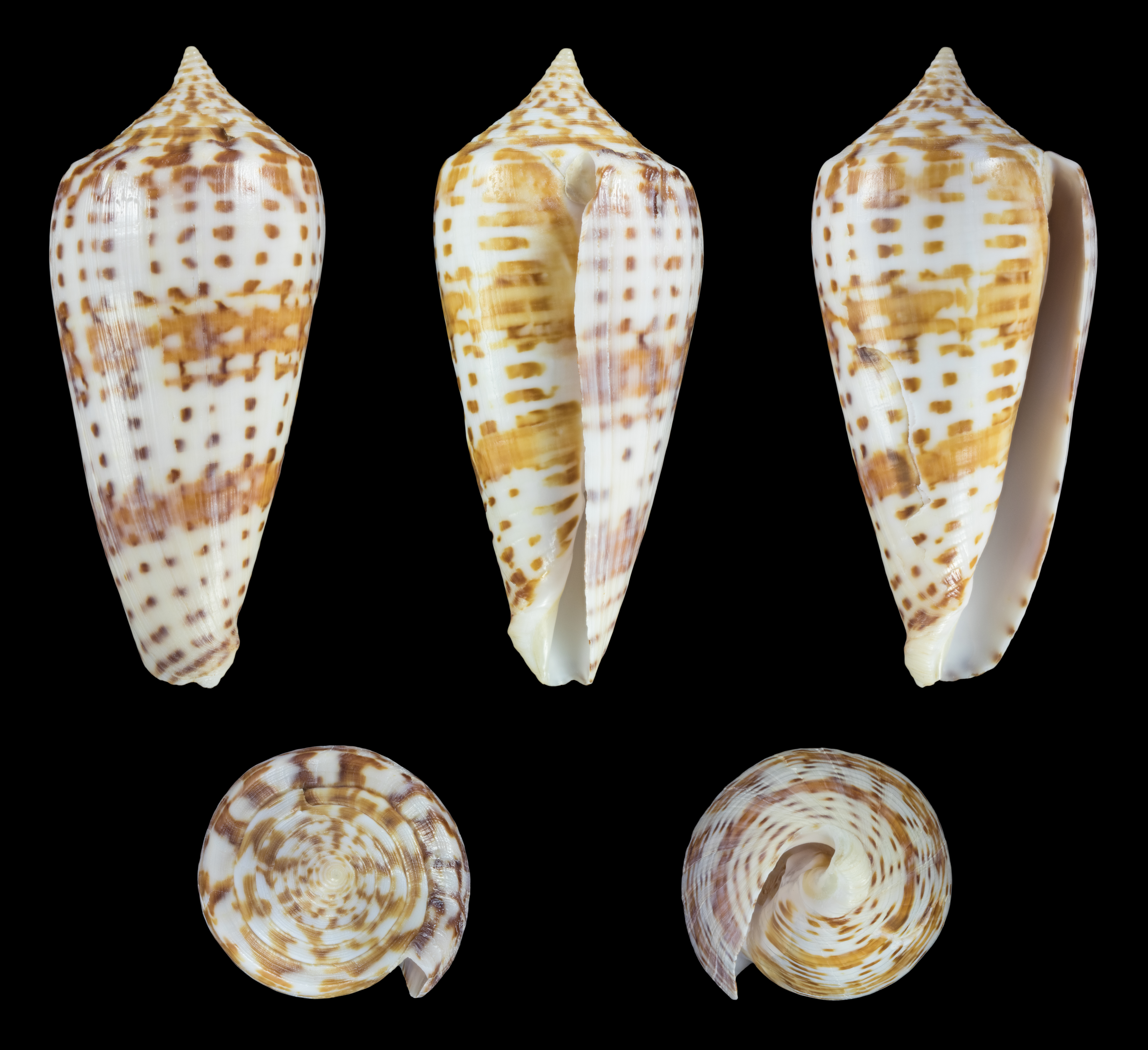
- Conus lynceus

Scientific classification
- Kingdom: Animalia
- Phylum: Mollusca
- Class: Gastropoda
- Subclass: Caenogastropoda
- Order: Neogastropoda
- Family: Conidae
- Genus: Conus
- Species: C. lynceus

Binomial name
- Conus lynceus Sowerby II, 1858

Synonyms
- Asprella lyncea (G.B. Sowerby II, 1858); Conus (Phasmoconus) lynceus Sowerby II, 1858 · accepted, alternate representation; Graphiconus lynceus (G. B. Sowerby II, 1858)

= Conus lynceus =

Species of sea snail

Conus lynceus, the lynceus cone, is a species of predatory sea snail, a marine gastropod mollusk in the family Conidae, the cone snails, cone shells or cones.

Like all species within the genus Conus, these snails are predatory and venomous. They are capable of stinging humans, therefore live ones should be handled carefully or not at all.

== Description ==
Conantokin-L is a toxin derived from the venom of Conus lynceus.

== Distribution ==
This is an Indo-Pacific species found along Taiwan, the Philippines, Java, Solomon Islands, Queensland, Australia.

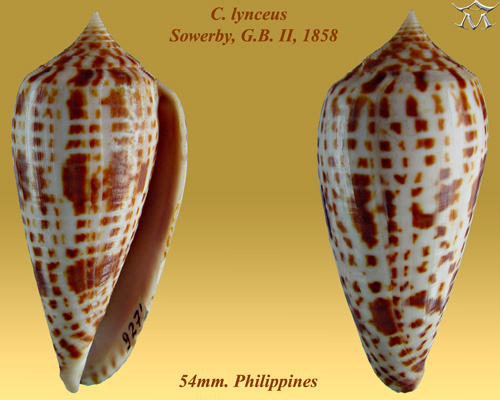
Conus lynceus Sowerby, G.B. II, 1858

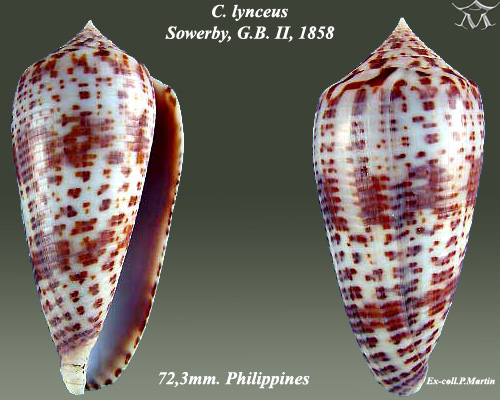
Conus lynceus Sowerby, G.B. II, 1858

== Shell description ==
The size of an adult shell varies between 50 mm and 89 mm. The shell is somewhat swollen, distantly sulcate below, otherwise smooth. The shell is white with encircled by chestnut spots, clouds, and oblique and triangular markings. It has a very pointed, maculated spire.
