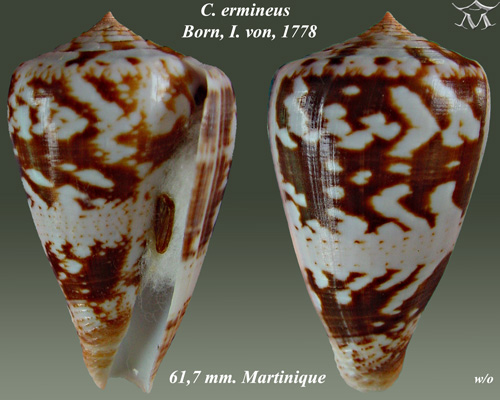
- Apertural and abapertural views of shell of Conus ermineus Born, I. von, 1778

Conservation status
- Least Concern (IUCN 3.1)

Scientific classification
- Kingdom: Animalia
- Phylum: Mollusca
- Class: Gastropoda
- Subclass: Caenogastropoda
- Order: Neogastropoda
- Superfamily: Conoidea
- Family: Conidae
- Genus: Conus
- Species: C. ermineus

Binomial name
- Conus ermineus Born, 1778

Synonyms
- Chelyconus ermineus (Born, 1778); Conus (Chelyconus) ermineus Born, 1778 · accepted, alternate representation; Conus aspersus G. B. Sowerby II, 1833; Conus caerulans Küster, 1838; Conus coerulescens Schröter, 1803; Conus eques Hwass in Bruguière, 1792; Conus grayi Reeve, 1844; Conus inquinatus Reeve, 1849; Conus leaeneus Link, 1807; Conus luzonicus Hwass in Bruguière, 1792; Conus narcissus Lamarck, 1810; Conus oculatus Gmelin, 1791; Conus perryae Clench, 1942; Conus portoricanus Hwass in Bruguière, 1792; Conus rudis Weinkauff, 1873; Conus testudinarius Hwass in Bruguière, 1792; Conus verrucosus piraticus Clench, 1942; Cucullus barathrum Röding, 1798; Cucullus crucifer Röding, 1798; Cucullus cutisanguina Röding, 1798

= Conus ermineus =

Species of sea snail

Conus ermineus, common name the turtle cone, is a species of sea snail, a marine gastropod mollusc in the family Conidae, the cone snails and their allies.

Like all species within the genus Conus, these snails are predatory and venomous. They are capable of stinging humans, therefore live ones should be handled carefully or not at all.

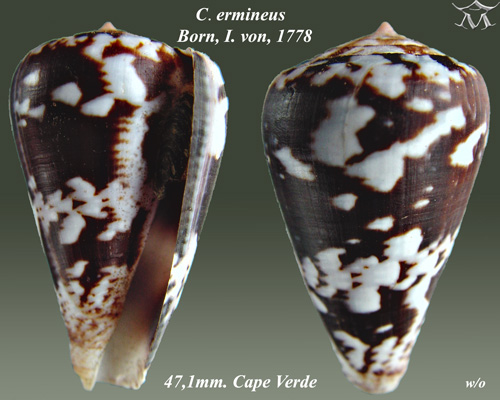
Conus ermineus Born, I. von, 1778

== Distribution ==
This species occurs in the Caribbean Sea and the Gulf of Mexico to South America; in the Atlantic Ocean off West Africa and the Cape Verdes; in the Indian Ocean off Tanzania.

== Description ==
The maximum recorded shell length is 103 mm.

Conantokin-E is a toxin derived from the venom of Conus ermineus.

It is a fishing eating species. Utilizes specialized hollow harpoon like radula tooth to harpoon small fish and paralyze them with venom to facilitate swallowing.

== Habitat ==
Minimum recorded depth is 0 m. Maximum recorded depth is 101 m.

Fresh-dead, crabbed shells are known from traps set at 150 metres depth: West coast Barbados.

== Venom ==
Conus ermineus is a venomous species and capable of stinging humans, so it should be treated with caution. A delta-conotoxin (delta-EVIA) isolated from the venom of C. ermineus inhibits the inactivation of vertebrate Na + neural channels.

== Gallery ==
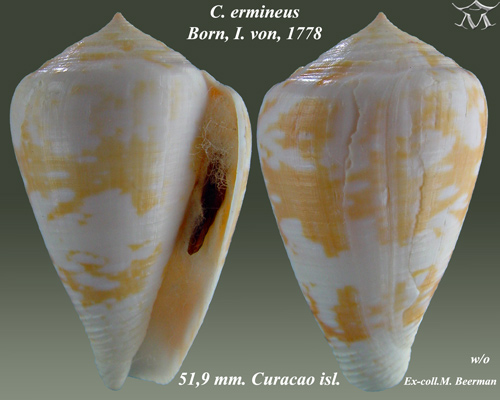
Conus ermineus Born, I. von, 1778

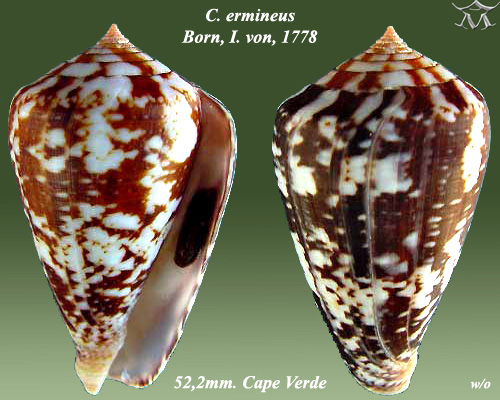
Conus ermineus Born, I. von, 1778

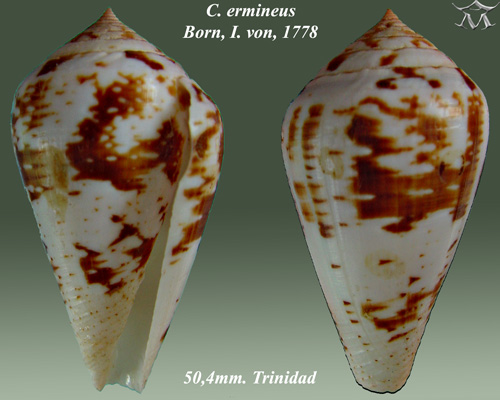
Conus ermineus Born, I. von, 1778
