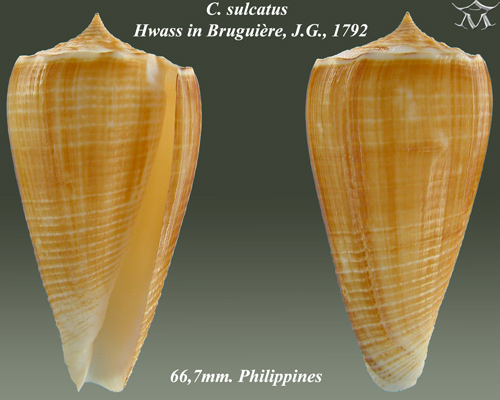
- Apertural and abapertural views of shell of Conus sulcatus Hwass in Bruguière, J.G., 1792
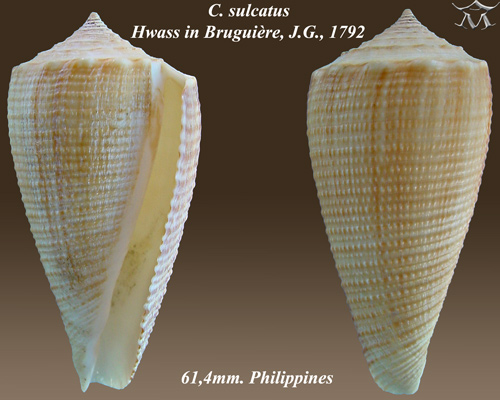

Conservation status
- Least Concern (IUCN 3.1)

Scientific classification
- Kingdom: Animalia
- Phylum: Mollusca
- Class: Gastropoda
- Subclass: Caenogastropoda
- Order: Neogastropoda
- Superfamily: Conoidea
- Family: Conidae
- Genus: Conus
- Species: C. sulcatus

Binomial name
- Conus sulcatus Hwass in Bruguière, 1792

Synonyms
- Asprella sulcata (Hwass in Bruguière, 1792) · accepted, alternate representation; Conus (Asprella) sulcatus Hwass in Bruguière, 1792 · accepted, alternate representation; Conus asper Lamarck, 1810; Conus bocki G. B. Sowerby III, 1881; Conus brettinghami Coomans, Moolenbeek & Wils, 1982; Conus costatus Holten, 1802 (invalid: junior homonym of Conus costatus Gmelin, 1791); Conus orbitatus Reeve, 1843; Conus samiae da Motta, 1982; Conus undulatus G. B. Sowerby II, 1858 (Invalid: junior homonym of Conus undulatus [Lightfoot], 1786; C. brettinghami Coomans et al., 1982, is a replacement name)

= Conus sulcatus =

Species of sea snail

Conus sulcatus, common name the grooved shell, is a species of sea snail, a marine gastropod mollusk in the family Conidae, the cone snails and their allies.

Like all species within the genus Conus, these snails are predatory and venomous. They are capable of stinging humans, therefore live ones should be handled carefully or not at all.

== Description ==
The size of the shell varies between 21 mm and 89 mm. The smooth shell shows revolving grooves crossed by longitudinal striae. The intermediate ridges are flat or rounded. The short spire is carinated, striate, sometimes with distant compressed tubercles. The ground color of the shell is light yellowish brown, or whitish.

Conantokin-Br is a toxin derived from the venom of Conus sulcatus.

== Distribution ==
This marine species occurs off Japan, Taiwan, in the Bay of Bengal and off the Solomon Islands, New Caledonia and Queensland, Australia.
