= GRIN2C =

Protein-coding gene in the species Homo sapiens

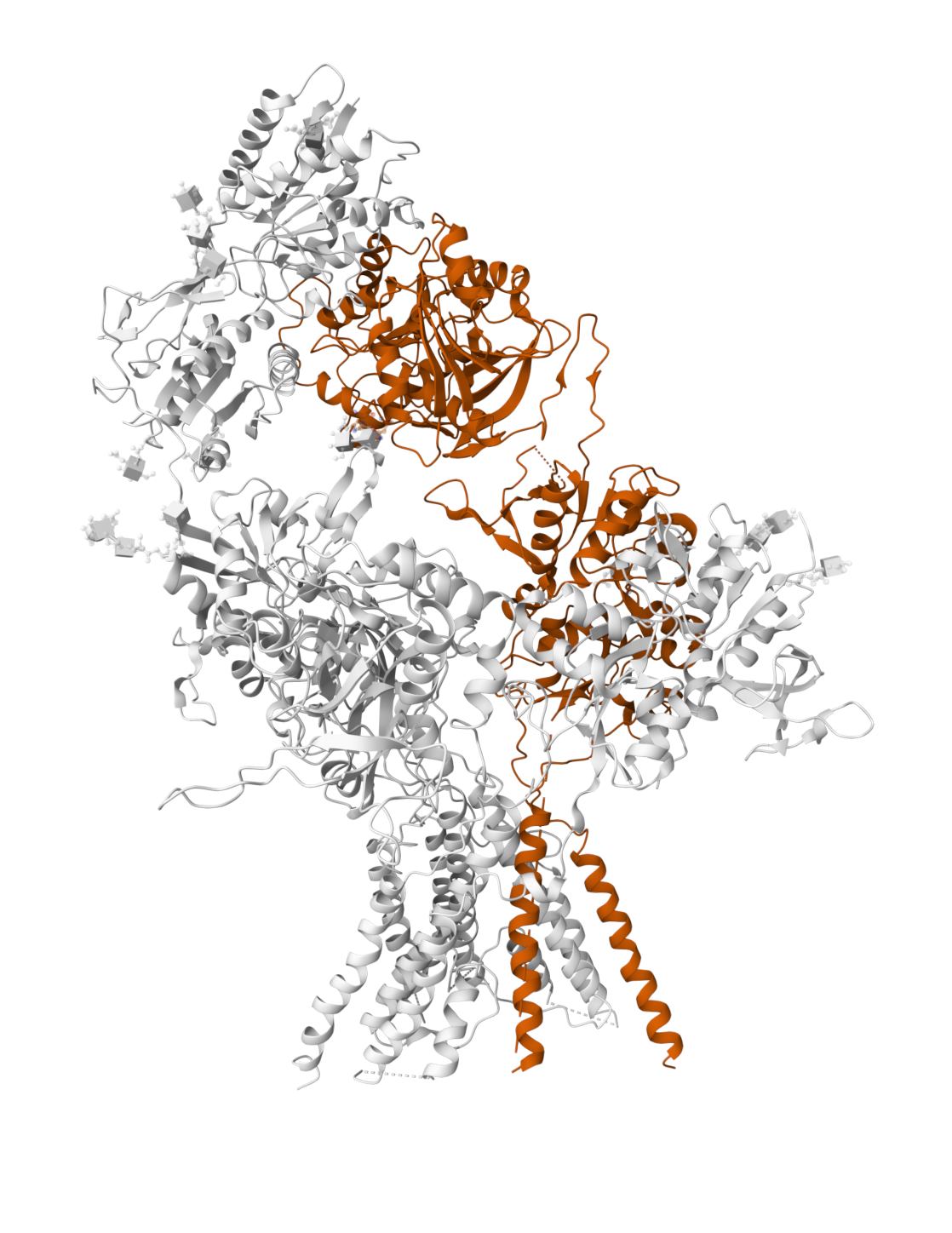

Identifiers
- Aliases: GRIN2C, GluN2C, NMDAR2C, NR2C, glutamate ionotropic receptor NMDA type subunit 2C
- External IDs: OMIM: 138254; MGI: 95822; GeneCards: GRIN2C

Gene location (Human)
Chr.	Chromosome 17 (human)
Band	17q25.1	Start	74,842,023 bp
Band	17q25.1	End	74,861,504 bp

Gene location (Mouse)
Chr.	Chromosome 11 (mouse)
Band	11 E2|11 80.8 cM	Start	115,139,995 bp
Band	11 E2|11 80.8 cM	End	115,158,069 bp
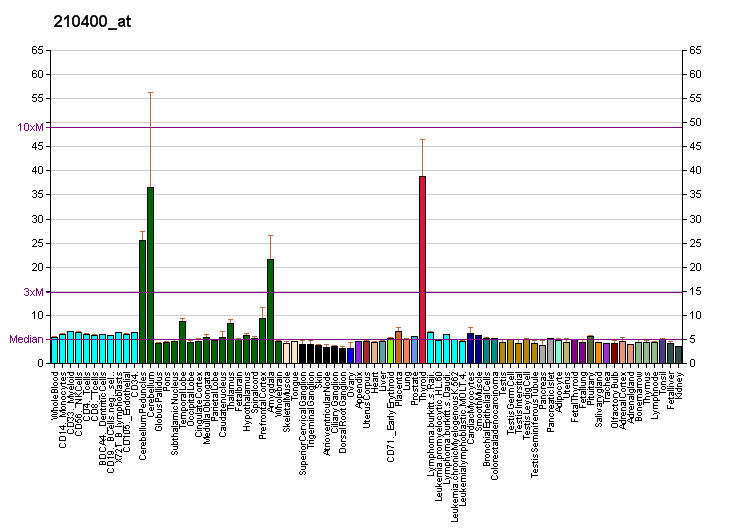
RNA expression pattern
Bgee	Human / Mouse (ortholog); Top expressed in: right hemisphere of cerebellum; paraflocculus of cerebellum; cerebellar vermis; parotid gland; right auricle of heart; putamen; right lobe of thyroid gland; amygdala; caudate nucleus; right frontal lobe / Top expressed in: lobe of cerebellum; cerebellar vermis; entorhinal cortex; perirhinal cortex; CA3 field; medial dorsal nucleus; visual cortex; granular layer; choroid plexus of fourth ventricle; lateral geniculate nucleus; More reference expression data
BioGPS	More reference expression data
Gene ontology
Molecular function	ion channel activity; protein binding; ionotropic glutamate receptor activity; cation channel activity; extracellularly glutamate-gated ion channel activity; NMDA glutamate receptor activity; glutamate-gated calcium ion channel activity; signaling receptor activity; transmitter-gated ion channel activity involved in regulation of postsynaptic membrane potential
Cellular component	integral component of membrane; postsynaptic membrane; membrane; postsynaptic density; plasma membrane; synapse; cell junction; intracellular anatomical structure; integral component of plasma membrane; NMDA selective glutamate receptor complex; postsynaptic density membrane; glutamatergic synapse
Biological process	protein localization; glutamate receptor signaling pathway; neuromuscular process controlling balance; negative regulation of protein catabolic process; regulation of membrane potential; directional locomotion; ion transport; MAPK cascade; ionotropic glutamate receptor signaling pathway; response to wounding; excitatory postsynaptic potential; calcium-mediated signaling; calcium ion transmembrane import into cytosol; regulation of molecular function; transport; brain development; regulation of synaptic plasticity; long-term potentiation; excitatory chemical synaptic transmission; protein localization to postsynaptic membrane
Sources:Amigo / QuickGO
Orthologs
Databases	NCBI: entry; OMA: entry
Species	Human	Mouse
Entrez	2905	14813
Ensembl	ENSG00000161509	ENSMUSG00000020734
UniProt	Q14957	Q01098
RefSeq (mRNA)	NM_000835; NM_001278553	NM_010350
RefSeq (protein)	NP_000826; NP_001265482	NP_034480
Location (UCSC)	Chr 17: 74.84 – 74.86 Mb	Chr 11: 115.14 – 115.16 Mb
PubMed search
- Wikidata
View/Edit Human	View/Edit Mouse

Glutamate [NMDA] receptor subunit epsilon-3 is a protein that in humans is encoded by the GRIN2C gene.

== Function ==
N-methyl-D-aspartate (NMDA) receptors are a class of ionotropic glutamate receptors. NMDA channel has been shown to be involved in long-term potentiation, an activity-dependent increase in the efficiency of synaptic transmission thought to underlie certain kinds of memory and learning. NMDA receptor channels are heteromers composed of the key receptor subunit NMDAR1 (GRIN1) and 1 or more of the 4 NMDAR2 subunits: NMDAR2A (GRIN2A), NMDAR2B (GRIN2B), NMDAR2C (GRIN2C), and NMDAR2D (GRIN2D).

== Interactions ==
GRIN2C has been shown to interact with DLG4 and DLG3.

== See also ==
- Glutamate receptor
- NMDA receptor
