= Conus rolani =

- A shell of Conus rolani

Conservation status
- Least Concern (IUCN 3.1)

Scientific classification
- Kingdom: Animalia
- Phylum: Mollusca
- Class: Gastropoda
- Subclass: Caenogastropoda
- Order: Neogastropoda
- Superfamily: Conoidea
- Family: Conidae
- Genus: Conus
- Species: C. rolani

Binomial name
- Conus rolani Röckel, 1986

Synonyms
- Asprella rolani (Röckel, 1986); Conus (Asprella) rolani Röckel, 1986 · accepted, alternate representation; Phasmoconus rolani (Röckel, 1986)

Species of sea snail

Conus rolani, common name Rolan's cone, is a species of sea snail, a marine gastropod mollusk in the family Conidae, the cone snails and their allies.

Like all species within the genus Conus, these snails are predatory and venomous. They are capable of stinging humans, therefore live ones should be handled carefully or not at all.

== Description ==
The size of the shell varies between 37 mm and 70 mm.

Conantokin-R1-A is a toxin derived from the venom of Conus rolani.

This sea snail has recently been studied regarding its venom's toxic compounds that can replace the pain-killing effect of morphine.

== Distribution ==
This marine species occurs off Taiwan and Papua New Guinea.

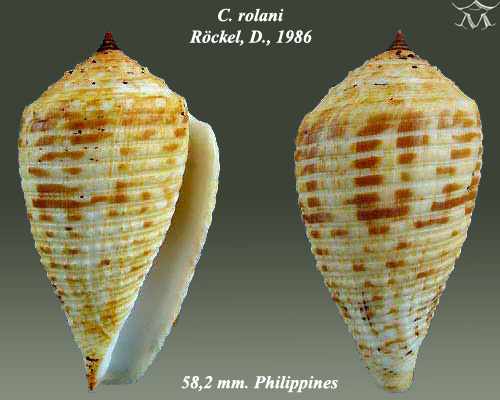
Conus rolani Röckel, D., 1986

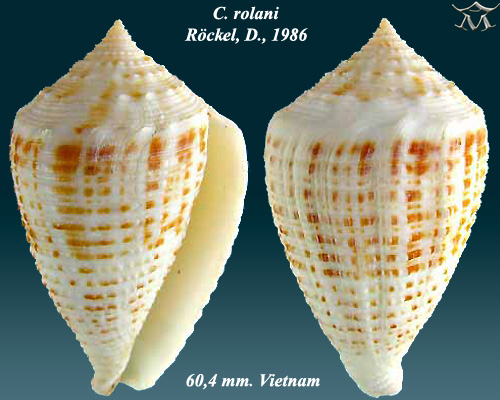
Conus rolani Röckel, D., 1986
