= Interleukin 16 =

Protein-coding gene in the species Homo sapiens

IL16
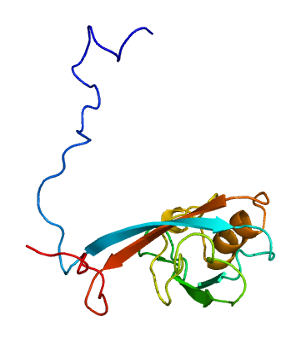

Identifiers
- Aliases: IL16, LCF, NPRprIL-16, IL-16, interleukin 16
- External IDs: OMIM: 603035; MGI: 1270855; GeneCards: IL16
Available structures
PDB	Ortholog search: PDBe RCSB
PDB	List of PDB id codes 1I16, 1X6D, 5FB8

Gene location (Human)
Chr.	Chromosome 15 (human)
Band	15q25.1	Start	81,159,575 bp
Band	15q25.1	End	81,314,058 bp

Gene location (Mouse)
Chr.	Chromosome 7 (mouse)
Band	7 D3|7 47.43 cM	Start	83,292,033 bp
Band	7 D3|7 47.43 cM	End	83,394,934 bp
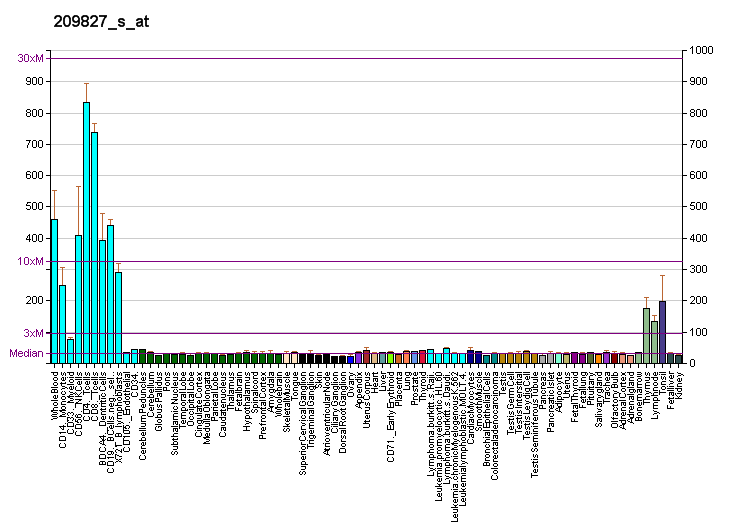

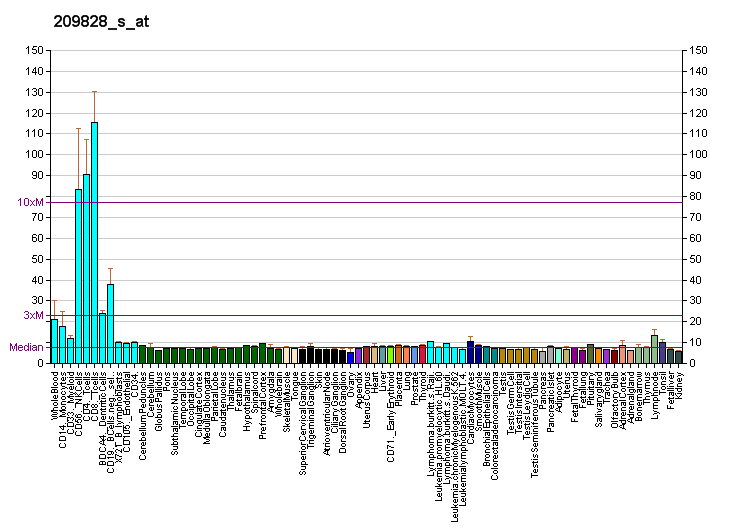
RNA expression pattern
Bgee	Human / Mouse (ortholog); Top expressed in: granulocyte; blood; bone marrow cell; appendix; spleen; monocyte; lymph node; cerebellar hemisphere; right hemisphere of cerebellum; tendon of biceps brachii / Top expressed in: pharynx; granulocyte; thymus; spleen; blood; tibiofemoral joint; mesenteric lymph nodes; sciatic nerve; cerebellar cortex; dentate gyrus of hippocampal formation granule cell; More reference expression data
BioGPS	More reference expression data
Gene ontology
Molecular function	cytokine activity; CD4 receptor binding
Cellular component	plasma membrane; intracellular anatomical structure; extracellular region; extracellular space; nucleus; cytoplasm; cytosol; nuclear speck
Biological process	induction of positive chemotaxis; chemotaxis; viral process; regulation of transcription, DNA-templated; leukocyte chemotaxis; immune response; transcription, DNA-templated; regulation of calcium ion transport; regulation of signaling receptor activity; cytokine-mediated signaling pathway; signal transduction
Sources:Amigo / QuickGO
Orthologs
Databases	NCBI: entry; OMA: entry
Species	Human	Mouse
Entrez	3603	16170
Ensembl	ENSG00000172349	ENSMUSG00000001741
UniProt	Q14005	O54824
RefSeq (mRNA)	NM_001172128; NM_004513; NM_172217; NM_001352684; NM_001352685 NM_001352686	NM_010551; NM_001360087; NM_001360088; NM_001360089
RefSeq (protein)	NP_001165599; NP_004504; NP_757366; NP_001339613; NP_001339614 NP_001339615	NP_034681; NP_001347016; NP_001347017; NP_001347018
Location (UCSC)	Chr 15: 81.16 – 81.31 Mb	Chr 7: 83.29 – 83.39 Mb
PubMed search
- Wikidata
View/Edit Human	View/Edit Mouse

Interleukin 16 is a pro-inflammatory pleiotropic cytokine. Its precursor, pro-interleukin-16 is a protein that in humans is encoded by the IL16 gene. This gene was discovered in 1982 at Boston University by Dr. David Center and Dr. William Cruikshank.

== Function ==
The cytokine encoded by this gene is a pleiotropic cytokine that functions as a chemoattractant, a modulator of T cell activation, and an inhibitor of HIV replication. The signaling process of this cytokine is mediated by CD4. The product of this gene undergoes proteolytic processing, which is found to yield two functional proteins. The cytokine function is exclusively attributed to the secreted C-terminal peptide, while the N-terminal product may play a role in cell cycle control. Caspase 3 is reported to be involved in the proteolytic processing of this protein. Two alternatively spliced transcript variants encoding distinct isoforms have been reported. Interleukin 16 (IL-16) is released by a variety of cells (including lymphocytes and some epithelial cells) that has been characterized as a chemoattractant for certain immune cells expressing the cell surface molecule CD4. IL-16 was originally described as a factor that could attract activated T cells in humans, it was previously called lymphocyte chemoattractant factor (LCF). Since then, this interleukin has been shown to recruit and activate many other cells expressing the CD4 molecule, including monocytes, eosinophils, and dendritic cells.

The structure of IL-16 was determined following its cloning in 1994. This cytokine is produced as a precursor peptide (pro-IL-16) that requires processing by an enzyme called caspase-3 to become active. CD4 is the cell signaling receptor for mature IL-16.

== Interactions ==
Interleukin 16 has been shown to interact with:

- GRIN2A,
- GRIN2D,
- KCNJ10,
- KCNJ15,
- Kir2.1,
- PPP1R12A, and
- PPP1R12B.
