= GRIN2A =

Protein-coding gene in the species Homo sapiens

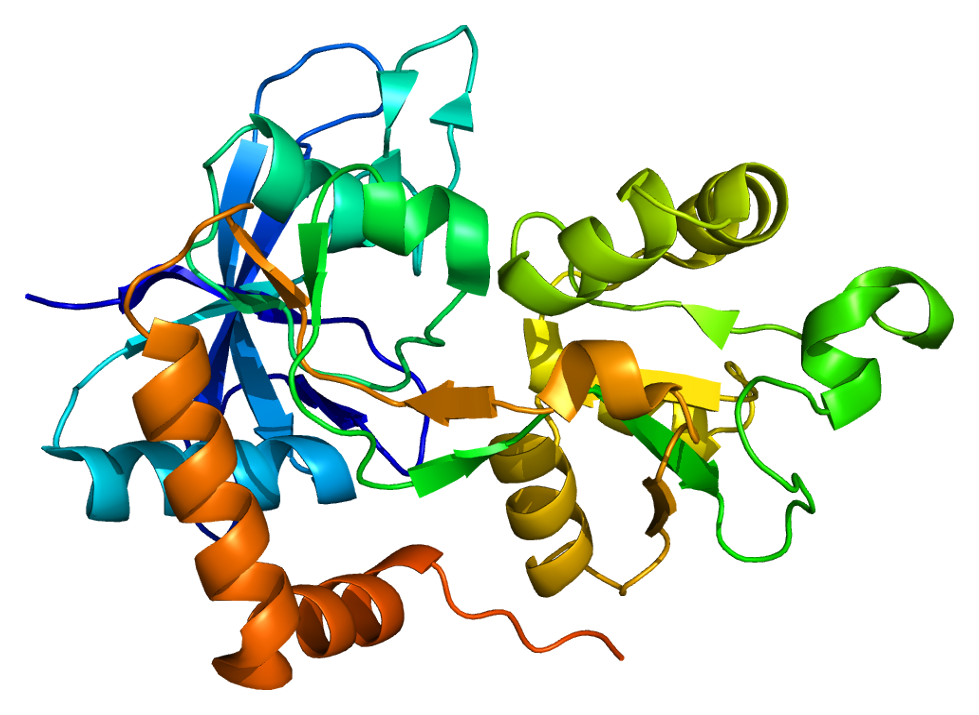

Identifiers
- Aliases: GRIN2A, EPND, FESD, GluN2A, LKS, NMDAR2A, NR2A, glutamate ionotropic receptor NMDA type subunit 2A
- External IDs: OMIM: 138253; MGI: 95820; GeneCards: GRIN2A
Available structures
| PDB | Ortholog search: PDBe RCSB |
| PDB | List of PDB id codes 3NFL, 5H8Q, 5H8H, 5H8N, 5H8F, 5I2N, 5I2K, 5KDT, 5KCJ |

Gene location (Human)
| Chr. | Chromosome 16 (human) |
| Band | 16p13.2 | Start | 9,753,404 bp |
| Band | 16p13.2 | End | 10,182,928 bp |

Gene location (Mouse)
| Chr. | Chromosome 16 (mouse) |
| Band | 16 A1|16 5.28 cM | Start | 9,385,762 bp |
| Band | 16 A1|16 5.28 cM | End | 9,813,424 bp |
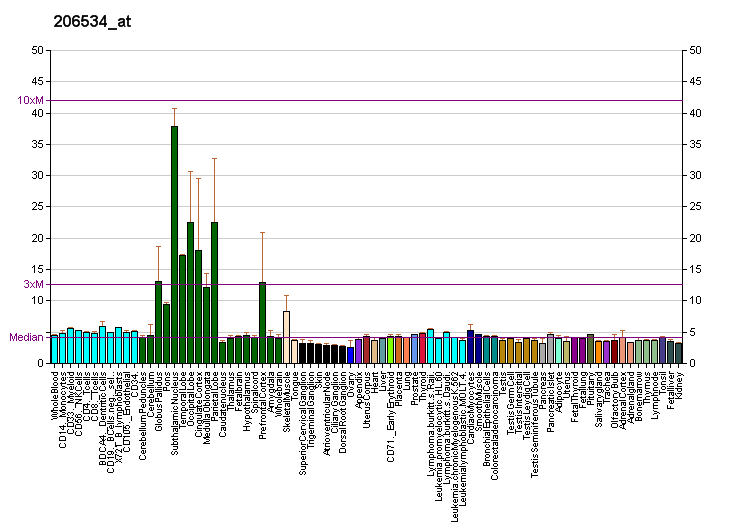
RNA expression pattern
| Bgee | Human / Mouse (ortholog); Top expressed in: Brodmann area 23; endothelial cell; middle temporal gyrus; postcentral gyrus; lateral nuclear group of thalamus; superior frontal gyrus; primary visual cortex; entorhinal cortex; frontal pole; Brodmann area 46 / Top expressed in: Region I of hippocampus proper; primary motor cortex; subiculum; prefrontal cortex; lumbar subsegment of spinal cord; olfactory tubercle; hippocampus proper; piriform cortex; dentate gyrus; temporal lobe; More reference expression data |
| BioGPS | More reference expression data |
Gene ontology
| Molecular function | calcium channel activity; zinc ion binding; NMDA glutamate receptor activity; metal ion binding; ion channel activity; protein binding; ionotropic glutamate receptor activity; cation channel activity; extracellularly glutamate-gated ion channel activity; amyloid-beta binding; glutamate-gated calcium ion channel activity; signaling receptor activity |
| Cellular component | integral component of membrane; postsynaptic membrane; membrane; synaptic vesicle; postsynaptic density; plasma membrane; synapse; integral component of plasma membrane; NMDA selective glutamate receptor complex; cell surface; cell junction; endoplasmic reticulum; neuron projection; presynaptic membrane; postsynaptic density membrane; integral component of postsynaptic density membrane; synaptic membrane; glutamatergic synapse; cell projection; dendritic spine |
| Biological process | visual learning; protein localization; glutamate receptor signaling pathway; neurogenesis; startle response; regulation of sensory perception of pain; positive regulation of long-term synaptic potentiation; negative regulation of protein catabolic process; response to amphetamine; regulation of membrane potential; directional locomotion; modulation of chemical synaptic transmission; memory; serotonin metabolic process; ion transport; learning; cation transmembrane transport; MAPK cascade; regulation of synaptic plasticity; sleep; dopamine metabolic process; ionotropic glutamate receptor signaling pathway; response to wounding; calcium ion transmembrane transport; locomotion; regulation of postsynaptic membrane potential; excitatory postsynaptic potential; learning or memory; positive regulation of apoptotic process; sensory perception of pain; response to ethanol; calcium ion transport; long-term potentiation; chemical synaptic transmission; positive regulation of GTPase activity; ion transmembrane transport; regulation of ion transmembrane transport; transport; brain development; calcium-mediated signaling; activation of cysteine-type endopeptidase activity; calcium ion transmembrane import into cytosol; excitatory chemical synaptic transmission; protein localization to postsynaptic membrane; cellular response to amyloid-beta; regulation of NMDA receptor activity |
Sources:Amigo / QuickGO
Orthologs
| Databases | NCBI: entry; OMA: entry |
| Species | Human | Mouse |
| Entrez | 2903 | 14811 |
| Ensembl | ENSG00000183454 | ENSMUSG00000059003 |
| UniProt | Q12879 | P35436 |
| RefSeq (mRNA) | NM_000833; NM_001134407; NM_001134408 | NM_008170 |
| RefSeq (protein) | NP_000824; NP_001127879; NP_001127880 | NP_032196 |
| Location (UCSC) | Chr 16: 9.75 – 10.18 Mb | Chr 16: 9.39 – 9.81 Mb |
| PubMed search |
- Wikidata
| View/Edit Human | View/Edit Mouse |

Glutamate Receptor Ionotropic, [NMDA] subunit epsilon-1 is a protein that in humans is encoded by the GRIN2A gene. With 1464 amino acids, the canonical GluN2A subunit isoform is large. GluN2A-short isoforms specific to primates can be produced by alternative splicing and contain 1281 amino acids.

== Function ==
N-methyl-D-aspartate (NMDA) receptors are a class of ionotropic glutamate receptors. NMDA channel has been shown to be involved in long-term potentiation, an activity-dependent increase in the efficiency of synaptic transmission thought to underlie certain kinds of memory and learning. NMDA receptor channels are heteromers composed of the key receptor subunit NMDAR1 (GRIN1) and 1 or more of the 4 NMDAR2 subunits: NMDAR2A (GRIN2A), NMDAR2B (GRIN2B), NMDAR2C (GRIN2C), and NMDAR2D (GRIN2D).

== Clinical significance ==
Variants of the gene are associated with the protective effect of coffee on Parkinson's disease.

Mutations in GRIN2A are associated to refractory epilepsy.

Whole exome/genome sequencing has led to the discovery of an association between mutations in GRIN2A and a wide variety of neurological diseases, including epilepsy, intellectual disability, autism spectrum disorders, developmental delay, and schizophrenia.

== Interactions ==
GRIN2A has been shown to interact with:

- DLG1
- DLG3
- DLG4
- FYN
- Interleukin 16
- PTK2B
- Src

== See also ==
- Glutamate receptor
- NMDA receptor
