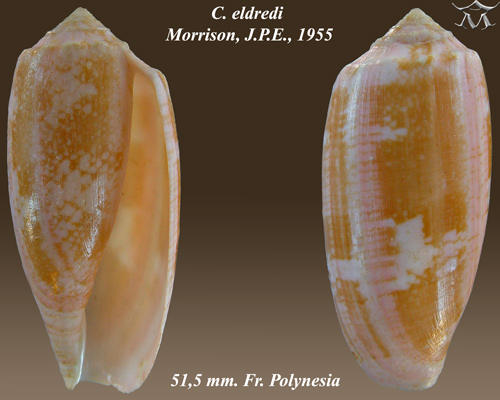
- Apertural and abapertural views of shell of Conus eldredi Morrison, J.P.E., 1955

Conservation status
- Data Deficient (IUCN 3.1)

Scientific classification
- Kingdom: Animalia
- Phylum: Mollusca
- Class: Gastropoda
- Subclass: Caenogastropoda
- Order: Neogastropoda
- Superfamily: Conoidea
- Family: Conidae
- Genus: Conus
- Species: C. eldredi

Binomial name
- Conus eldredi Morrison, 1955

Synonyms
- Conus (Gastridium) eldredi Morrison, 1955 · accepted, alternate representation; Conus geographus var. rosea G. B. Sowerby II, 1833 (invalid: junior homonym of Conus roseus Fischer von Waldheim, 1807, and C. roseus Lamarck, 1810); Conus intermedius Reeve, 1843 (invalid: junior homonym of Conus intermedius Lamarck, 1810); Conus mappa Crosse, 1858 (invalid: junior homonym of Conus mappa [Lightfoot], 1786); Gastridium eldredi (Morrison, 1955)

= Conus eldredi =

Species of sea snail

Conus eldredi is a species of sea snail, a marine gastropod mollusk in the family Conidae, the cone snails and their allies.

Like all species within the genus Conus, these snails are predatory and venomous. They are known to sting humans, therefore live ones should be handled carefully or not at all.

== Description ==
The size of the shell varies between 45 mm and 65 mm.

== Distribution ==
The species is found in various spots of the southern Pacific Ocean, such as near Indonesia and French Polynesia.
