= Conotoxin =

Group of neurotoxins

Alpha conotoxin precursor
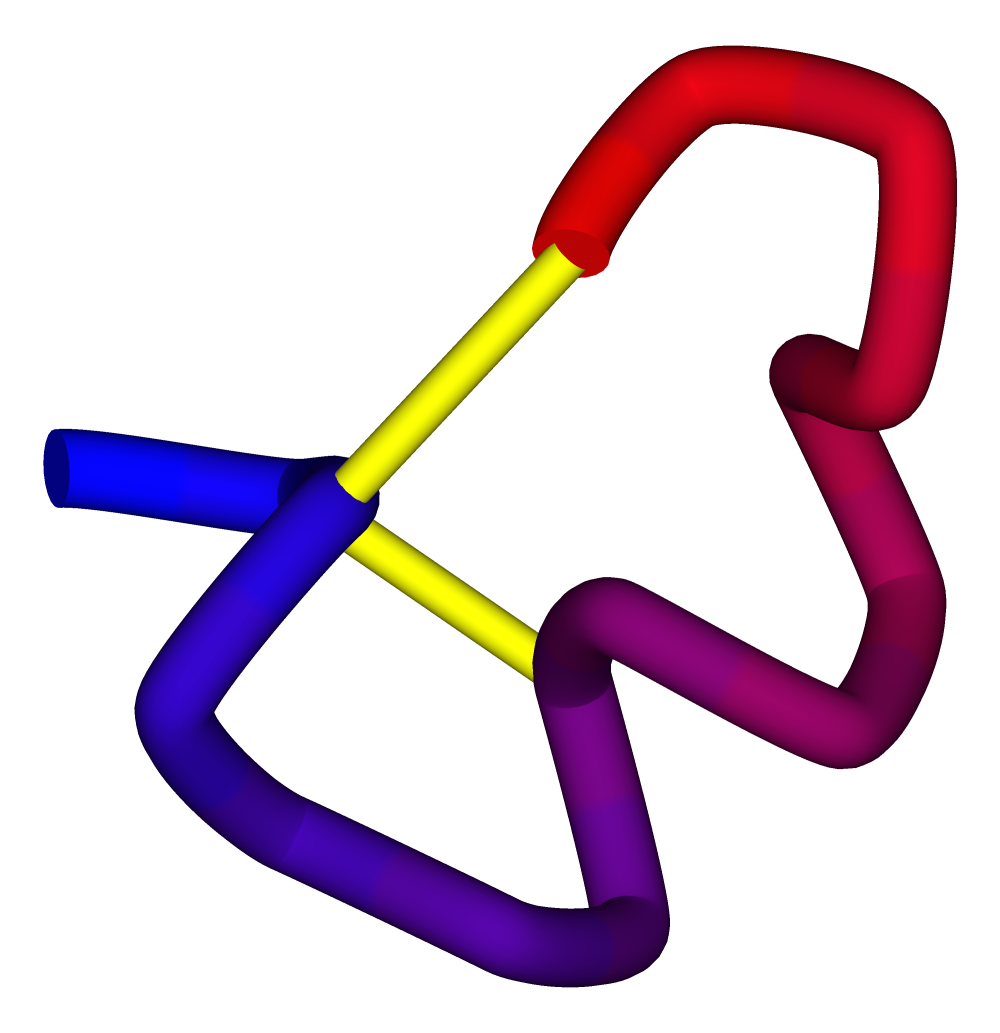
- α-Conotoxin PnIB from C. pennaceus, disulfide bonds shown in yellow. From the University of Michigan's Orientations of Proteins in Membranes database, PDB: 1AKG.

Identifiers
- Symbol: Toxin_8
- Pfam: PF07365
- InterPro: IPR009958
- PROSITE: PDOC60004
- SCOP2: 1mii / SCOPe / SUPFAM
- OPM superfamily: 148
- OPM protein: 1akg
Available protein structures:
- PDB: IPR009958 PF07365 (ECOD; PDBsum)
- AlphaFold: IPR009958; PF07365

Omega conotoxin
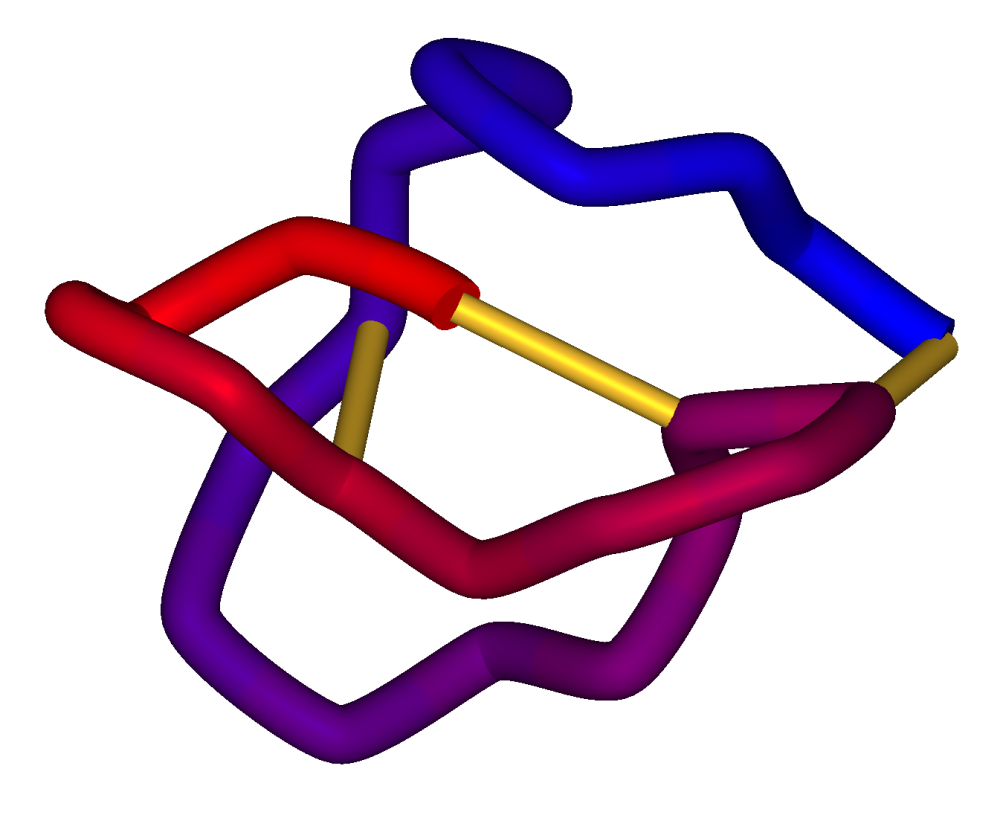
- Schematic diagram of the three-dimensional structure of ω-conotoxin MVIIA (ziconotide). Disulfide bonds are shown in gold. From PDB: 1DW5.

Identifiers
- Symbol: Conotoxin
- Pfam: PF02950
- InterPro: IPR004214
- SCOP2: 2cco / SCOPe / SUPFAM
- OPM superfamily: 112
- OPM protein: 1fyg
Available protein structures:
- PDB: IPR004214 PF02950 (ECOD; PDBsum)
- AlphaFold: IPR004214; PF02950

A conotoxin is one of a group of neurotoxic peptides isolated from the venom of the marine cone snail, genus Conus.

Conotoxins, which are peptides consisting of 10 to 30 amino acid residues, typically have one or more disulfide bonds. Conotoxins have a variety of mechanisms of actions, most of which have not been determined. However, it appears that many of these peptides modulate the activity of ion channels. Over the last few decades conotoxins have been the subject of pharmacological interest.

The LD_{50} of conotoxin ranges from 5-25 μg/kg.

== Hypervariability ==
Conotoxins are hypervariable even within the same species. They do not act within a body where they are produced (endogenously) but act on other organisms. Therefore, conotoxin genes experience less selection against mutations (like gene duplication and nonsynonymous substitution), and mutations remain in the genome longer, allowing more time for potentially beneficial novel functions to arise. Variability in conotoxin components reduces the likelihood that prey organisms will develop resistance; thus cone snails are under constant selective pressure to maintain polymorphism in these genes because failing to evolve and adapt will lead to extinction (Red Queen hypothesis).

== Disulfide connectivity ==
Types of conotoxins also differ in the number and pattern of disulfide bonds. The disulfide bonding network, as well as specific amino acids in inter-cysteine loops, provide the specificity of conotoxins.

== Types and biological activities ==
As of 2005, five biologically active conotoxins have been identified. Each of the five conotoxins attacks a different target:

- α-conotoxin inhibits nicotinic acetylcholine receptors at nerves and muscles.
- δ-conotoxin inhibits fast inactivation of voltage-dependent sodium channels.
- κ-conotoxin inhibits potassium channels.
- μ-conotoxin inhibits voltage-dependent sodium channels in muscles.
- ω-conotoxin inhibits N-type voltage-dependent calcium channels. Because N-type voltage-dependent calcium channels are related to algesia (sensitivity to pain) in the nervous system, ω-conotoxin has an analgesic effect: the effect of ω-conotoxin M VII A is 100 to 1000 times that of morphine. Therefore, a synthetic version of ω-conotoxin M VII A has found application as an analgesic drug ziconotide (Prialt).

=== Characterization ===
Considering conotoxins have become an area of interest for pharmaceutical leads, there has been an increased drive to characterize newly founded conotoxins. There are 3 ways: gene superfamily, cysteine framework, and pharmaceutical family. Much of the research on them before was focused on isolating the venom directly, which works for classifying the conotoxins for pharmacological family and cysteine framework. Pharmacological family classification is based on the receptor target and interaction of the conotoxin while the cysteine residues are the primary structure, which 26 main frameworks have been found as of present.

=== Alpha- Super Family ===
Alpha conotoxins have two types of cysteine arrangements, and are competitive nicotinic acetylcholine receptor antagonists. Alpha-GI is a peptide of 13 amino acids with two disulfide bonds which is a nicotinic-acetylcholine receptor antagonist that inhibits neuromuscular transmission.. This is a part of a diverse group of conotoxins which share a single peptide sequence and have a type 1 cysteine framework which tend to target an array of neuromuscular subtypes..

==== α-conotoxin PnIB ====
A conotoxin which consists of 16 residual peptides isolated from the molluscivorous snail Conus pennaceus. a-conotoxin PnIA inhibits neuronal nicotinic acetylcholine receptor (nAChR) with two disulfide bonds.It is present in the mixture of neuro toxins produced in the venom duct and injected into prey via the radular tooth connected to the venom bulb.

=== B-Conotoxin Superfamily ===
Conantokin-G, also known as the sleeper peptide, was isolated from the venom of Conus geographus. It has the ability to induce a sleep like phenomenon and was the first conotoxin to not have any cysteine residues, which is unusual because this is one of the key characteristics of conotoxin classification.

=== Delta, kappa, and omega ===
Omega, delta and kappa families of conotoxins have a knottin or inhibitor cystine knot scaffold. The knottin scaffold is a very special disulfide-through-disulfide knot, in which the III-VI disulfide bond crosses the macrocycle formed by two other disulfide bonds (I-IV and II-V) and the interconnecting backbone segments, where I-VI indicates the six cysteine residues starting from the N-terminus. The cysteine arrangements are the same for omega, delta and kappa families, even though omega conotoxins are calcium channel blockers, whereas delta conotoxins delay the inactivation of sodium channels, and kappa conotoxins are potassium channel blockers.

Mu-conotoxin
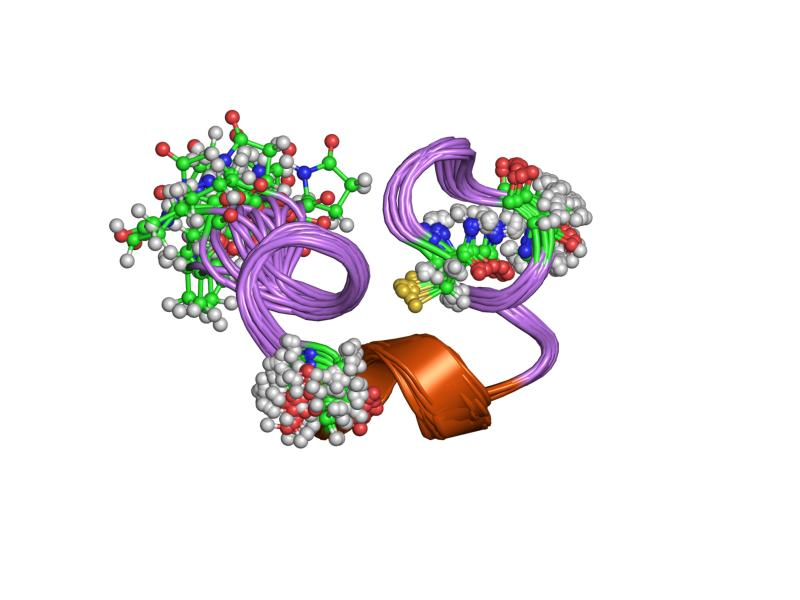
- nmr solution structure of piiia toxin, nmr, 20 structures

Identifiers
- Symbol: Mu-conotoxin
- Pfam: PF05374
- Pfam clan: CL0083
- InterPro: IPR008036
- SCOP2: 1gib / SCOPe / SUPFAM
- OPM superfamily: 112
- OPM protein: 1ag7
Available protein structures:
- PDB: IPR008036 PF05374 (ECOD; PDBsum)
- AlphaFold: IPR008036; PF05374

=== Mu ===
Mu-conotoxins have two types of cysteine arrangements, but the knottin scaffold is not observed. Mu-conotoxins target the muscle-specific voltage-gated sodium channels, and are useful probes for investigating voltage-dependent sodium channels of excitable tissues. Mu-conotoxins target the voltage-gated sodium channels, preferentially those of skeletal muscle, and are useful probes for investigating voltage-dependent sodium channels of excitable tissues.

Different subtypes of voltage-gated sodium channels are found in different tissues in mammals, e.g., in muscle and brain, and studies have been carried out to determine the sensitivity and specificity of the mu-conotoxins for the different isoforms.

=== ConoServer ===
A database that has the structures and sequences of peptides expressed in conopeptides, also known as conotoxins. Considering conotoxins target human ion channels the three classifications that ConoServer uses are the gene super families, cystine frameworks, and the pharmacological families. The database also has information about post-translational modifications considering conotoxins are extremely post-translationally modified, the server has both naturally and artificially introduced modifications. To help understand conotoxins further, the database provides statistics about relationships between conopeptide classifications, the sequence between signal peptides and the super family, the number of entries for each of the snail species studied.

==== Genus Conus ====
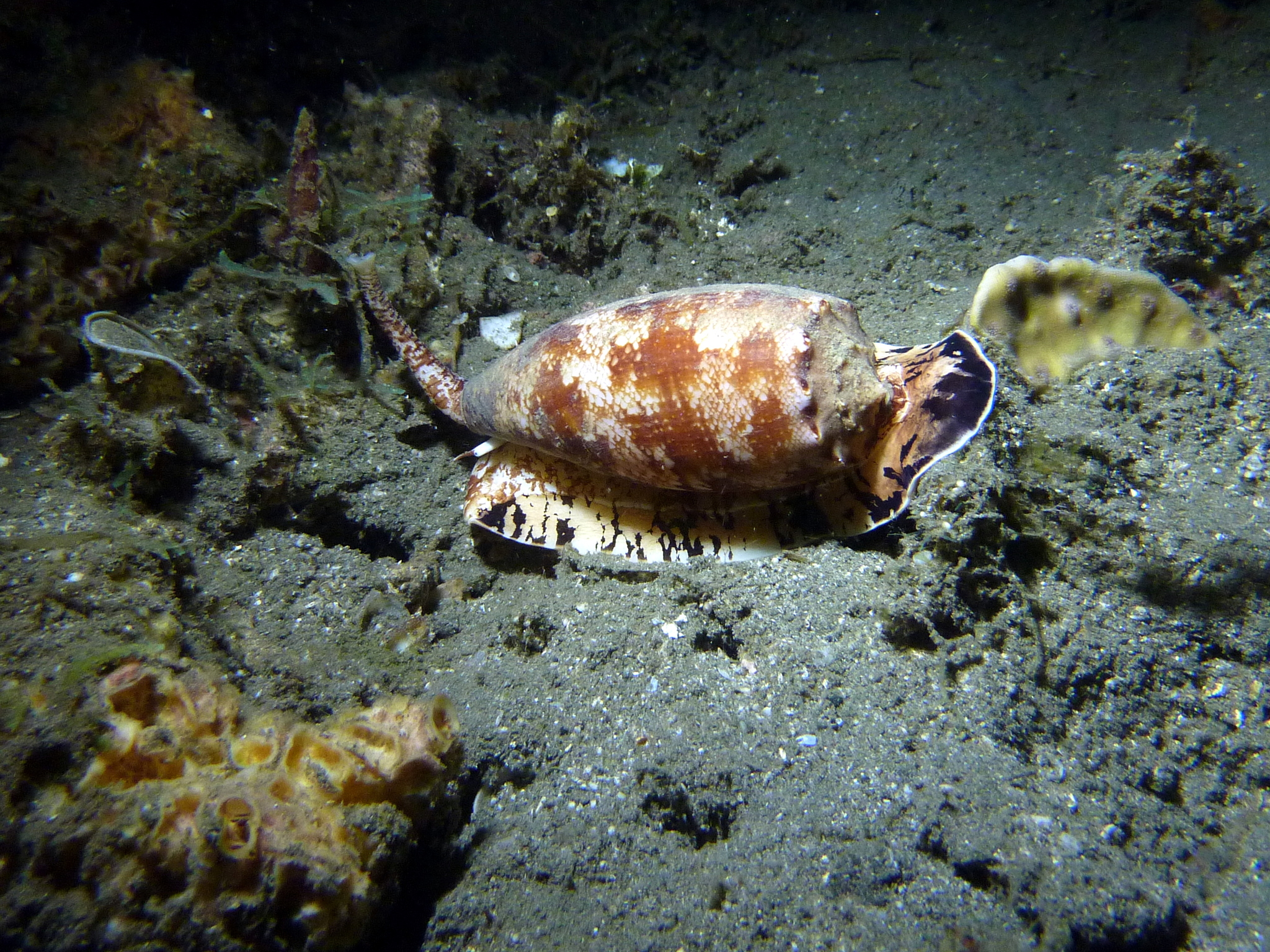
Conus geographus, a cone snail capable of producing conotoxins to stun their prey.

This snail is found in reef in the Indo-pacific, along the shores of Australia. It hunts small fish by injecting prey with its proboscis. The snail hunts by injecting conotoxin through the proboscis and hollow radular tooth. The venom is created in the snails venom glands where it also makes digestive enzymes.

=== Conotoxin Effects ===
Divers handle cone snails without knowing their mechanisms of envenomation. The some causes of envenomation of a cone snail are paralysis, respiratory failure, and muscle pains. At the envenomation site there could be numbness, ischemia, cyanosis, and necrosis in either localized or entire regions of the body Due to the complexity and multitude of conotoxins that block different pathways, little progress has been made to make an anti-venom.

=== Treatment ===
Intervention for a cone snail envenomation involves seeking care at a hospital to ensure the patient's airway and circulation is working properly. Methods like pressure immobilization could prevent venom from spreading into other areas of the body to prevent further injury.

=== Other applications ===
Considering conotoxins affect so many ion channels, they are currently being explored to provide pain relief for intractable pain.

== See also ==
- Conolidine
- Contryphan, members of "conotoxin O2"
- Conantokins, also known as "conotoxin B"
