= GRIN1 =

Protein-coding gene in humans

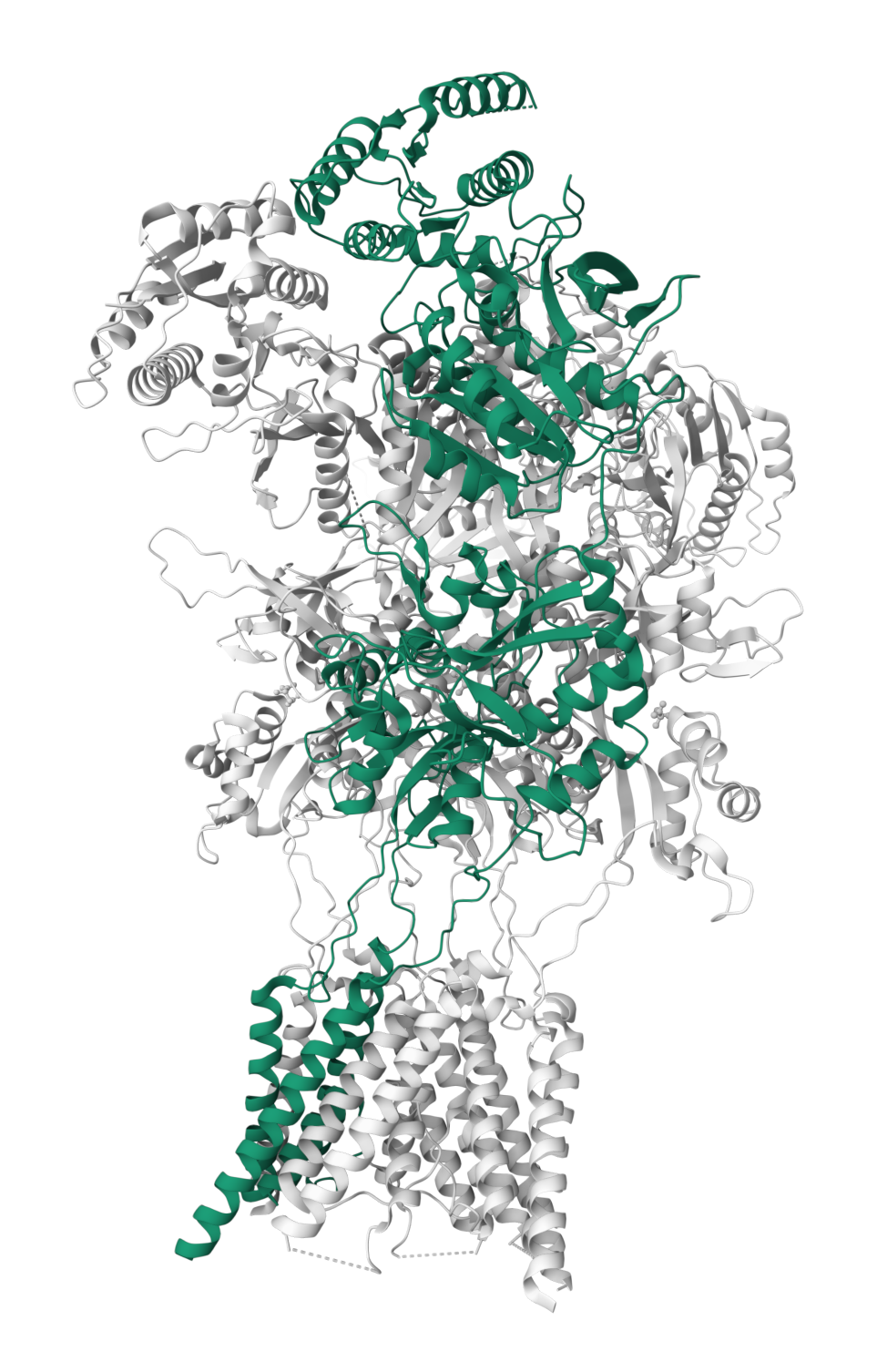

Identifiers
- Aliases: GRIN1, GluN1, MRD8, NMDA1, NMDAR1, NR1, NMD-R1, glutamate ionotropic receptor NMDA type subunit 1, NDHMSR, NDHMSD, DEE101
- External IDs: OMIM: 138249; MGI: 95819; GeneCards: GRIN1
Available structures
PDB	Ortholog search: PDBe RCSB
PDB	List of PDB id codes 2HQW, 2NR1, 3BYA, 5H8N, 5H8H, 5H8Q, 5H8F, 5I2N, 5I2K, 5KCJ, 5KDT

Gene location (Human)
Chr.	Chromosome 9 (human)
Band	9q34.3	Start	137,139,154 bp
Band	9q34.3	End	137,168,756 bp

Gene location (Mouse)
Chr.	Chromosome 2 (mouse)
Band	2 A3|2 17.14 cM	Start	25,181,193 bp
Band	2 A3|2 17.14 cM	End	25,209,199 bp
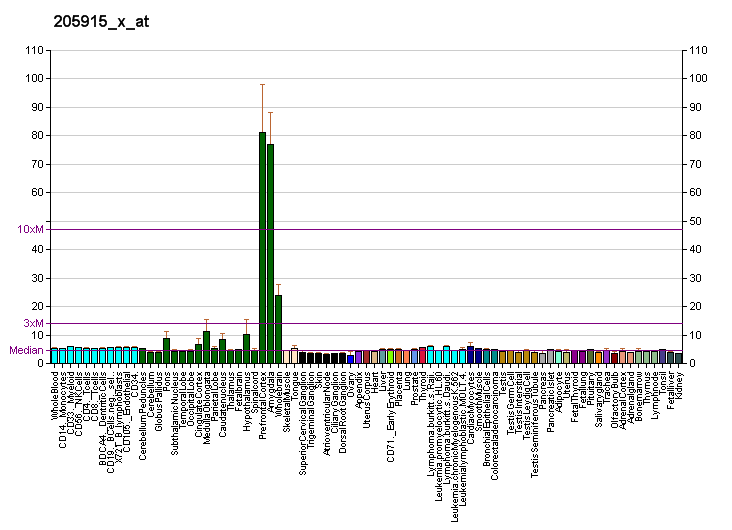

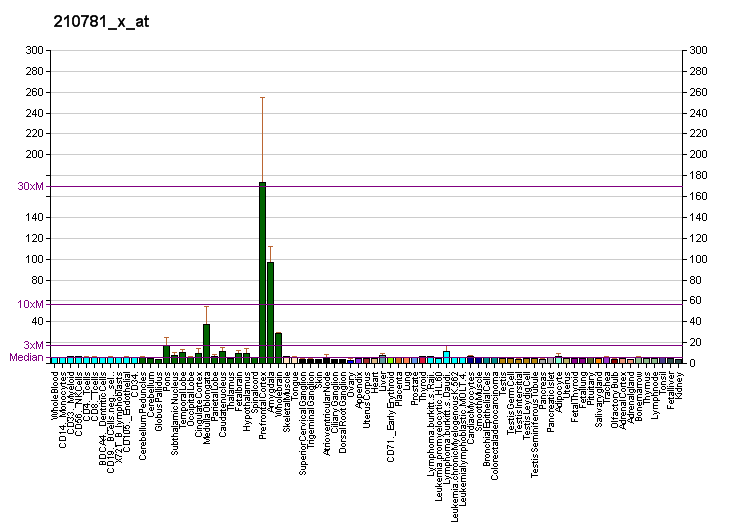

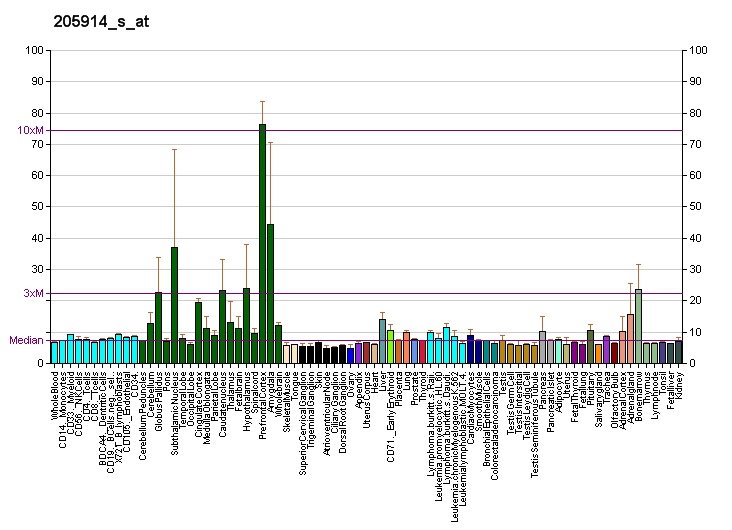
RNA expression pattern
Bgee	Human / Mouse (ortholog); Top expressed in: right hemisphere of cerebellum; right frontal lobe; anterior cingulate cortex; nucleus accumbens; prefrontal cortex; Brodmann area 9; putamen; amygdala; caudate nucleus; Brodmann area 10 / Top expressed in: perirhinal cortex; entorhinal cortex; primary visual cortex; superior frontal gyrus; CA3 field; dentate gyrus of hippocampal formation granule cell; cerebellar cortex; superior colliculus; molecular layer of cerebellar cortex; primary motor cortex; More reference expression data
BioGPS	More reference expression data
Gene ontology
Molecular function	calcium ion binding; signaling receptor binding; glycine binding; calmodulin binding; protein binding; cation channel activity; extracellularly glutamate-gated ion channel activity; glutamate binding; calcium channel activity; NMDA glutamate receptor activity; ion channel activity; ionotropic glutamate receptor activity; neurotransmitter binding; transmitter-gated ion channel activity involved in regulation of postsynaptic membrane potential; amyloid-beta binding; glutamate-gated calcium ion channel activity; signaling receptor activity; protein-containing complex binding
Cellular component	cytoplasm; postsynaptic membrane; membrane; synapse; NMDA selective glutamate receptor complex; neuron projection; synaptic vesicle; dendritic spine; cell surface; endoplasmic reticulum; integral component of membrane; plasma membrane; postsynaptic density; integral component of plasma membrane; excitatory synapse; cell junction; dendrite; synaptic cleft; terminal bouton; postsynaptic density membrane; synaptic membrane; glutamatergic synapse; integral component of postsynaptic density membrane
Biological process	negative regulation of neuron apoptotic process; pons maturation; synaptic transmission, glutamatergic; regulation of respiratory gaseous exchange; response to amphetamine; regulation of membrane potential; regulation of synapse assembly; learning; positive regulation of excitatory postsynaptic potential; response to ethanol; calcium ion transport; suckling behavior; prepulse inhibition; male mating behavior; regulation of long-term neuronal synaptic plasticity; adult locomotory behavior; regulation of neuron apoptotic process; ion transport; memory; regulation of axonogenesis; neuromuscular process; ionotropic glutamate receptor signaling pathway; excitatory postsynaptic potential; learning or memory; social behavior; regulation of neuronal synaptic plasticity; associative learning; startle response; calcium ion homeostasis; cation transport; cellular calcium ion homeostasis; cation transmembrane transport; respiratory gaseous exchange by respiratory system; regulation of synaptic plasticity; response to morphine; propylene metabolic process; conditioned taste aversion; cerebral cortex development; transport; sensory perception of pain; olfactory learning; regulation of cell communication; visual learning; ephrin receptor signaling pathway; MAPK cascade; regulation of dendrite morphogenesis; ion transmembrane transport; long-term memory; positive regulation of apoptotic process; positive regulation of transcription by RNA polymerase II; positive regulation of GTPase activity; calcium ion transmembrane transport; regulation of ion transmembrane transport; brain development; positive regulation of calcium ion transport into cytosol; calcium-mediated signaling; protein heterotetramerization; calcium ion transmembrane import into cytosol; excitatory chemical synaptic transmission; positive regulation of reactive oxygen species biosynthetic process; protein localization to postsynaptic membrane; cellular response to amyloid-beta; response to glycine; positive regulation of cysteine-type endopeptidase activity; regulation of NMDA receptor activity
Sources:Amigo / QuickGO
Orthologs
Databases	NCBI: entry; OMA: entry
Species	Human	Mouse
Entrez	2902	14810
Ensembl	ENSG00000176884	ENSMUSG00000026959
UniProt	Q05586	P35438
RefSeq (mRNA)	NM_000832; NM_001185090; NM_001185091; NM_007327; NM_021569	NM_001177656; NM_001177657; NM_008169; NM_001372558; NM_001372559 NM_001372560; NM_001372561; NM_001372562
RefSeq (protein)	NP_000823; NP_001172019; NP_001172020; NP_015566; NP_067544	NP_001171127; NP_001171128; NP_032195; NP_001359487; NP_001359488 NP_001359489; NP_001359490; NP_001359491
Location (UCSC)	Chr 9: 137.14 – 137.17 Mb	Chr 2: 25.18 – 25.21 Mb
PubMed search
- Wikidata
View/Edit Human	View/Edit Mouse

Glutamate Receptor Ionotropic, [NMDA] subunit zeta-1 is a protein that in humans is encoded by the GRIN1 gene.

== Gene ==
The gene consists of 21 exons and undergoes alternative splicing, producing transcript variants that encode different GluN1 isoforms. Alternative splicing affects both the N-terminal region, through inclusion or exclusion of exon 5, and the C-terminal region. The sequence of exon 5 is identical in vertebrates, and its alternative splicing has been demonstrated in humans, mice and rats.

== Structure ==
The encoded protein, GluN1, is a subunit of N-methyl-D-aspartate receptors, members of the glutamate receptor channel superfamily. These receptors are heteromeric protein complexes whose subunits assemble to form a ligand-gated ion channel.

GluN1 exists as eight splice isoforms:

1. GluN1-1a
2. GluN1-1b
3. GluN1-2a
4. GluN1-2b
5. GluN1-3a
6. GluN1-3b
7. GluN1-4a
8. GluN1-4b

GluN1-1a, GluN1-1b, GluN1-2a and GluN1-2b contain the C2 cassette, whereas GluN1-3a, GluN1-3b, GluN1-4a and GluN1-4b contain the alternative C2' cassette.

== Function ==
GluN1 is obligatory for NMDA receptor function and contains the binding site for the co-agonist glycine. NMDA receptors play a key role in synaptic plasticity, which is believed to underlie learning and memory.

Cell-specific factors are thought to regulate the expression of GluN1 isoforms, potentially contributing to the functional diversity of NMDA receptors. GluN1-1a is the most abundantly expressed isoform across the central nervous system (CNS). Activity-dependent alternative splicing of the C-terminal region regulates GluN1 export from the endoplasmic reticulum and delivery of NMDA receptors to synapses. The functional significance of C-terminal splice variants varies across the CNS.

== See also ==
- NMDA receptor
