= Glutamate receptor =

Neuron membrane protein

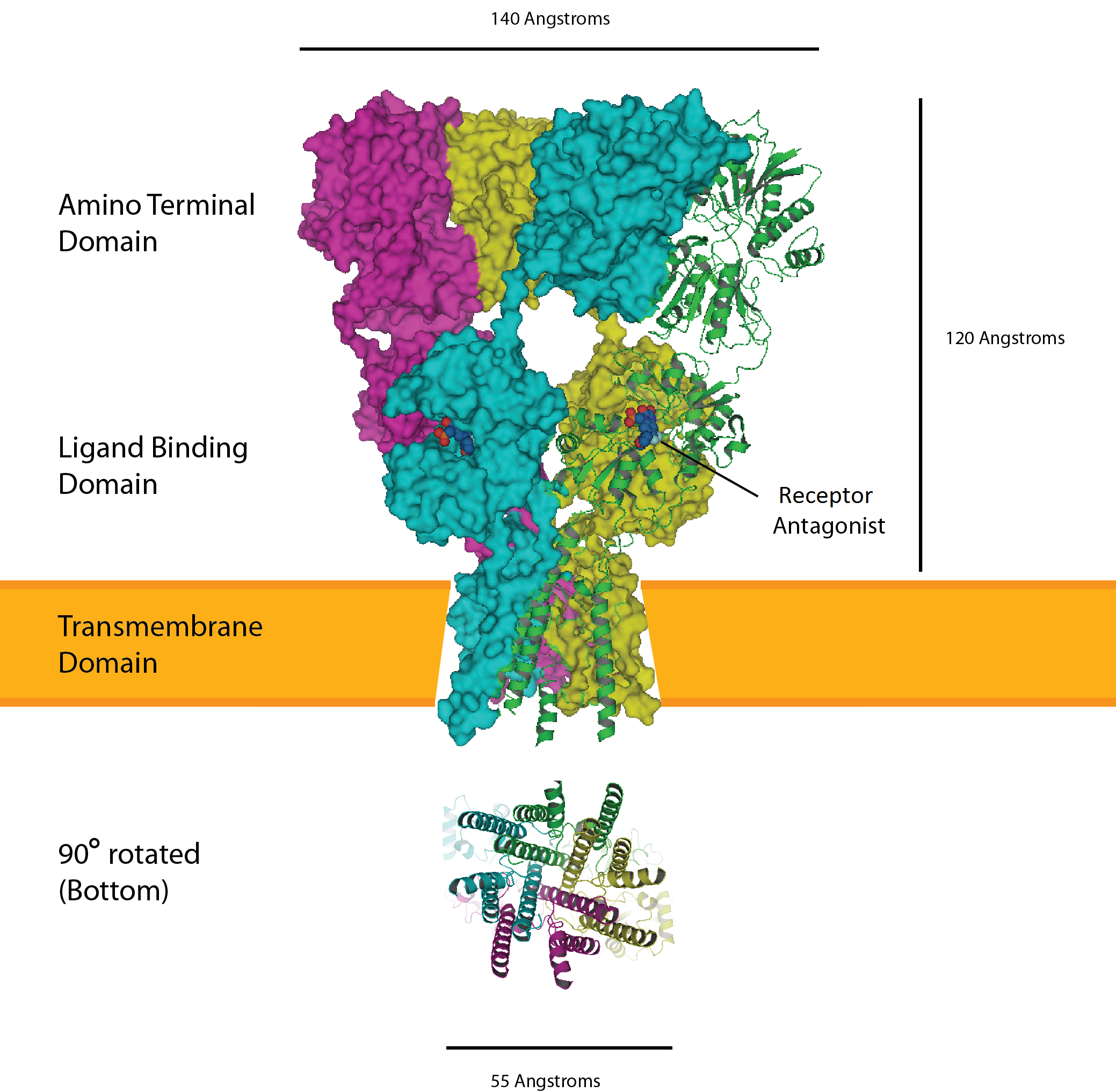
The AMPA receptor bound to a glutamate antagonist showing the amino terminal, ligand binding, and transmembrane domain, PDB 3KG2

Glutamic acid

Glutamate receptors are synaptic and non synaptic receptors located primarily on the membranes of neuronal and glial cells. Glutamate (the conjugate base of glutamic acid) is abundant in the human body, but particularly in the nervous system and especially prominent in the human brain where it is the body's most prominent neurotransmitter, the brain's main excitatory neurotransmitter, and also the precursor for GABA, the brain's main inhibitory neurotransmitter. Glutamate receptors are responsible for the glutamate-mediated postsynaptic excitation of neural cells, and are important for neural communication, memory formation, learning, and regulation.

Glutamate receptors are implicated in a number of neurological conditions. Their central role in excitotoxicity and prevalence in the central nervous system has been linked or speculated to be linked to many neurodegenerative diseases, and several other conditions have been further linked to glutamate receptor gene mutations or receptor autoantigen/antibody activity.

== Function ==
=== Glutamate ===
Glutamate is the most prominent neurotransmitter in the body, and is the main excitatory neurotransmitter, being present in over 50% of nervous tissue. Glutamate was initially discovered to be a neurotransmitter in insect studies in the early 1960s.

Glutamate is also used by the brain to synthesize GABA (γ-Aminobutyric acid), the main inhibitory neurotransmitter of the mammalian central nervous system. GABA plays a role in regulating neuronal excitability throughout the nervous system and is also directly responsible for the regulation of muscle tone in humans.

=== Glutamate receptors ===
Mammalian glutamate receptors are classified based on their pharmacology. However, glutamate receptors in other organisms have different pharmacology, and therefore these classifications do not hold. One of the major functions of glutamate receptors appears to be the modulation of synaptic plasticity, a property of the brain thought to be vital for memory and learning. Both metabotropic and ionotropic glutamate receptors have been shown to have an effect on synaptic plasticity. An increase or decrease in the number of ionotropic glutamate receptors on a postsynaptic cell may lead to long-term potentiation or long-term depression of that cell, respectively. Additionally, metabotropic glutamate receptors may modulate synaptic plasticity by regulating postsynaptic protein synthesis through second messenger systems. Research shows that glutamate receptors are present in CNS glial cells as well as neurons. These glutamate receptors are suggested to play a role in modulating gene expression in glial cells, both during the proliferation and differentiation of glial precursor cells in brain development and in mature glial cells.

Glutamate receptors serve to facilitate the impact of the neurotransmitter glutamate in the central nervous system. These receptors are pivotal in excitatory synaptic transmission, synaptic plasticity, and neuronal development. They are vital for functions like learning, memory, and neuronal communication. Various subtypes of glutamate receptors, such as NMDA (N-methyl-D-aspartate), AMPA (α-amino-3-hydroxy-5-methyl-4-isoxazolepropionic acid), and kainate receptors, have distinct roles in synaptic transmission and plasticity.

1. NMDA (N-methyl-D-aspartate) receptors: These receptors are involved in synaptic plasticity, learning, and memory. They are unique in that they require both glutamate and the co-agonist glycine to activate, and they are also voltage-dependent, meaning they only open when the postsynaptic membrane is depolarized. NMDA receptors are permeable to calcium ions, which can trigger intracellular signaling pathways that lead to changes in synaptic strength.

2. AMPA (α-amino-3-hydroxy-5-methyl-4-isoxazolepropionic acid) receptors: These receptors mediate the majority of fast excitatory synaptic transmission in the brain. They are permeable to sodium and potassium ions and are responsible for the rapid depolarization of the postsynaptic membrane that underlies the excitatory postsynaptic potential (EPSP). AMPA receptors are also involved in synaptic plasticity, particularly in the early stages of long-term potentiation (LTP).

3. Kainate receptors: These receptors are involved in both pre- and postsynaptic signaling and are thought to play a role in regulating synaptic transmission and plasticity. They are activated by the drug kainate and are permeable to both sodium and potassium ions. Kainate receptors are expressed in a variety of brain regions and are involved in processes such as sensory processing, motor control, and learning and memory.

Each subtype of glutamate receptor has a unique function and plays a crucial role in neuronal communication and plasticity.

== Types ==
Ionotropic glutamate receptors (iGluRs) form the ion channel pore that activates when glutamate binds to the receptor. Metabotropic glutamate receptors (mGluRs) affect the cell through a signal transduction cascade, and they may be primarily activating (mGlur_{1/5}) or primarily inhibitory (mGlur_{2/3} and mGlur_{4/6/7/8}). Ionotropic receptors tend to be quicker in relaying information, but metabotropic ones are associated with a more prolonged stimulus. The signalling cascade induced by metabotropic receptor activation means that even a relatively brief or small synaptic signal can have large and long-lasting effects, i.e. the system can have high "gain." NMDA receptor activation is particularly complex, as channel opening requires not only glutamate binding but also glycine or serine binding simultaneously at a separate site, and it also displays a degree of voltage dependence due to Zn^{2+} or Mg^{2+} binding in the pore. Furthermore, Ca^{2+} currents through the NMDA receptor modulate not just the membrane potential but act as an important second messenger system. The particular dynamics of the NMDAR allow it to function as a neural coincidence detector, and the NMDAR Ca^{2+} currents are critical in synaptic plasticity (LTP and LTD) and learning and memory in general.

Of the many specific subtypes of glutamate receptors, it is customary to refer to primary subtypes by a chemical that binds to it more selectively than glutamate. The research, however, is ongoing, as subtypes are identified and chemical affinities measured. Several compounds are routinely used in glutamate receptor research and associated with receptor subtypes:

Type	Name	Agonist(s)	Antagonists
ionotropic	NMDA receptor	NMDA	Ketamine
ionotropic	Kainate receptor	Kainate	UBP-302
ionotropic	AMPA receptor	AMPA	Perampanel
Group 1 metabotropic	mGluR_{1}, mGluR_{5}	DHPG	LY-344,545
Group 2 metabotropic	mGluR_{2}, mGluR_{3}	DCG-IV	LY-341,495
Group 3 metabotropic	mGluR_{4}, mGluR_{6}, mGluR_{7}, mGluR_{8}	L-AP4	MMPIP (mGlur_{7})

Due to the diversity of glutamate receptors, their subunits are encoded by numerous gene families. Sequence similarities between mammals show a common evolutionary origin for many mGluR and all iGluR genes. Conservation of reading frames and splice sites of GluR genes between chimpanzees and humans is complete, suggesting no gross structural changes after humans diverged from the human-chimpanzee common ancestor. However, there is a possibility that two human-specific "fixed" amino acid substitutions, D71G in GRIN3A and R727H in GRIN3B, are specifically associated with human brain function.

=== Ionotropic ===
Mammalian ionotropic glutamate receptor subunits and their genes:

Mammalian receptor family	Subunit (Old nomenclature)	Gene	Chromosome (human)
AMPA	GluA1 (GluR_{1})	GRIA1	5q33
AMPA	GluA2 (GluR_{2})	GRIA2	4q32-33
AMPA	GluA3 (GluR_{3})	GRIA3	Xq25-26
AMPA	GluA4 (GluR_{4})	GRIA4	11q22-23
Kainate	GluK1 (GluR_{5})	GRIK1	21q21.1-22.1
Kainate	GluK2 (GluR_{6})	GRIK2	6q16.3-q21
Kainate	GluK3 (GluR_{7})	GRIK3	1p34-p33
Kainate	GluK4 (KA-1)	GRIK4	11q22.3
Kainate	GluK5 (KA-2)	GRIK5	19q13.2
NMDA	GluN1(NR1)	GRIN1	9q34.3
NMDA	GluN2A (NR2A)	GRIN2A	16p13.2
NMDA	GluN2B (NR2B)	GRIN2B	12p12
NMDA	GluN2C (NR2C)	GRIN2C	17q24-q25
NMDA	GluN2D (NR2D)	GRIN2D	19q13.1qter
NMDA	GluN3A (NR3A)	GRIN3A	9q31.1
NMDA	GluN3B (NR3B)	GRIN3B	19p13.3

=== Metabotropic ===
Mammalian metabotropic glutamate receptors are all named mGluR# and are further broken down into three groups:

Group	Receptor	Gene	Chromosome (human)	Effect
1	mGluR_{1}	GRM1	6q24	Increase in Ca^{2+} concentration in the cytoplasm.
1	mGluR_{5}	GRM5	11q14.3	Release of K^{+} from the cell by activating K^{+} ionic channels
2	mGluR_{2}	GRM2	3p21.2	Inhibition of adenylyl cyclase causing shutdown of the cAMP-dependent pathway And therefore decreasing amount of cAMP
2	mGluR_{3}	GRM3	7q21.1-q21.2	Inhibition of adenylyl cyclase causing shutdown of the cAMP-dependent pathway And therefore decreasing amount of cAMP
3	mGluR_{4}	GRM4	6p21.3	Activation of Ca^{2+} channels, allowing more Ca^{2+} to enter the cell
3	mGluR_{6}	GRM6	5q35	Activation of Ca^{2+} channels, allowing more Ca^{2+} to enter the cell
3	mGluR_{7}	GRM7	3p26-p25	Activation of Ca^{2+} channels, allowing more Ca^{2+} to enter the cell
3	mGluR_{8}	GRM8	7q31.3-q32.1	Activation of Ca^{2+} channels, allowing more Ca^{2+} to enter the cell

In other (non mammalian) organisms, the classification and subunit composition of glutamate receptors is different.

== Structure, mechanism and function ==
Glutamate receptors exist primarily in the central nervous system. These receptors can be found on the dendrites of postsynaptic cells and bind to glutamate released into the synaptic cleft by presynaptic cells. They are also present on both astrocytes and oligodendrocytes. Ionotropic and metabotropic glutamate receptors, with the exception of NMDA, are found on cultured glial cells, which can open in response to glutamate and cause cells to activate second messengers to regulate gene expression and release neuroactive compounds. Furthermore, brain slices show glutamate receptors are ubiquitously expressed in both developing and mature astrocytes and oligodendrocytes in vivo. Because of this, glial glutamate receptors are thought to be vital for glial cell development.

=== Ionotropic ===
Ionotropic glutamate receptors, by definition, are ligand-gated nonselective cation channels that allow the flow of K^{+}, Na^{+} and sometimes Ca^{2+} in response to glutamate binding. (In C. elegans and Drosophila, invertebrate-specific subunits enable the flow of negative chloride ions rather than cations.) Upon binding, the agonist will stimulate direct action of the central pore of the receptor, an ion channel, allowing ion flow and causing excitatory postsynaptic current (EPSC). This current is depolarizing and, if enough glutamate receptors are activated, may trigger an action potential in the postsynaptic neuron. All produce excitatory postsynaptic current, but the speed and duration of the current is different for each type. NMDA receptors have an internal binding site for an Mg^{2+} ion, creating a voltage-dependent block, which is removed by outward flow of positive current. Since the block must be removed by outward current flow, NMDA receptors rely on the EPSC produced by AMPA receptors to open. NMDA receptors are permeable to Ca^{2+}, which is an important cation in the nervous system and has been linked to gene regulation. The flow of Ca^{2+} through NMDA receptors is thought to cause both long-term potentiation (LTP, of synapse efficacy) and long-term depression (LTD) by transducing signaling cascades and regulating gene expression.

=== Metabotropic ===
Metabotropic glutamate receptors, which belong to subfamily C of G protein-coupled receptors are divided into three groups, with a total of eight subtypes (in mammals; this is not necessarily the case for most organisms). The mGluRs are composed of three distinct regions: the extracellular region, the transmembrane region, and the intracellular region. The extracellular region is composed of a venus flytrap (VFT) module that binds glutamate, and a cysteine-rich domain that is thought to play a role in transmitting the conformational change induced by ligand binding from in the VFT module to the transmembrane region. The transmembrane region consists of seven transmembrane domains and connects the extracellular region to the intracellular region where G protein coupling occurs. Glutamate binding to the extracellular region of an mGluR causes G proteins bound to the intracellular region to be phosphorylated, affecting multiple biochemical pathways and ion channels in the cell. Because of this, mGluRs can both increase or decrease the excitability of the postsynaptic cell, thereby causing a wide range of physiological effects.

=== Outside the central nervous system ===
Glutamate receptors are thought to be responsible for the reception and transduction of umami taste stimuli. Taste receptors of the T1R family, belonging to the same class of GPCR as metabotropic glutamate receptors are involved. Additionally, the mGluRs, as well as ionotropic glutamate receptors in neural cells, have been found in taste buds and may contribute to the umami taste. Numerous ionotropic glutamate receptor subunits are expressed by heart tissue, but their specific function is still unknown. Western blots and northern blots confirmed the presence of iGluRs in cardiac tissue. Immunohistochemistry localized the iGluRs to cardiac nerve terminals, ganglia, conducting fibers, and some myocardiocytes. Glutamate receptors are (as mentioned above) also expressed in pancreatic islet cells. AMPA iGluRs modulate the secretion of insulin and glucagon in the pancreas, opening the possibility of treatment of diabetes via glutamate receptor antagonists. Small unmyelinated sensory nerve terminals in the skin also express NMDA and non-NMDA receptors. Subcutaneous injections of receptor blockers in rats successfully analgesized skin from formalin-induced inflammation, raising possibilities of targeting peripheral glutamate receptors in the skin for pain treatment.

== General clinical implications ==
Specific medical conditions and symptoms are discussed below.

=== Autoimmunity and antibody interactions with glutamate receptors and their subunit genes ===
Various neurological disorders are accompanied by antibody or autoantigen activity associated with glutamate receptors or their subunit genes (e.g. GluR3 in Rasmussen's encephalitis, and GluR2 in nonfamilial olivopontocerebellar degeneration). In 1994 GluR3 was shown to act as an autoantigen in Rasmussen's encephalitis, leading to speculation that autoimmune activity might underlie the condition. Such findings "suggest" links between glutamate receptors and autoimmune interactions are possible and may be significant in some degenerative diseases, however the exact role of such antibodies in disease manifestation is still not entirely known.

=== Excitotoxicity ===
Overstimulation of glutamate receptors causes neurodegeneration and neuronal damage through a process called excitotoxicity. Excessive glutamate, or excitotoxins acting on the same glutamate receptors, overactivate glutamate receptors (specifically NMDARs), causing high levels of calcium ions (Ca^{2+}) to influx into the postsynaptic cell.

High Ca^{2+} concentrations activate a cascade of cell degradation processes involving proteases, lipases, nitric oxide synthase, and a number of enzymes that damage cell structures often to the point of cell death. Ingestion of or exposure to excitotoxins that act on glutamate receptors can induce excitotoxicity and cause toxic effects on the central nervous system. This becomes a problem for cells, as it feeds into a cycle of positive feedback cell death.

Glutamate excitotoxicity triggered by overstimulation of glutamate receptors also contributes to intracellular oxidative stress. Proximal glial cells use a cystine/glutamate antiporter (xCT) to transport cystine into the cell and glutamate out. Excessive extracellular glutamate concentrations reverse xCT, so glial cells no longer have enough cystine to synthesize glutathione (GSH), an antioxidant. Lack of GSH leads to more reactive oxygen species (ROSs) that damage and kill the glial cell, which then cannot reuptake and process extracellular glutamate. This is another positive feedback in glutamate excitotoxicity. In addition, increased Ca^{2+} concentrations activate nitric oxide synthase (NOS) and the over-synthesis of nitric oxide (NO). High NO concentration damages mitochondria, leading to more energy depletion, and adds oxidative stress to the neuron as NO is a ROS.

=== Neurodegeneration and ischemia ===
In the case of traumatic brain injury or cerebral ischemia (e.g., cerebral infarction or hemorrhage), acute neurodegeneration caused by excitotoxicity may spread to proximal neurons through various processes. Hypoxia and hypoglycemia trigger bioenergetic failure; mitochondria stop producing ATP energy. Na+/K+-ATPase can no longer maintain sodium/potassium ion concentration gradients across the plasma membrane. Under these conditions the extracellular glutamate concentrations may increase by various mechanisms. Glutamate transporters (EAATs), which use the Na^{+}/K^{+} gradient, provide less efficient glutamate uptake and even may reverse glutamate transport (efflux) in affected neurons and astrocytes. Depolarization increases downstream synaptic release of glutamate, but also other glutamate release mechanisms may play a role. In addition, cell death via lysis or apoptosis releases cytoplasmic glutamate. These mechanisms cause a continual cascade of excitotoxic cell death and further increased extracellular glutamate concentrations.

Glutamate receptors' significance in excitotoxicity also links it to many neurogenerative diseases. Conditions such as exposure to excitotoxins, old age, congenital predisposition, and brain trauma can trigger glutamate receptor activation and ensuing excitotoxic neurodegeneration. This damage to the central nervous system propagates symptoms associated with a number of diseases.

== Conditions with demonstrated associations to glutamate receptors ==
A number of diseases in humans have a proven association with genetic mutations of glutamate receptor genes, or autoantigen/antibody interactions with glutamate receptors or their genes. Glutamate receptors and impaired regulation (in particular, those resulting in excessive glutamate levels) are also one cause of excitotoxicity (described above), which itself has been implicated or associated with a number of specific neurodegenerative conditions where neural cell death or degradation within the brain occurs over time.

Excessive synaptic receptor stimulation by glutamate is directly related to many conditions. Magnesium is one of many antagonists at the glutamate receptor, and magnesium deficiencies have demonstrated relationships with many glutamate receptor-related conditions. At the same time, the aminosulfonic acid taurine plays an important role as an endogenous and exogenous modulator of this metabolic process.

Glutamate receptors have been found to have an influence in cancer, ischemia/stroke, seizures, Parkinson's disease, Huntington's disease, and aching, addiction and an association with both ADHD and autism.

In most cases these are areas of ongoing research.

=== Aching ===
Hyperalgesia is directly involved with spinal NMDA receptors. Administered NMDA antagonists in a clinical setting produce significant side effects, although more research is being done in intrathecal administration. Since spinal NMDA receptors link the area of pain to the brain's pain processing center, the thalamus, these glutamate receptors are a prime target for treatment. One proposed way to cope with the pain is subconsciously through the visualization technique.

=== Attention deficit hyperactivity disorder (ADHD) ===
In 2006 the glutamate receptor subunit gene GRIN2B (responsible for key functions in memory and learning) was associated with ADHD. This followed earlier studies showing a link between glutamate modulation and hyperactivity (2001), and then between the SLC1A3 solute carrier gene-encoding part of the glutamate transporter process that mapped to chromosome 5 (5p12) noted in multiple ADHD genome scans.

Further mutations to four different metabotropic glutamate receptor genes were identified in a study of 1013 children with ADHD compared to 4105 controls with non-ADHD, replicated in a subsequent study of 2500 more patients. Deletions and duplications affected GRM1, GRM5, GRM7 and GRM8. The study concluded that "CNVs affecting metabotropic glutamate receptor genes were enriched across all cohorts (P = 2.1 × 10−9)", "over 200 genes interacting with glutamate receptors […] were collectively affected by CNVs", "major hubs of the (affected genes') network include TNIK50, GNAQ51, and CALM", and "the fact that children with ADHD are more likely to have alterations in these genes reinforces previous evidence that the GRM pathway is important in ADHD".

A SciBX article in January 2012 commented that "UPenn and MIT teams have independently converged on mGluRs as players in ADHD and autism. The findings suggest agonizing mGluRs in patients with ADHD."

=== Autism ===
The etiology of autism may include excessive glutamatergic mechanisms. In small studies, memantine has been shown to significantly improve language function and social behavior in children with autism. Research is underway on the effects of memantine in adults with autism spectrum disorders.

A link between glutamate receptors and autism was also identified via the structural protein ProSAP1 SHANK2 and potentially ProSAP2 SHANK3. The study authors concluded that the study "illustrates the significant role glutamatergic systems play in autism" and "By comparing the data on ProSAP1/Shank2^{−/−} mutants with ProSAP2/Shank3αβ^{−/−} mice, we show that different abnormalities in synaptic glutamate receptor expression can cause alterations in social interactions and communication. Accordingly, we propose that appropriate therapies for autism spectrum disorders are to be carefully matched to the underlying synaptopathic phenotype."

=== Diabetes ===
Diabetes is a peculiar case because it is influenced by glutamate receptors present outside of the central nervous system, and it also influences glutamate receptors in the central nervous system.

Diabetes mellitus, an endocrine disorder, induces cognitive impairment and defects of long-term potential in the hippocampus, interfering with synaptic plasticity. Defects of long-term potential in the hippocampus are due to abnormal glutamate receptors, to be specific the malfunctioning NMDA glutamate receptors during early stages of the disease.

Research is being done to address the possibility of using hyperglycemia and insulin to regulate these receptors and restore cognitive functions. Pancreatic islets regulating insulin and glucagon levels also express glutamate receptors. Treating diabetes via glutamate receptor antagonists is possible, but not much research has been done. The difficulty of modifying peripheral GluR without having detrimental effects on the central nervous system, which is saturated with GluR, may be the cause of this.

=== Huntington's disease ===
In 2004, a specific genotype of human GluR6 was discovered to have a slight influence on the age of onset of Huntington's disease.

In addition to similar mechanisms causing Parkinson's disease with respect to NMDA or AMPA receptors, Huntington's disease was also proposed to exhibit metabolic and mitochondrial deficiency, which exposes striatal neurons to the over activation of NMDA receptors. Using folic acid has been proposed as a possible treatment for Huntington's due to the inhibition it exhibits on homocysteine, which increases vulnerability of nerve cells to glutamate. This could decrease the effect glutamate has on glutamate receptors and reduce cell response to a safer level, not reaching excitotoxicity.

=== Ischemia ===
During ischemia, the brain has been observed to have an unnaturally high concentration of extracellular glutamate. This is linked to an inadequate supply of ATP, which drives the glutamate transport levels that keep the concentrations of glutamate in balance. This usually leads to an excessive activation of glutamate receptors, which may lead to neuronal injury. After this overexposure, the postsynaptic terminals tend to keep glutamate around for long periods of time, which results in a difficulty in depolarization. Antagonists for NMDA and AMPA receptors seem to have a large benefit, with more aid the sooner it is administered after onset of the neural ischemia.

=== Multiple sclerosis ===
Inducing experimental autoimmune encephalomyelitis in animals as a model for multiple sclerosis(MS) has targeted some glutamate receptors as a pathway for potential therapeutic applications. This research has found that a group of drugs interact with the NMDA, AMPA, and kainate glutamate receptor to control neurovascular permeability, inflammatory mediator synthesis, and resident glial cell functions including CNS myelination. Oligodendrocytes in the CNS myelinate axons; the myelination dysfunction in MS is partly due to the excitotoxicity of those cells. By regulating the drugs which interact with those glutamate receptors, regulating glutamate binding may be possible, and thereby reduce the levels of Ca^{2+} influx. The experiments showed improved oligodendrocyte survival, and remyelination increased. Furthermore, CNS inflammation, apoptosis, and axonal damage were reduced.

=== Parkinson's disease (Parkinsonism) ===
Late-onset neurological disorders, such as Parkinson's disease, may be partially due to glutamate binding NMDA and AMPA glutamate receptors. In vitro spinal cord cultures with glutamate transport inhibitors led to degeneration of motor neurons, which was counteracted by some AMPA receptor antagonists such as GYKI 52466. Research also suggests that the metabotropic glutamate receptor mGlu4 is directly involved in movement disorders associated with the basal ganglia through selectively modulating glutamate in the striatum.

=== Rasmussen's encephalitis ===
In 1994, GluR3 was shown to act as an autoantigen in Rasmussen's encephalitis, leading to speculation that autoimmune activity might underlie the condition.

=== Schizophrenia ===
In schizophrenia, the expression of the mRNA for the NR2A subunit of the NMDA glutamate receptor was found to be decreased in a subset of inhibitory interneurons in the cerebral cortex. This is suggested by upregulation of GABA, an inhibitory neurotransmitter. In schizophrenia, the expression of the NR2A subunit of NMDA receptors in mRNA was experimentally undetectable in 49-73% in GABA neurons that usually express it. These are mainly in GABA cells expressing the calcium-buffering protein parvalbumin (PV), which exhibits fast-spiking firing properties and target the perisomatic (basket cells) and axo-axonic (chandelier cells) compartments of pyramidal neurons. The study found the density of NR2A mRNA-expressing PV neurons was decreased by as much as 50% in subjects with schizophrenia.

In addition, density of immunohistochemically labeled glutamatergic terminals with an antibody against the vesicular glutamate transporter vGluT1 also exhibited a reduction that paralleled the reduction in the NR2A-expressing PV neurons. Together, these observations suggest glutamatergic innervation of PV-containing inhibitory neurons appears to be deficient in schizophrenia. Expression of NR2A mRNA has also been found to be altered in the inhibitory neurons that contain another calcium buffer, calbindin, targeting the dendrites of pyramidal neurons, and the expression of the mRNA for the GluR5 kainate receptor in GABA neurons has also been found to be changed in people with schizophrenia.

Current research is targeting glutamate receptor antagonists as potential treatments for schizophrenia. Memantine, a weak, nonselective NMDA receptor antagonist, was used as an add-on to clozapine therapy in a clinical trial. Refractory schizophrenia patients showed associated improvements in both negative and positive symptoms, underscoring the potential uses of GluR antagonists as antipsychotics. Furthermore, administration of noncompetitive NMDA receptor antagonists have been tested on rat models. Scientists have proposed that specific antagonists can act on GABAergic interneurons, enhancing cortical inhibition and preventing excessive glutamatergic transmission associated with schizophrenia. These and other atypical antipsychotic drugs can be used together to inhibit excessive excitability in pyramidal cells, decreasing the symptoms of schizophrenia.

=== Seizures ===
Glutamate receptors have been discovered to have a role in the onset of epilepsy. NMDA and metabotropic types have been found to induce epileptic convulsions. Using rodent models, labs have found that the introduction of antagonists to these glutamate receptors helps counteract the epileptic symptoms. Since glutamate is a ligand for ligand-gated ion channels, the binding of this neurotransmitter will open gates and increase sodium and calcium conductance. These ions play an integral part in the causes of seizures. Group 1 metabotropic glutamate receptors (mGlu1 and mGlu5) are the primary cause of seizing, so applying an antagonist to these receptors helps in preventing convulsions.

== Other diseases suspected of glutamate receptor link ==
=== Neurodegenerative diseases with a suspected excitotoxicity link ===
Neurodegenerative diseases suspected to have a link mediated (at least in part) through stimulation of glutamate receptors:

- AIDS dementia complex
- Alzheimer's disease
- Amyotrophic lateral sclerosis
- Combined systems disease (vitamin B_{12} deficiency)
- Depression/anxiety
- Drug addiction, tolerance, and dependency
- Essential tremor
- Glaucoma
- Hepatic encephalopathy
- Hydroxybutyric aminoaciduria
- Hyperhomocysteinemia and homocysteinuria
- Hyperprolinemia
- Lead encephalopathy
- Leber's disease
- MELAS syndrome
- MERRF
- Mitochondrial abnormalities (and other inherited or acquired biochemical disorders)
- Neuropathic pain syndromes (e.g. causalgia or painful peripheral neuropathies)
- Nonketotic hyperglycinemia
- Olivopontocerebellar atrophy (some recessive forms)
- Rett syndrome
- Sulfite oxidase deficiency
- Wernicke's encephalopathy

== See also ==
- Antiglutamate receptor antibodies
- Glutamate receptor-interacting protein
- N-Methyl-D-aspartic acid
