= Neurotransmitter receptor =

Type of protein

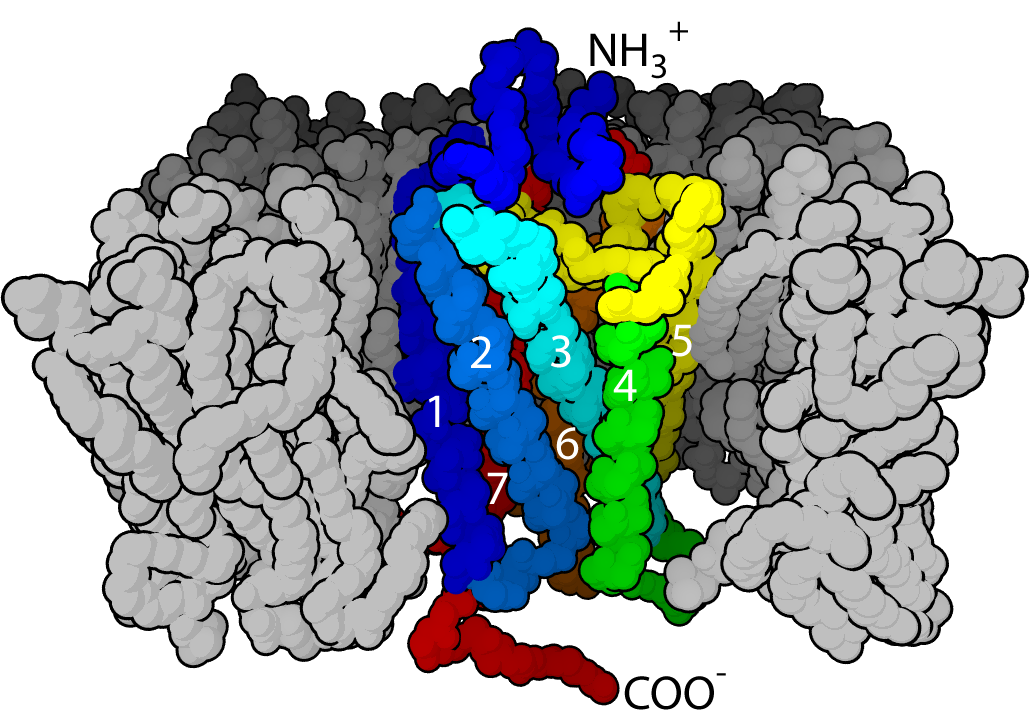
Figure 1. The seven transmembrane α-helix structure of a G-protein-coupled receptor.

A neurotransmitter receptor (also known as a neuroreceptor) is a biochemical receptor that is activated by a neurotransmitter, a type of biomolecule. Chemicals on the outside of the cell, such as a neurotransmitter, can bump into the cell's membrane, in which there are receptors. If a neurotransmitter bumps into its corresponding receptor, they will bind and can trigger other events to occur inside the cell. Therefore, a membrane receptor is part of the molecular machinery that allows cells to communicate with one another. A neurotransmitter receptor is a class of receptors that specifically binds with neurotransmitters as opposed to other molecules.

In postsynaptic cells, neurotransmitter receptors receive signals that trigger an electrical signal, by regulating the activity of ion channels. The influx of ions through ion channels opened due to the binding of neurotransmitters to specific receptors can change the membrane potential of a neuron. This can result in a signal that runs along the axon (see action potential) and is passed along at a synapse to another neuron and possibly on to a neural network. On presynaptic cells, there are receptors known as autoreceptors that are specific to the neurotransmitters released by that cell, which provide feedback and mediate excessive neurotransmitter release from it.

There are two major types of neurotransmitter receptors: ionotropic and metabotropic. Ionotropic means that ions can pass through the receptor, whereas metabotropic means that a second messenger inside the cell relays the message (i.e. metabotropic receptors do not have channels). There are several kinds of metabotropic receptors, including G protein-coupled receptors. Ionotropic receptors are also called ligand-gated ion channels and they can be activated by neurotransmitters (ligands) like glutamate and GABA, which then allow specific ions through the membrane. Sodium ions (that are, for example, allowed passage by the glutamate receptor) excite the post-synaptic cell, while chloride ions (that are, for example, allowed passage by the GABA receptor) inhibit the post-synaptic cell. Inhibition reduces the chance that an action potential will occur, while excitation increases the chance. Conversely, G-protein-coupled receptors are neither excitatory nor inhibitory. Rather, they can have a broad number of functions such as modulating the actions of excitatory and inhibitory ion channels or triggering a signalling cascade that releases calcium from stores inside the cell. Most neurotransmitters receptors are G-protein coupled.

== Localization ==
Neurotransmitter (NT) receptors are located on the surface of neuronal and glial cells. At a synapse, one neuron sends messages to the other neuron via neurotransmitters. Therefore, the postsynaptic neuron, the one receiving the message, clusters NT receptors at this specific place in its membrane. NT receptors can be inserted into any region of the neuron's membrane such as dendrites, axons, and the cell body. Receptors can be located in different parts of the body to act as either an inhibitor or an excitatory receptor for a specific neurotransmitter An example of this are the receptors for the neurotransmitter acetylcholine, one receptor is located at the neuromuscular junction in skeletal muscle to facilitate muscle contraction (excitation), while the other receptor is located in the heart to slow down heart rate (inhibitory)

== Ionotropic receptors: neurotransmitter-gated ion channels ==
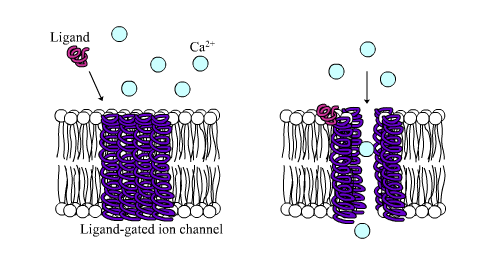
Ligand-gated ion channel

Ligand-gated ion channels (LGICs) are one type of ionotropic receptor or channel-linked receptor. They are a group of transmembrane ion channels that are opened or closed in response to the binding of a chemical messenger (i.e., a ligand), such as a neurotransmitter.

The binding site of endogenous ligands on LGICs protein complexes are normally located on a different portion of the protein (an allosteric binding site) compared to where the ion conduction pore is located. The direct link between ligand binding and opening or closing of the ion channel, which is characteristic of ligand-gated ion channels, is contrasted with the indirect function of metabotropic receptors, which use second messengers. LGICs are also different from voltage-gated ion channels (which open and close in response to changes in membrane potential), and stretch-activated ion channels (which open and close depending on mechanical deformation of the cell membrane).

== Metabotropic receptors: G-protein coupled receptors ==
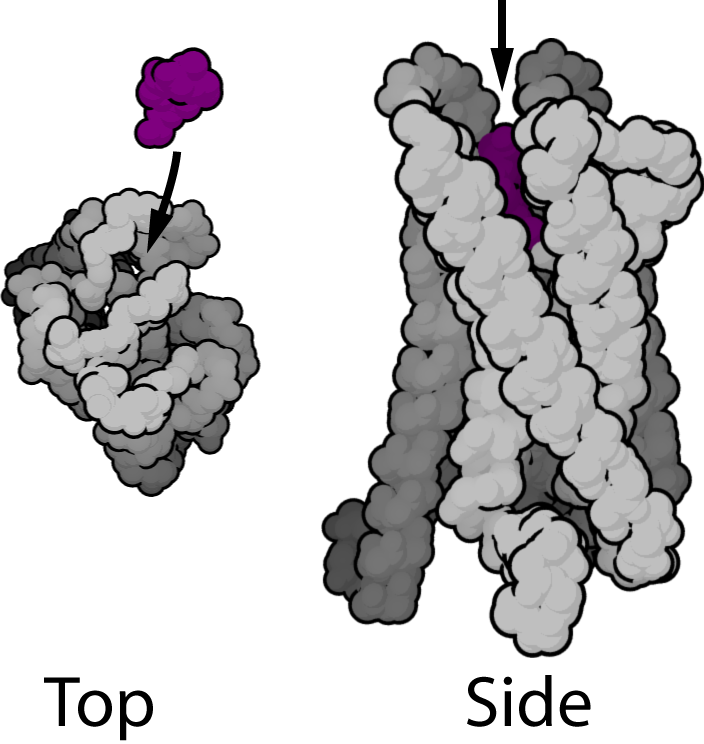
A mu-opioid G-protein-coupled receptor with its agonist

G protein-coupled receptors (GPCRs), also known as seven-transmembrane domain receptors, 7TM receptors, heptahelical receptors, serpentine receptor, and G protein-linked receptors (GPLR), comprise a large protein family of transmembrane receptors that sense molecules outside the cell and activate inside signal transduction pathways and, ultimately, cellular responses. G protein-coupled receptors are found only in eukaryotes, including yeast, choanoflagellates, and animals. The ligands that bind and activate these receptors include light-sensitive compounds, odors, pheromones, hormones, and neurotransmitters, and vary in size from small molecules to peptides to large proteins. G protein-coupled receptors are involved in many diseases, and are also the target of approximately 30% of all modern medicinal drugs.

There are two principal signal transduction pathways involving the G protein-coupled receptors: the cAMP signal pathway and the phosphatidylinositol signal pathway. When a ligand binds to the GPCR it causes a conformational change in the GPCR, which allows it to act as a guanine nucleotide exchange factor (GEF). The GPCR can then activate an associated G-protein by exchanging its bound GDP for a GTP. The G-protein's α subunit, together with the bound GTP, can then dissociate from the β and γ subunits to further affect intracellular signaling proteins or target functional proteins directly depending on the α subunit type (G_{αs}, G_{αi/o}, G_{αq/11}, G_{α12/13}).

== Desensitization and neurotransmitter concentration ==
Neurotransmitter receptors are subject to ligand-induced desensitization: That is, they can become unresponsive upon prolonged exposure to their neurotransmitter. Neurotransmitter receptors are present on both postsynaptic neurons and presynaptic neurons with the former being used to receive neurotransmitters and the latter for the purpose of preventing further release of a given neurotransmitter. In addition to being found in neuron cells, neurotransmitter receptors are also found in various immune and muscle tissues. Many neurotransmitter receptors are categorized as a serpentine receptor or G protein-coupled receptor because they span the cell membrane not once, but seven times. Neurotransmitter receptors are known to become unresponsive to the type of neurotransmitter they receive when exposed for extended periods of time. This phenomenon is known as ligand-induced desensitization or downregulation.

== Example neurotransmitter receptors ==
The following are some major classes of neurotransmitter receptors:

- Adrenergic: α_{1A}, α_{1b}, α_{1c}, α_{1d}, α_{2a}, α_{2b}, α_{2c}, α_{2d}, β_{1}, β_{2}, β_{3}
- Cholinergic:
  - Muscarinic: M_{1}, M_{2}, M_{3}, M_{4}, M_{5}
  - Nicotinic: muscle, neuronal (α-bungarotoxin-insensitive), neuronal (α-bungarotoxin-sensitive)
- Dopaminergic: D_{1}, D_{2}, D_{3}, D_{4}, D_{5}
- GABAergic: GABA_{A}, GABA_{B1a}, GABA_{B1δ}, GABA_{B2}, GABA_{A}-rho
- Glutamatergic: NMDA, AMPA, Kainate, mGluR_{1}, mGluR_{2}, mGluR_{3}, mGluR_{4}, mGluR_{5}, mGluR_{6}, mGluR_{7}
- Glycinergic: Glycine
- Histaminergic: H_{1}, H_{2}, H_{3}. H_{4}
- Opioidergic: μ, δ_{1}, δ_{2}, κ
- Serotonergic: 5-HT_{1A}, 5-HT_{1B}, 5-HT_{1D}, 5-HT_{1E}, 5-HT_{1F}, 5-HT_{2A}, 5-HT_{2B}, 5-HT_{2C}, 5-HT_{3}, 5-HT_{4}, 5-HT_{5}, 5-HT_{6}, 5-HT_{7}

== See also ==
- Autoreceptor
- Catecholamines
- Cholinergic agonists and antagonists
- Heteroreceptor
- Imidazoline receptor
- Neuromuscular transmission
- Synaptic transmission
