= C20H19NO5 =

The molecular formula C_{20}H_{19}NO_{5} (molar mass: 353.37 g/mol, exact mass: 353.1263 u) may refer to:

- Chelidonine
- Lennoxamine
- LY-341,495
- LY-344,545
- Protopine
