= ADX-71149 =

Chemical compound

Clinical data
- ATC code: None

Identifiers
- IUPAC name: 1-Butyl-3-chloro-4-(4-phenylpiperidin-1-yl)-1,2-dihydropyridin-2-one
- CAS Number: 1127498-03-6
- PubChem CID: 25195461
- IUPHAR/BPS: 8946
- ChemSpider: 28424210
- UNII: 612BYT76F3
- ChEMBL: ChEMBL3337527
- CompTox Dashboard (EPA): DTXSID401150484

Chemical and physical data
- Formula: C_{20}H_{25}ClN_{2}O
- Molar mass: 344.88 g·mol^{−1}
- 3D model (JSmol): Interactive image
- SMILES: CCCCN1C=CC(=C(C1=O)Cl)N2CCC(CC2)C3=CC=CC=C3
- InChI: InChI=1S/C20H25ClN2O/c1-2-3-12-23-15-11-18(19(21)20(23)24)22-13-9-17(10-14-22)16-7-5-4-6-8-16/h4-8,11,15,17H,2-3,9-10,12-14H2,1H3; Key:HYOGJHCDLQSAHX-UHFFFAOYSA-N

ADX-71149, also known as JNJ-40411813 and JNJ-mGluR2-PAM, is a selective positive allosteric modulator of the mGlu_{2} receptor. It is being studied by Addex Therapeutics and Janssen Pharmaceuticals for the treatment of schizophrenia. It was also researched by these companies for the treatment of anxious depression (major depressive disorder with anxiety symptoms), but although some efficacy was observed in clinical trials, it was not enough to warrant further development for this indication. As of 2015, ADX-71149 is in phase II clinical trials for schizophrenia.

== See also ==
- List of investigational antidepressants
- List of investigational antipsychotics
- Biphenylindanone A
- Eglumegad
- LY-404,039
- LY-379,268
- LY-487,379
