= CBiPES =

Chemical compound

Clinical data
- ATC code: none

Identifiers
- IUPAC name: N-(4'-cyano-[1,1'-biphenyl]-3-yl-N-(3-pyridinylmethyl)ethanesulfonamide
- CAS Number: 353235-01-5
- PubChem CID: 9864510
- IUPHAR/BPS: 3372
- ChemSpider: 8040202
- UNII: TQ25KB5NW9
- CompTox Dashboard (EPA): DTXSID70432071

Chemical and physical data
- Formula: C_{21}H_{19}N_{3}O_{2}S
- Molar mass: 377.46 g·mol^{−1}
- 3D model (JSmol): Interactive image
- SMILES: N#Cc1ccc(cc1)-c(ccc2)cc2N(S(=O)(=O)CC)Cc3cccnc3
- InChI: InChI=1S/C21H19N3O2S/c1-2-27(25,26)24(16-18-5-4-12-23-15-18)21-7-3-6-20(13-21)19-10-8-17(14-22)9-11-19/h3-13,15H,2,16H2,1H3; Key:HDVYXILCBYGKGU-UHFFFAOYSA-N

CBiPES is a drug used in scientific research that acts as a selective positive allosteric modulator for the metabotropic glutamate receptor group II subtype mGluR_{2}. It has potentially antipsychotic effects in animal models, and is used for researching the role of mGluR_{2} receptors in schizophrenia and related disorders.
