= C4H10NO5P =

The molecular formula C_{4}H_{10}NO_{5}P (molar mass: 183.10 g/mol, exact mass: 183.0297 u) may refer to:

- L-AP4, or L-2-amino-4-phosphonobutyric acid
- Fosmidomycin
