= Quisqualic acid =

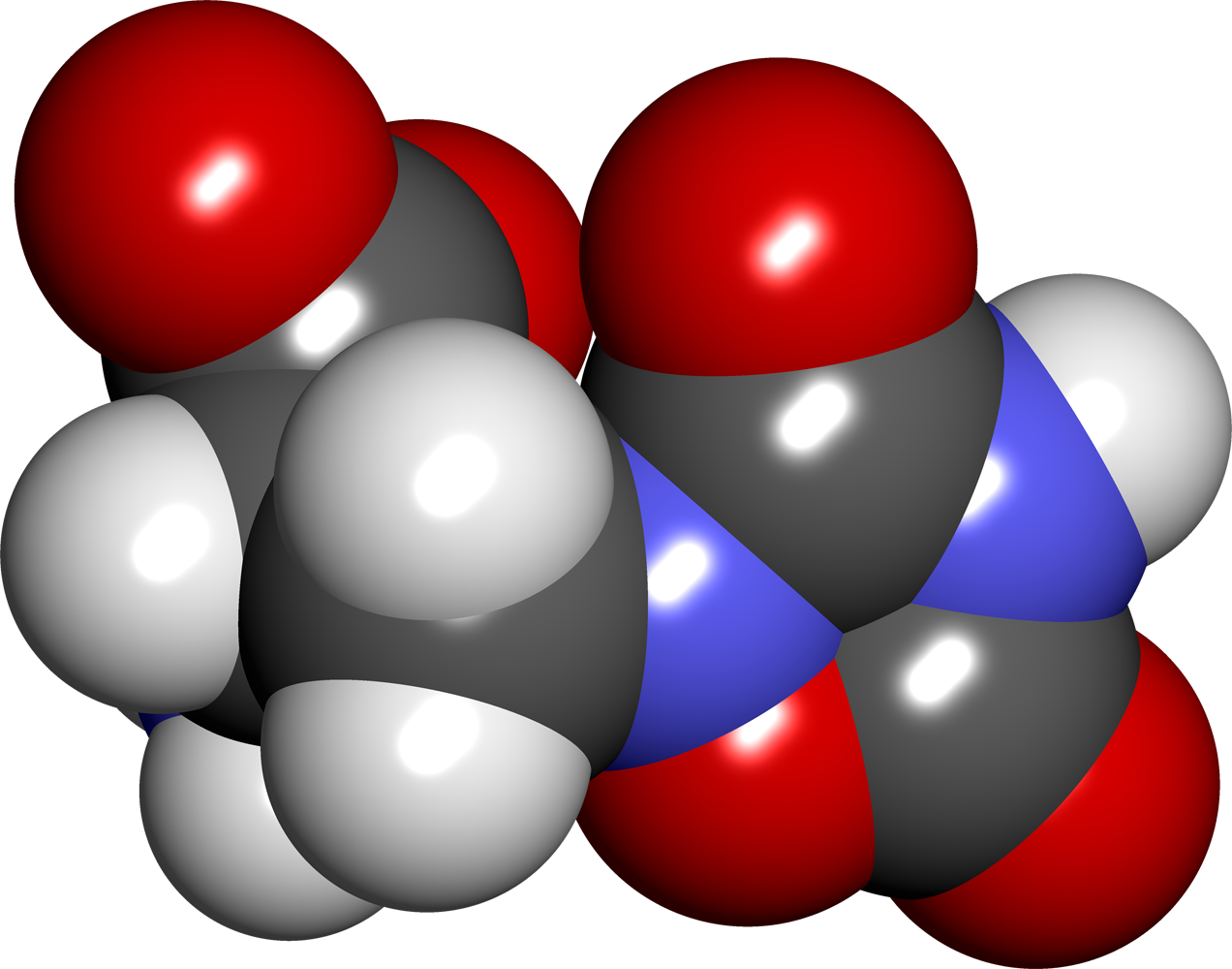

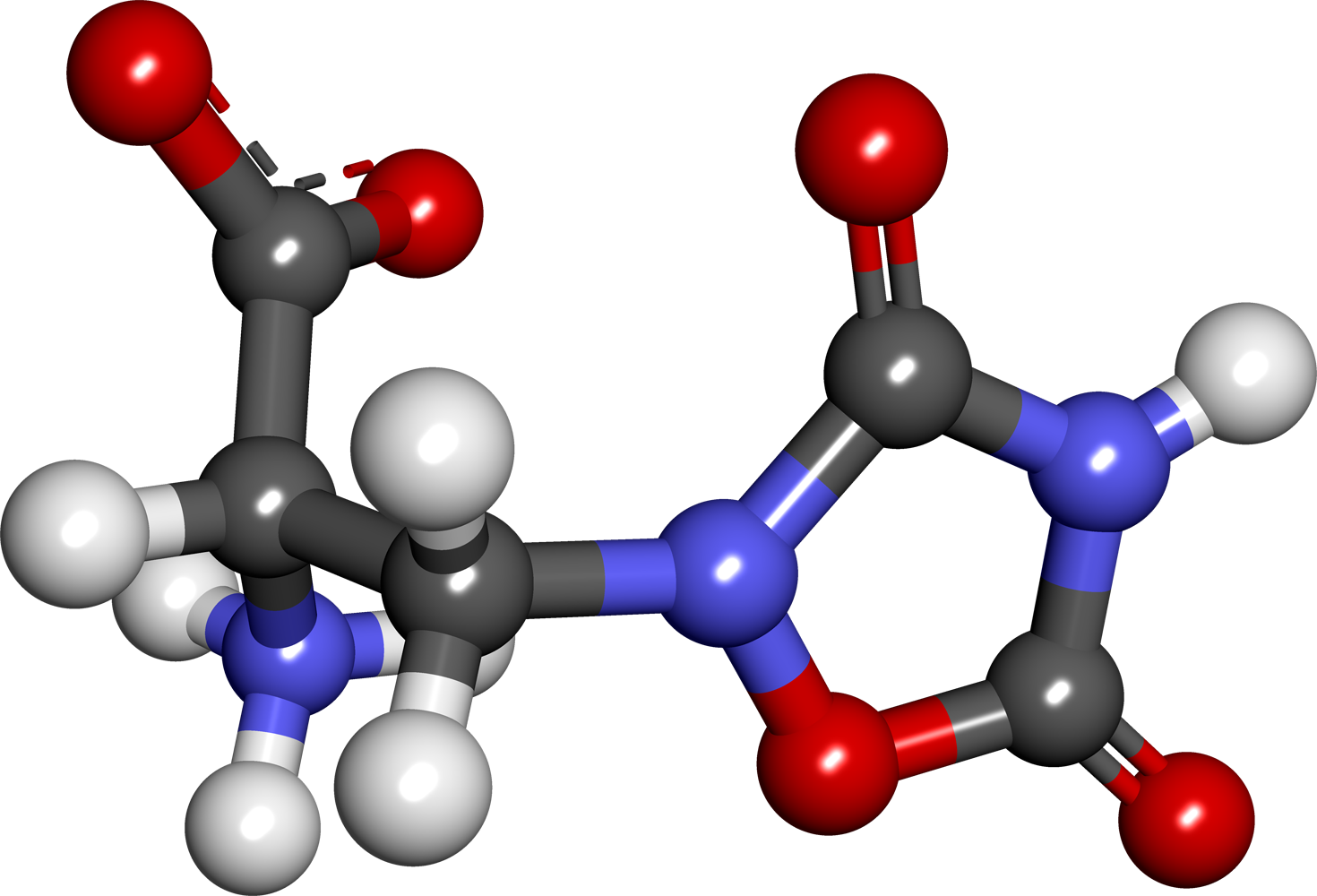

Names
- IUPAC name 3-(3,5-Dioxo-1,2,4-oxadiazolidin-2-yl)-L-alanine
- Systematic IUPAC name (2S)-2-Amino-3-(3,5-dioxo-1,2,4-oxadiazolidin-2-yl)propanoic acid

Identifiers
CAS Number	52809-07-1
3D model (JSmol)	Interactive image
ChEMBL	ChEMBL279956
ChemSpider	37038
DrugBank	DB02999
ECHA InfoCard	100.164.809
EC Number	637-070-2
IUPHAR/BPS	1372; 1370
KEGG	C08296
MeSH	Quisqualic+Acid
PubChem CID	40539
UNII	8OC22C1B99
CompTox Dashboard (EPA)	DTXSID20896927
- InChI: InChI=1S/C5H7N3O5/c6-2(3(9)10)1-8-4(11)7-5(12)13-8/h2H,1,6H2,(H,9,10)(H,7,11,12)/t2-/m0/s1 Key: ASNFTDCKZKHJSW-REOHCLBHSA-N; InChI=1/C5H7N3O5/c6-2(3(9)10)1-8-4(11)7-5(12)13-8/h2H,1,6H2,(H,9,10)(H,7,11,12)/t2-/m0/s1 Key: ASNFTDCKZKHJSW-REOHCLBHBE
- SMILES: O=C1NC(=O)ON1C[C@H](N)C(=O)O

Properties
Chemical formula	C_{5}H_{7}N_{3}O_{5}
Molar mass	189.126 g/mol
Melting point	187 to 188 °C (369 to 370 °F; 460 to 461 K) decomposes

Hazards
- GHS labelling
Pictograms	(GHS07: Exclamation mark)
Signal word	Warning
Hazard statements	H302, H312, H332
Precautionary statements	P261, P264, P270, P271, P280, P301+P317, P302+P352, P304+P340, P317, P321, P330, P362+P364, P501
- Except where otherwise noted, data are given for materials in their standard state (at 25 °C [77 °F], 100 kPa). verify (what is ?) Infobox references

Quisqualic acid is an agonist of the AMPA, kainate, and group I metabotropic glutamate receptors. It is one of the most potent AMPA receptor agonists known. It causes excitotoxicity and is used in neuroscience to selectively destroy neurons in the brain or spinal cord. Quisqualic acid occurs naturally in the seeds of Quisqualis species.

Research conducted by the USDA Agricultural Research Service, has demonstrated quisqualic acid is also present within the flower petals of zonal geranium (Pelargonium x hortorum) and is responsible for causing rigid paralysis of the Japanese beetle. Quisqualic acid is thought to mimic L-glutamic acid, which is a neurotransmitter in the insect neuromuscular junction and mammalian central nervous system.

== Natural extract ==
Combretum indicum (Quisqualis indica var. villosa) is native to tropical Asia but is still doubt whether is indigenous from Africa or was introduced there. Since the amino acid that can be isolated from its fruits can nowadays be made in the lab, the plant is mostly cultivated as an ornamental plant.

In natural medicine tradition Quisqualis indica has an anthelmintic effect, therefore they are used to treat round worm infection.

Quisqualic acid resembles the action of the anthelmintic α-santonin, so in some countries the seeds of the plants are used to substitute for the drug. However, the acid has shown excitatory effects on cultured neurons, as well as in a variety of animal models, as it causes several types of limbic seizures and neuronal necrosis.

The quisqualic acid can be now commercially synthesized, and it functions as an antagonist for its receptor, found in the mammalian central nervous system.

== Chemistry ==
=== Structure ===
It is an organic compound, associated with the class of L-alpha-amino acids. These compounds have the L-configuration of the alpha carbon atom.

Quisqualic acid contains, in its structure a five membered, planar, conjugated, aromatic heterocyclic system, consisting of one oxygen atom and two nitrogen atoms at position 2 and 4 of the oxadiazole ring. The 1,2,4–oxadiazole ring structure is present in many natural products of pharmacological importance. Quisqualic acid, which is extracted from the seeds of Quisqualis indica, is a strong antagonist of AMPA receptors.

=== Reactivity and synthesis ===
==== Biosynthesis ====
L-Quisqualic acid is a glutamate receptor agonist, acting at AMPA receptors and metabotropic glutamate receptors positively linked to phosphoinositide hydrolysis. It sensitizes neurons in hippocampus to depolarization by L-AP6.

Being a 3,5-disubstituted oxadiazole, quisqualic acid is a stable compound.

One way of synthesizing quisqualic acid is by enzymatic synthesis. Therefore, cysteine synthase is purified from the leaves of Quisqualis indica var. villosa, showing two forms of this enzyme. Both isolated isoenzymes catalyse the formation of cysteine from O-acetyl-L-serine and hydrogen sulphide, but only one of them catalyses the formation of L–quisqualic acid.

==== Industrial synthesis ====
Another way of synthesizing the product is by having L-serine as starting material.

== Functions ==
=== Molecular mechanisms of action ===
Quisqualic acid is functionally similar to glutamate, which is an endogenous agonist of glutamate's receptors. It functions as a neurotransmitter in insect neuromuscular junction and CNS. It passes the blood brain barrier and binds to cell surface receptors AMPA and Kainate receptors in the brain.

AMPA receptor is a type of ionotropic glutamate receptor coupled to ion channels and when bound to a ligand, it modulates the excitability by gating the flow of calcium and sodium ions into the intracellular domain. On the other hand, kainate receptors are less understood than AMPA receptors. Although, the function is somewhat similar: the ion channel permeates the flow of sodium and potassium ions, and to a lower extent the Calcium ions.

As mentioned, binding of quisqualic acid to these receptors leads to an influx of calcium and sodium ions into the neurons, which triggers downstream signaling cascades. Calcium signaling involves protein effectors such as kinases (CaMK, MAPK/ERKs), CREB-transcription factor and various phosphatases. It regulates gene expression and may modify the properties of the receptors.

Sodium and calcium ions together generate an excitatory postsynaptic potential (EPSP) that triggers action potentials. It's worthwhile to mention that overactivation of glutamate receptors and kainate receptors lead to excitotoxicity and neurological damage.

A greater dose of quisqualic acid over activates these receptors that can induce seizures, due to prolonged action potentials firing the neurons. Quisqualic acid is also associated with various neurological disorders such as epilepsy and stroke.

Metabotropic glutamate receptors, also known as mGluRs are a type of glutamate receptor which are members of the G-protein coupled receptors. These receptors are important in neural communication, memory formation, learning and regulation. Like Glutamate, quisqualic acid binds to this receptor and shows even a higher potency, mainly for mGlu1 and mGlu5 and exert its effects through a complex second messenger system. Activation of these receptors leads to an increase in inositol triphosphate (IP3) and diacylglycerol (DAG) by the activation of phospholipase C (PLC). Eventually, IP3 diffuses to bind to IP3 receptors on the ER, which are calcium channels that eventually increase the Calcium concentration in the cell.

==== Modulation of NMDA receptor ====
The effects of quisqualic acid depend on the location and context. These 2 receptors are known to potentiate the activity of N-methyl-D-aspartate receptors (NMDARs), a certain type of ion channel that is a neurotoxic. Excessive amounts of NMDA have been found to cause harm to the neurons in the presence of mGlu1 and mGlu5 receptors.

==== Effects on plasticity ====
Activation of group 1 mGluRs are implicated in synaptic plasticity and contribute to both neurotoxicity and neuroprotection such as protection of the retina against NMDA toxicity, mentioned above. It causes a reduction in ZENK expression, which leads to myopia in chicken.

==== Role in disease ====
Studies on mice have suggested that mGlu1 may be involved in the development of certain cancers. Knowing that these types of receptors are mostly localized in the thalamus, hypothalamus and caudate nucleus regions of the brain, the overactivation of these receptors by quisqualic acid can suggest a potential role in movement disorders.

Family	Type	Mechanism
AMPA	ionotropic	Increase membrane permeability for sodium, calcium, and potassium
Kainate	ionotropic	Increase membrane permeability for sodium and potassium
NMDA	ionotropic	Increase membrane permeability for calcium
Metabotropic Group 1	G-coupled proteins	Activation of phospholipase C: increase of IP3 and DAG

=== Use/purpose, availability, efficacy, side effects/ adverse effects ===
Quisqualic acid is an excitatory amino acid (EAA) and a potent agonist of metabotropic glutamate receptors, where evidence shows that activation of these receptors may cause a long lasting sensitization of neurons to depolarization, a phenomenon called the “Quis effect ”.

Quisqualic acid has strong excitatory effects in the spinal cords of frogs and rats as well as on the neuromuscular junction in crayfish. As template for excitotoxic models of spinal cord injury, quisqualic acid can cause excessive activation of glutamate receptors, leading to neuronal damage and loss. This excitotoxic model has been used to study the mechanisms of injury and to develop potential treatments for related conditions. Several experimental studies have demonstrated the similarity between the pathology and symptoms induced by quisqualic acid injections and those observed in clinical spinal cord injuries.

After administration of quis-injection, spinal neurons located close to areas of neuronal degeneration and cavitation exhibit a decrease in mechanical threshold, meaning they become more sensitive to mechanical stimuli. This heightened sensitivity is accompanied by prolonged after discharge responses. These results suggest that excitatory amino acid agonists can induce morphological changes in the spinal cord, which can lead to physiological changes in adjacent neurons, ultimately resulting in altered mechanosensitivity.

There is evidence to suggest that excitatory amino acids like quisqualic acid play a significant role in the induction of cell death following stroke, hypoxia-ischemia, and traumatic brain injury .

Studies involving the binding of quisqualic acid have indicated that the amino acid does not show selectivity for a singular specific receptor subtype, which was initially identified as the quisqualate receptor. Instead, it demonstrates high affinity for other types of excitatory amino acid receptors, including kainate, AMPA, and metabotropic receptors, as well as some transport sites, such as the chloride-dependent L-AP4-sensitive sites. In addition, it also exhibits affinity for certain enzymes responsible for cleaving dipeptides, including the enzyme responsible for cleaving N-acetyl-aspartylglutamate (NAALADase) .

Regarding bioavailability, no database information is present, as there is limited research on its pharmacokinetics. However, even though the bioavailability is not well established, studies in rats suggest that age may play a role in the presence of administered quisqualic acid effects. An experiment which was done on rats within two age groups (20-days-old and 60-days-old) showed that, when given quisqualic acid microinjections, 60-day-old rats had more seizures compared to the younger rats. Additionally, the rats were given the same amount of quisqualic acid, however the immature animals received a higher dosage per body weight, implying that the harm inflicted by the excitatory amino acid may have been comparatively lower in the younger animals.

== Metabolism/Biotransformation ==
Quisqualic acid enters the body through different routes, such as ingestion, inhalation, or injection. The ADME (absorption, distribution, metabolism and excretion) process has been studied by means of various animal models in the laboratory.

Absorption: quisqualic acid is a small and lipophilic molecule, thus is expected to be rapid. It is predicted to be absorbed in the human intestine and from then it circulates to the blood brain barrier. Analysis of amino acid transport systems is complex by the presence of multiple transporters with overlapping specificity. Since glutamate and quisqualic acid are similar, it is predicted that sodium/potassium transport in the gastrointestinal tract is the absorption site of the acid.

Distribution: knowing the receptors it binds to, it can be readily predicted where the acid is present such as: hippocampus, basal ganglia, olfactory regions.

Metabolism: quisqualic acid is thought to be metabolized in the liver by oxidative metabolism carried out by cytochrome P450 enzymes, Glutathione S-transferase (detoxifying agents). A study showed that the exposure to quisqualic acid revealed that P450, GST were involved. It is also confirmed by using admetSAR tool to evaluate chemical ADMET properties. Its metabolites are thought to be NMDA and quinolinic acid.

Excretion: Mostly, as a rule of thumb, amino acids undergo transamination/deamination in the liver. Thus amino acids are converted into ammonia and keto acids, which are eventually excreted via the kidneys.

It is worth mentioning that the pharmacokinetics of quisqualic acid has not been extensively studied and there is sparse information available on its ADME process. Therefore, more research is needed to fully understand the metabolism of the acid in the body.

== See also ==
- Quisqualamine
- Non-proteinogenic amino acids
