= (3,5-dihydroxyphenyl)acetyl-CoA 1,2-dioxygenase =

Enzyme

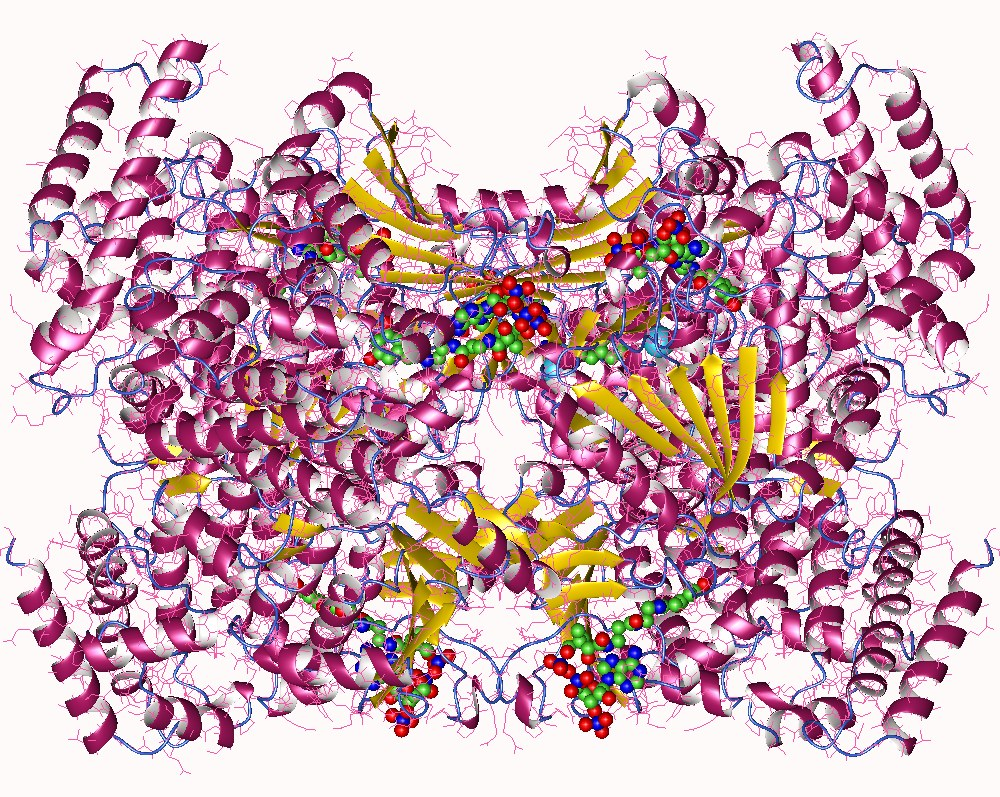
- 3,5-dihydroxyphenylacetyl-CoA 1,2-dioxygenase hexamer, Streptomyces toyocaensis

Identifiers
- EC no.: 1.13.11.80

Databases
- IntEnz: IntEnz view
- BRENDA: BRENDA entry
- ExPASy: NiceZyme view
- KEGG: KEGG entry
- MetaCyc: metabolic pathway
- PRIAM: profile
- PDB structures: RCSB PDB PDBe PDBsum
Search
- PMC: articles
- PubMed: articles
- NCBI: proteins

(3,5-dihydroxyphenyl)acetyl-CoA 1,2-dioxygenase (EC 1.13.11.80, DpgC) is an enzyme catalyses the following chemical reaction

(3,5-dihydroxyphenyl)acetyl-CoA + O_{2} ⇌ 2-(3,5-dihydroxyphenyl)-2-oxoacetate + CoA.

This enzyme is involved in the biosynthesis of the nonproteinogenic amino acid (S)-3,5-dihydroxyphenylglycine (Dpg) responsible of the production of vancomycin and teicoplanin antibiotics. It catalyzes the unusual conversion 3,5-dihydroxyphenylacetyl-CoA (DPA-CoA) to 3,5-dihydroxyphenylglyoxylate.
