= DPG =

DPG may refer to

- Defense Planning Guidance provides basis for the U.S. National Military Strategy
- Democratic Party of Georgia an affiliate of the Democratic Party in the state of Georgia
- Diplomatic Protection Group is a branch of the London Metropolitan Police
- Deutsche Physikalische Gesellschaft - German Physical Society
- Deutsche Phytomedizinische Gesellschaft - German Phytomedicine Society
- Deutsche Postgewerkschaft - former German trade union
- Tha Dogg Pound (Dogg Pound Gangstaz), a gangsta rap group
- DPG Media, a Belgian multinational media company
- D.P.G. Recordz, a record label
- Drip proof guarded motor
- Dugway Proving Ground, a US Army chemical and biological testing facility
- Dulwich Picture Gallery, London, UK
- A chemical mixture dipropylene glycol, used in industry
- A metabolite 1,3-bisphosphoglycerate in glycolysis
- A chemical 2,3-Bisphosphoglycerate (2,3-diphosphoglycerate), involved in hemoglobin-oxygen binding
- Dihydroxyphenylglycine, an amino acid
- Digital pair gain, a telecommunications term for delivering multiple phone lines over a single copper pair
- An abbreviation for doubleplusgood, Orwellian neologism for excellent
- Deck-type Plate Girder, a construction method for bridges
