= APICA =

APICA or Apica may refer to:

== Toponyms ==
- Apica River, stream in Charlevoix Regional County Municipality, Capitale-Nationale, Quebec, Canada
- Mont-Apica, Quebec, unorganized territory in Lac-Saint-Jean-Est Regional County Municipality, Saguenay–Lac-Saint-Jean, Quebec, Canada
  - RCAF Station Mont Apica, a radar station Mont-Apica, Quebec

== Chemistry ==
- 1-Amino-5-phosphonoindan-1-carboxylic acid, also known as APICA
- APICA (synthetic cannabinoid drug) (N-(1-adamantyl)-1-pentyl-1H-indole-3-carboxamide))
