= PCCG-4 =

Chemical compound

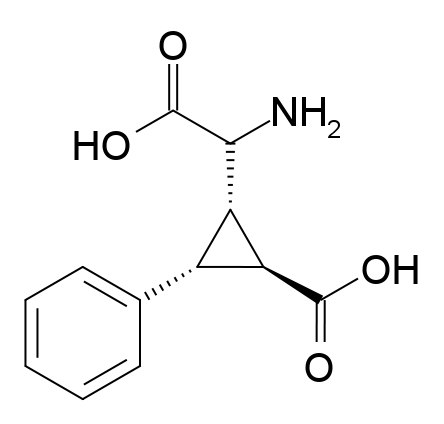

Identifiers
- IUPAC name: (2S,1'S,2'S,3'R)-2-(2'Carboxy-3'-phenylcyclopropyl)glycine
- CAS Number: 177188-14-6
- PubChem CID: 5311344
- IUPHAR/BPS: 3335
- ChemSpider: 4470843
- ChEMBL: ChEMBL39573
- CompTox Dashboard (EPA): DTXSID201029619

Chemical and physical data
- Formula: C_{12}H_{13}NO_{4}
- Molar mass: 235.239 g·mol^{−1}
- 3D model (JSmol): Interactive image
- SMILES: C1=CC=C(C=C1)[C@@H]2[C@@H]([C@H]2C(=O)O)[C@@H](C(=O)O)N
- InChI: InChI=1S/C12H13NO4/c13-10(12(16)17)8-7(9(8)11(14)15)6-4-2-1-3-5-6/h1-5,7-10H,13H2,(H,14,15)(H,16,17)/t7-,8+,9+,10+/m1/s1; Key:IFLWVSHRWAIVQF-KATARQTJSA-N

PCCG-4 is a research drug which acts as a selective antagonist for the group II metabotropic glutamate receptors (mGluR_{2/3}), with slight selectivity for mGluR_{2} although not sufficient to distinguish mGluR_{2} and mGluR_{3} responses from each other. It is used in research into the function of the group II metabotropic glutamate receptors.
