= Decoglurant =

Chemical compound

Clinical data
- Other names: RG1578 and RO4995819
- ATC code: none

Legal status
- Legal status: Development terminated

Identifiers
- IUPAC name: 5-({7-(Trifluoromethyl)-5-[4-(trifluoromethyl)phenyl]pyrazolo[1,5-a]pyrimidin-3-yl}ethynyl)-2-pyridinamine
- CAS Number: 911115-16-7
- PubChem CID: 71533696
- ChemSpider: 32695160
- UNII: 5VX4P0JKC5
- KEGG: D10875
- CompTox Dashboard (EPA): DTXSID001031872

Chemical and physical data
- Formula: C_{21}H_{11}F_{6}N_{5}
- Molar mass: 447.344 g·mol^{−1}
- 3D model (JSmol): Interactive image
- SMILES: C1=CC(=CC=C1C2=NC3=C(C=NN3C(=C2)C(F)(F)F)C#CC4=CN=C(C=C4)N)C(F)(F)F
- InChI: InChI=1S/C21H11F6N5/c22-20(23,24)15-6-4-13(5-7-15)16-9-17(21(25,26)27)32-19(31-16)14(11-30-32)3-1-12-2-8-18(28)29-10-12/h2,4-11H,(H2,28,29); Key:DMJHZVARRXJSEG-UHFFFAOYSA-N

Decoglurant (INN; development codes RG1578 and RO4995819) is a negative allosteric modulator of the mGlu_{2} and mGlu_{3} receptors which was under development by Roche for the adjunctive treatment of major depressive disorder. Decoglurant progressed as far as phase II clinical trials but was ultimately discontinued from further development due to disappointing efficacy results.

== See also ==
- Basimglurant
- RO4491533
