= C7H13NO4 =

The molecular formula C_{7}H_{13}NO_{4} (molar mass: 175.18 g/mol, exact mass: 175.0845 u) may refer to:

- Valienamine
- EGLU
- SerBut
