= Carmen Scheibenbogen =

German immunologist

Carmen Scheibenbogen (born 16 March 1962) is a German immunologist who is the acting director of the Institute for Medical Immunology of the Charité university hospital in Berlin. She specialises in hematology (blood and blood diseases), oncology and immunology. She leads the Outpatient Clinic for Immunodeficiency and the Fatigue Centre at the Charité hospital. She is one of the few doctors specialised in myalgic encephalomyelitis/chronic fatigue syndrome (ME/CFS) in Germany, and also researches long COVID.

== Career ==
Scheibenborgen started her study of medicine in Bonn in 1982 and finished it in Marburg. During her studies she spent half a year in Denver in the US, working in a hospital there, and developed a passion for the immune system. She continued as a research assistant at the University of Freiburg, and trained in rheumatology and hemo-oncology in Heidelberg.

In 1998 she founded a group around tumor immunology at the Charité university hospital in Berlin, and became the director of the Institute of Immunology there in 2007. Her work moved towards care for myalgic encephalomyelitis/chronic fatigue syndrome a few years later, and after realising care options were limited, focussed on expanding these. In 2015 she founded the European Network on ME/CFS and three years later she opened the Charité Fatigue Centre. She received a €10 million grant build a study group to test treatments for people with ME/CFS from the German Federal Ministry of Education and Research.

In 2022, she received the German Cross of Merit for her work around ME/CFS. Patients and their family had put her name forward to be considered.

== Research ==
Scheibenborgen studies the role of autoimmunity in ME/CFS. Her group found that in a subset of people with ME/CFS, there are autoantibodies to neurotransmitter and nuclear receptors. She hypothesized in a series of papers with Klaus Wirth that autoimmunity may explain the diverse symptoms of ME/CFS in a subset of patients, including muscle weakness and the neurological symptoms.

Since the start of the COVID-19 pandemic, she has researched therapeutic options for people with long COVID.

== Selected publications ==
- Leser HG, Gross V, Scheibenbogen C, et al. (September 1991). "Elevation of serum interleukin-6 concentration precedes acute-phase response and reflects severity in acute pancreatitis". Gastroenterology. 101 (3): 782–5. doi:10.1016/0016-5085(91)90539-w. PMID 1907253.
- Nagorsen D, Scheibenbogen C, Marincola FM, et al. (October 2003). "Natural T cell immunity against cancer". Clinical Cancer Research. 9 (12): 4296–303. PMID 14555498.
- Rasa S, Nora-Krukle Z, Henning N, Eliassen E, Shikova E, Harrer T, Scheibenbogen C, Murovska M, Prusty BK (October 2018). "Chronic viral infections in myalgic encephalomyelitis/chronic fatigue syndrome (ME/CFS)". Journal of Translational Medicine. 16 (1): 268. doi:10.1186/s12967-018-1644-y. PMC 6167797. PMID 30285773.
- Sotzny F, Blanco J, Capelli E, Castro-Marrero J, Steiner S, Murovska M, Scheibenbogen C (June 2018). "Myalgic Encephalomyelitis/Chronic Fatigue Syndrome – Evidence for an autoimmune disease". Autoimmunity Reviews. 17 (6): 601–609. doi:10.1016/j.autrev.2018.01.009. PMID 29635081.
- Kedor C, Freitag H, Meyer-Arndt L, Wittke K, Hanitsch LG, Zoller T, Steinbeis F, Haffke M, Rudolf G, Heidecker B, Bobbert T, Spranger J, Volk HD, Skurk C, Konietschke F, Paul F, Behrends U, Bellmann-Strobl J, Scheibenbogen C (August 2022). "A prospective observational study of post-COVID-19 chronic fatigue syndrome following the first pandemic wave in Germany and biomarkers associated with symptom severity". Nature Communications. 13 (1): 5104. Bibcode:2022NatCo..13.5104K. doi:10.1038/s41467-022-32507-6. PMC 9426365. PMID 36042189.
