= GRIN3A =

Protein-coding gene in the species Homo sapiens

Identifiers
- Aliases: GRIN3A, GluN3A, NMDAR-L, NR3A, glutamate ionotropic receptor NMDA type subunit 3A, NMDAR3A
- External IDs: OMIM: 606650; MGI: 1933206; GeneCards: GRIN3A

Gene location (Human)
Chr.	Chromosome 9 (human)
Band	9q31.1	Start	101,569,352 bp
Band	9q31.1	End	101,738,647 bp

Gene location (Mouse)
Chr.	Chromosome 4 (mouse)
Band	4|4 B1	Start	49,661,611 bp
Band	4|4 B1	End	49,845,744 bp
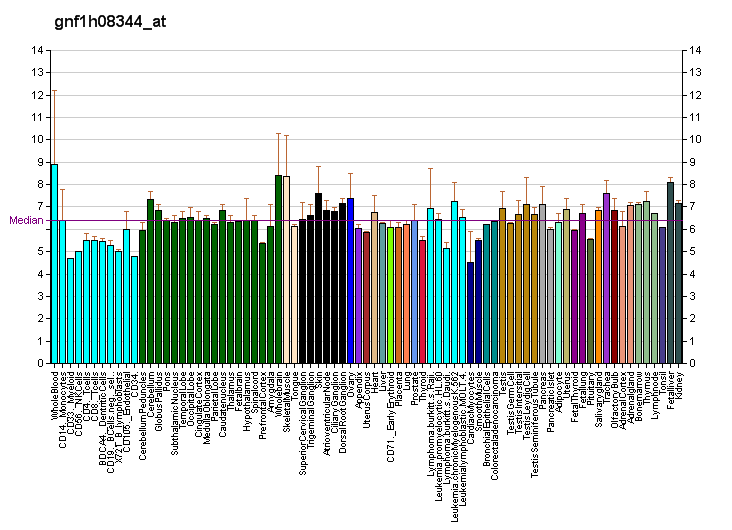

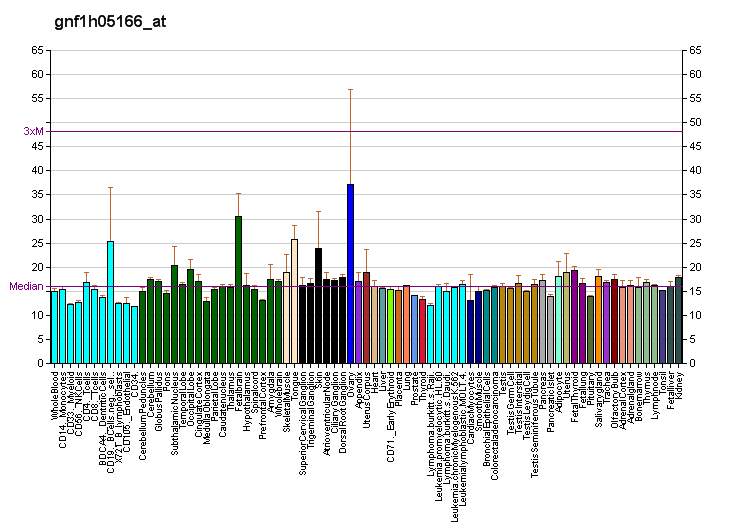
RNA expression pattern
Bgee	Human / Mouse (ortholog); Top expressed in: Brodmann area 46; middle temporal gyrus; testicle; Brodmann area 23; prefrontal cortex; pars compacta; entorhinal cortex; dorsolateral prefrontal cortex; cingulate gyrus; anterior cingulate cortex / Top expressed in: phalanx of second toe; subiculum; habenula; dorsomedial hypothalamic nucleus; supraoptic nucleus; anterior amygdaloid area; phalanx of third toe; paraventricular nucleus of hypothalamus; medial dorsal nucleus; pontine nuclei; More reference expression data
BioGPS	More reference expression data
Gene ontology
Molecular function	glycine binding; identical protein binding; protein phosphatase 2A binding; ion channel activity; extracellularly glutamate-gated ion channel activity; calcium channel activity; ionotropic glutamate receptor activity; protein binding; NMDA glutamate receptor activity; signaling receptor activity; transmitter-gated ion channel activity involved in regulation of postsynaptic membrane potential
Cellular component	synapse; integral component of membrane; NMDA selective glutamate receptor complex; cell junction; neuron projection; postsynaptic density; postsynaptic membrane; membrane; soma; plasma membrane; glutamatergic synapse
Biological process	calcium ion transport; dendrite development; response to ethanol; prepulse inhibition; ion transport; calcium ion transmembrane transport; ionotropic glutamate receptor signaling pathway; ion transmembrane transport; excitatory postsynaptic potential; signal transduction; regulation of postsynaptic membrane potential; regulation of synaptic vesicle exocytosis
Sources:Amigo / QuickGO
Orthologs
Databases	NCBI: entry; OMA: entry
Species	Human	Mouse
Entrez	116443	242443
Ensembl	ENSG00000198785	ENSMUSG00000039579
UniProt	Q8TCU5	A2AIR5
RefSeq (mRNA)	NM_133445	NM_001033351; NM_001276355
RefSeq (protein)	NP_597702	NP_001028523; NP_001263284
Location (UCSC)	Chr 9: 101.57 – 101.74 Mb	Chr 4: 49.66 – 49.85 Mb
PubMed search
- Wikidata
View/Edit Human	View/Edit Mouse

Glutamate [NMDA] receptor subunit 3A is a protein that in humans is encoded by the GRIN3A gene.

== Function ==
This gene encodes a subunit of the N-methyl-D-aspartate (NMDAR) receptors, which belong to the superfamily of glutamate-regulated ion channels, and function in physiological and pathological processes in the central nervous system. This subunit shows greater than 90% identity to the corresponding subunit in rat. Studies in the knockout mouse deficient in this subunit suggest that this gene may be involved in the development of synaptic elements by modulating NMDA receptor activity.

== See also ==
- NMDA receptor
