= LY-487,379 =

Chemical compound

Clinical data
- ATC code: none

Identifiers
- IUPAC name: N-(4-(2-methoxyphenoxy)phenyl)- N-(2,2,2-trifluoroethylsulfonyl)pyrid- 3-ylmethylamine
- CAS Number: 353231-17-1
- PubChem CID: 9825084
- IUPHAR/BPS: 1402
- ChemSpider: 8000831
- UNII: 7WF5ZLL4D9
- ChEMBL: ChEMBL108939
- CompTox Dashboard (EPA): DTXSID10431366

Chemical and physical data
- Formula: C_{21}H_{19}F_{3}N_{2}O_{4}S
- Molar mass: 452.45 g·mol^{−1}
- 3D model (JSmol): Interactive image
- SMILES: c3ncccc3CN(S(=O)(=O)CC(F)(F)F)c2ccc(cc2)Oc1ccccc1OC
- InChI: InChI=1S/C21H19F3N2O4S/c1-29-19-6-2-3-7-20(19)30-18-10-8-17(9-11-18)26(14-16-5-4-12-25-13-16)31(27,28)15-21(22,23)24/h2-13H,14-15H2,1H3; Key:ALMACYDZFBMGOR-UHFFFAOYSA-N

LY-487,379 is a drug used in scientific research that acts as a selective positive allosteric modulator for the metabotropic glutamate receptor group II subtype mGluR_{2}. It is used to study the structure and function of this receptor subtype, and LY-487,379 along with various other mGluR_{2/3} agonists and positive modulators are being investigated as possible antipsychotic and anxiolytic drugs.

== See also ==
- Eglumegad
- HYDIA
