= LY-344545 =

Chemical compound

Identifiers
- IUPAC name: (αS)-α-Amino-α-[(1R,2R)-2-carboxycyclopropyl]-9H-xanthene-9-propanoic acid
- CAS Number: 201851-20-9
- PubChem CID: 10618042
- ChemSpider: 8793407
- UNII: 9ZSQ1C4209

Chemical and physical data
- Formula: C_{20}H_{19}NO_{5}
- Molar mass: 353.374 g·mol^{−1}
- 3D model (JSmol): Interactive image
- SMILES: c1ccc2c(c1)C(c3ccccc3O2)C[C@]([C@@H]4C[C@H]4C(=O)O)(C(=O)O)N
- InChI: InChI=1S/C20H19NO5/c21-20(19(24)25,15-9-13(15)18(22)23)10-14-11-5-1-3-7-16(11)26-17-8-4-2-6-12(14)17/h1-8,13-15H,9-10,21H2,(H,22,23)(H,24,25)/t13-,15-,20+/m1/s1; Key:VLZBRVJVCCNPRJ-RCDCFZSISA-N

LY-344,545 is a research drug developed by the pharmaceutical company Eli Lilly, which acts as an antagonist for the metabotropic glutamate receptor subtype mGluR_{5}. It is an epimer of another metabotropic glutamate receptor antagonist, the mGluR_{2/3}-selective LY-341,495.
