= 1-Amino-5-phosphonoindan-1-carboxylic acid =

Chemical compound used in neuroscience research

APICA

Clinical data
- ATC code: none

Identifiers
- IUPAC name: 1-Amino-5-phosphonoindan-1-carboxylic acid
- CAS Number: 170847-18-4
- PubChem CID: 4694355
- ChemSpider: 3881975
- UNII: XU3SFK6GGN
- ChEMBL: ChEMBL277961
- CompTox Dashboard (EPA): DTXSID201028297

Chemical and physical data
- Formula: C_{10}H_{12}NO_{5}P
- Molar mass: 257.182 g·mol^{−1}
- 3D model (JSmol): Interactive image
- SMILES: O=P(O)(O)c(c2)ccc1c2CCC1(N)C(O)=O
- InChI: InChI=1S/C10H12NO5P/c11-10(9(12)13)4-3-6-5-7(17(14,15)16)1-2-8(6)10/h1-2,5H,3-4,11H2,(H,12,13)(H2,14,15,16); Key:ZNQZXIHSJUDIKL-UHFFFAOYSA-N

1-Amino-5-phosphonoindan-1-carboxylic acid (APICA) is a drug that is used in neuroscience research. It is a selective antagonist for the group II metabotropic glutamate receptors (mGluR_{2/3}), and has been useful in the study of this receptor subfamily.
