= RO4491533 =

Chemical compound

Clinical data
- ATC code: None

Legal status
- Legal status: In general: non-regulated

Identifiers
- IUPAC name: 4-[3-(2,6-dimethylpyridin-4-yl)phenyl]-7-methyl-8-trifluoromethyl-1,3-dihydrobenzo[b][1,4]diazepin-2-one
- CAS Number: 579482-31-8
- PubChem CID: 11158623
- IUPHAR/BPS: 6226
- ChemSpider: 9333726
- UNII: HF59BT62UG
- CompTox Dashboard (EPA): DTXSID601030327

Chemical and physical data
- Formula: C_{24}H_{20}F_{3}N_{3}O
- Molar mass: 423.439 g·mol^{−1}
- 3D model (JSmol): Interactive image
- SMILES: n3c(C)cc(cc3C)-c(ccc4)cc4C(=Nc1cc2C)CC(=O)Nc1cc2C(F)(F)F
- InChI: InChI=1S/C24H20F3N3O/c1-13-7-21-22(11-19(13)24(25,26)27)30-23(31)12-20(29-21)17-6-4-5-16(10-17)18-8-14(2)28-15(3)9-18/h4-11H,12H2,1-3H3,(H,30,31); Key:LYTVXCQQTLUEQR-UHFFFAOYSA-N

RO-4491533 is a drug developed by Hoffmann-La Roche which acts as a potent and selective negative allosteric modulator for group II of the metabotropic glutamate receptors (mGluR_{2/3}), being equipotent at mGluR_{2} and mGluR_{3} but without activity at other mGluR subtypes. In animal studies, RO-4491533 produced antidepressant effects and reversed the effects of the mGluR_{2/3} agonist LY-379,268 with similar efficacy but slightly lower potency than the mGluR_{2/3} antagonist LY-341,495. A number of related compounds are known, with similar effects in vitro and a fairly well characterized structure-activity relationship.

== See also ==
- Decoglurant
