= MGS-0039 =

Chemical compound

Clinical data
- ATC code: None

Legal status
- Legal status: In general: non-regulated

Identifiers
- IUPAC name: (1R,2R,3R,5R,6R)-2-amino-3-(3,4-dichlorobenzyloxy)-6-fluorobicyclo[3.1.0]hexane-2,6-dicarboxylic acid
- CAS Number: 569686-87-9
- PubChem CID: 9886034
- IUPHAR/BPS: 1397
- ChemSpider: 8061707
- UNII: M8KC1PQ31A
- CompTox Dashboard (EPA): DTXSID40432407

Chemical and physical data
- Formula: C_{15}H_{14}Cl_{2}NO_{5}
- Molar mass: 359.18 g·mol^{−1}
- 3D model (JSmol): Interactive image
- SMILES: F[C@@]2(C(=O)O)[C@H]3[C@@](C(=O)O)(N)[C@H](OCc1ccc(Cl)c(Cl)c1)C[C@@H]23
- InChI: InChI=1S/C15H14Cl2FNO5/c16-8-2-1-6(3-9(8)17)5-24-10-4-7-11(14(7,18)12(20)21)15(10,19)13(22)23/h1-3,7,10-11H,4-5,19H2,(H,20,21)(H,22,23)/t7-,10-,11+,14-,15+/m1/s1; Key:LFAGGDAZZKUVKO-JAGWWQSPSA-N

MGS-0039 is a drug that is used in neuroscientific research, which acts as a potent and selective antagonist for group II of the metabotropic glutamate receptors (mGluR_{2/3}). It produces antidepressant and anxiolytic effects in animal studies, and has been shown to boost release of dopamine and serotonin in specific brain areas. Research has suggested this may occur through a similar mechanism as that suggested for the similarly glutamatergic drug ketamine.
