= DCG-IV =

Chemical compound

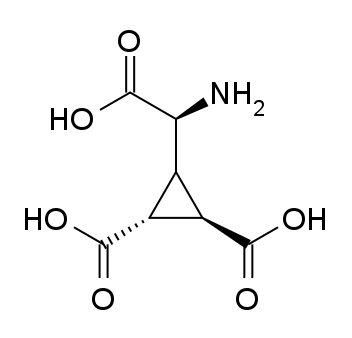

Identifiers
- IUPAC name: (1R,2R)-3-[(1S)-1-amino-2-hydroxy-2-oxoethyl]cyclopropane-1,2-dicarboxylic acid
- CAS Number: 147782-19-2
- PubChem CID: 5310979
- ChemSpider: 4470521
- CompTox Dashboard (EPA): DTXSID00933208
- ECHA InfoCard: 100.161.971

Chemical and physical data
- Formula: C_{7}H_{9}NO_{6}
- Molar mass: 203.150 g·mol^{−1}
- 3D model (JSmol): Interactive image
- SMILES: [C@@H]1([C@@H](C1[C@@H](C(=O)O)N)C(=O)O)C(=O)O
- InChI: InChI=1S/C7H9NO6/c8-4(7(13)14)1-2(5(9)10)3(1)6(11)12/h1-4H,8H2,(H,9,10)(H,11,12)(H,13,14)/t2-,3-,4+/m1/s1; Key:MATPZHBYOVDBLI-JJYYJPOSSA-N

DCG-IV is a research drug which acts as a group-selective agonist for the group II metabotropic glutamate receptors (mGluR_{2}_{/}_{3}). It has potent neuroprotective and anticonvulsant effects in animal studies, as well as showing anti-Parkinsonian effects, but also impairs the formation of memories.
