= GRIN3B =

Protein-coding gene in the species Homo sapiens

Identifiers
- Aliases: GRIN3B, GluN3B, NR3B, glutamate ionotropic receptor NMDA type subunit 3B
- External IDs: OMIM: 606651; MGI: 2150393; GeneCards: GRIN3B

Gene location (Human)
Chr.	Chromosome 19 (human)
Band	19p13.3	Start	1,000,419 bp
Band	19p13.3	End	1,009,732 bp

Gene location (Mouse)
Chr.	Chromosome 10 (mouse)
Band	10|10 C1	Start	79,806,549 bp
Band	10|10 C1	End	79,813,024 bp
RNA expression pattern
Bgee	Human / Mouse (ortholog); Top expressed in: right uterine tube; olfactory zone of nasal mucosa; testicle; bronchial epithelial cell; stromal cell of endometrium; right lung; canal of the cervix; granulocyte; left lobe of thyroid gland; right hemisphere of cerebellum / Top expressed in: lumbar subsegment of spinal cord; motor neuron; facial motor nucleus; spermatid; seminiferous tubule; ascending aorta; aortic valve; anterior horn of spinal cord; morula; embryo; More reference expression data
BioGPS	n/a
Gene ontology
Molecular function	calcium channel activity; glycine binding; ion channel activity; ionotropic glutamate receptor activity; cation channel activity; neurotransmitter binding; neurotransmitter receptor activity; extracellularly glutamate-gated ion channel activity; signaling receptor activity
Cellular component	integral component of membrane; postsynaptic membrane; membrane; plasma membrane; synapse; cell junction; soma; NMDA selective glutamate receptor complex; postsynapse
Biological process	regulation of calcium ion transport; ion transport; ionotropic glutamate receptor signaling pathway; protein insertion into membrane; calcium ion transmembrane transport; cation transmembrane transport; ion transmembrane transport; excitatory postsynaptic potential; signal transduction
Sources:Amigo / QuickGO
Orthologs
Databases	NCBI: entry; OMA: entry
Species	Human	Mouse
Entrez	116444	170483
Ensembl	ENSG00000116032	ENSMUSG00000035745
UniProt	O60391; Q5F0I5	Q91ZU9
RefSeq (mRNA)	NM_138690	NM_130455
RefSeq (protein)	NP_619635; NP_619635.1	NP_569722
Location (UCSC)	Chr 19: 1 – 1.01 Mb	Chr 10: 79.81 – 79.81 Mb
PubMed search
- Wikidata
View/Edit Human	View/Edit Mouse

Glutamate [NMDA] receptor subunit 3B is a protein that in humans is encoded by the GRIN3B gene.

== See also ==
- NMDA receptor
