= Biphenylindanone A =

Chemical compound

Clinical data
- ATC code: none

Identifiers
- IUPAC name: 3’-(((2-cyclopentyl-6,7-dimethyl-1-oxo-2,3-dihydro- 1H-inden-5-yl)oxy)methyl)biphenyl-4-carboxylic acid
- CAS Number: 866823-73-6
- PubChem CID: 9868580
- IUPHAR/BPS: 3954
- ChemSpider: 8044271
- ChEMBL: ChEMBL593013
- CompTox Dashboard (EPA): DTXSID90432098

Chemical and physical data
- Formula: C_{30}H_{30}O_{4}
- Molar mass: 454.566 g·mol^{−1}
- 3D model (JSmol): Interactive image
- SMILES: c3cc(C(O)=O)ccc3-c(ccc4)cc4COc(c1C)cc(c(C2=O)c1C)CC2C5CCCC5
- InChI: InChI=1S/C30H30O4/c1-18-19(2)28-25(15-26(29(28)31)22-7-3-4-8-22)16-27(18)34-17-20-6-5-9-24(14-20)21-10-12-23(13-11-21)30(32)33/h5-6,9-14,16,22,26H,3-4,7-8,15,17H2,1-2H3,(H,32,33); Key:KMKBEESNZAPKMP-UHFFFAOYSA-N

Biphenylindanone A (BINA, LS-193,571) is a research agent which acts as a potent and selective positive allosteric modulator for the group II metabotropic glutamate receptor subtype mGluR2.

In animal studies it showed anxiolytic and antipsychotic effects, and blocked the effects produced by the hallucinogenic drug DOB. BINA and other selective mGluR2 positive modulators have therefore been suggested as a novel class of drugs for the treatment of schizophrenia which may have superior properties to traditional antipsychotic drugs.

BINA decreases cocaine self-administration in rats, with no effect on food self-administration, and is in regard to this discrimination superior to the mGluR_{2/3} agonist LY-379,268.
