= Metabotropic glutamate receptor 1 =

Mammalian protein found in humans

GRM1
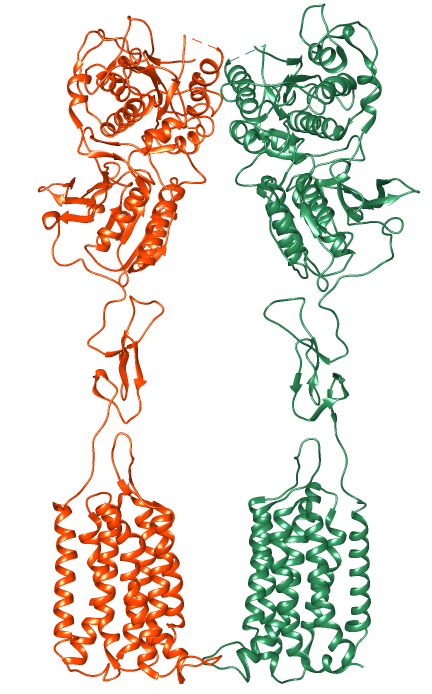

Identifiers
- Aliases: GRM1, GPRC1A, MGLU1, MGLUR1, PPP1R85, SCAR13, glutamate metabotropic receptor 1, SCA44
- External IDs: OMIM: 604473; MGI: 1351338; GeneCards: GRM1
Available structures
| PDB | Ortholog search: PDBe RCSB |
| PDB | List of PDB id codes 3KS9, 4OR2 |

Gene location (Human)
| Chr. | Chromosome 6 (human) |
| Band | 6q24.3 | Start | 146,027,646 bp |
| Band | 6q24.3 | End | 146,437,601 bp |

Gene location (Mouse)
| Chr. | Chromosome 10 (mouse) |
| Band | 10|10 A1 | Start | 10,561,803 bp |
| Band | 10|10 A1 | End | 10,958,100 bp |
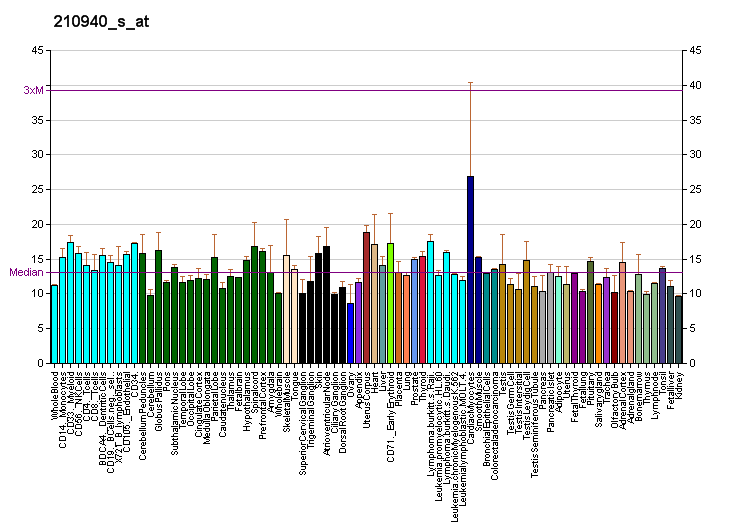

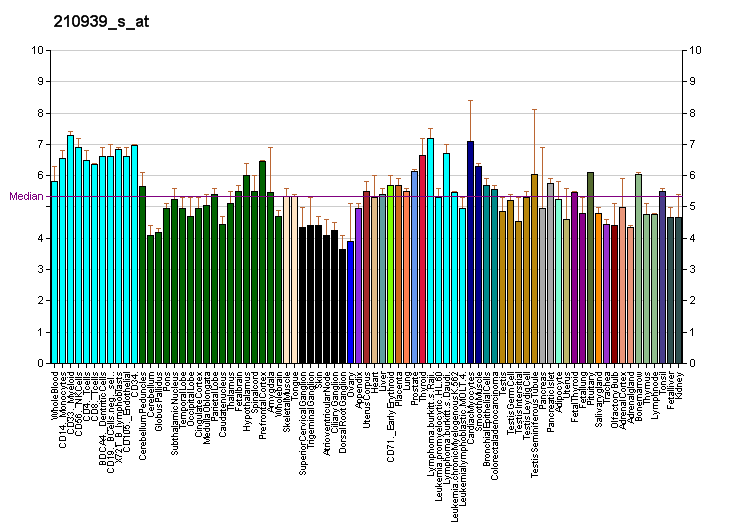

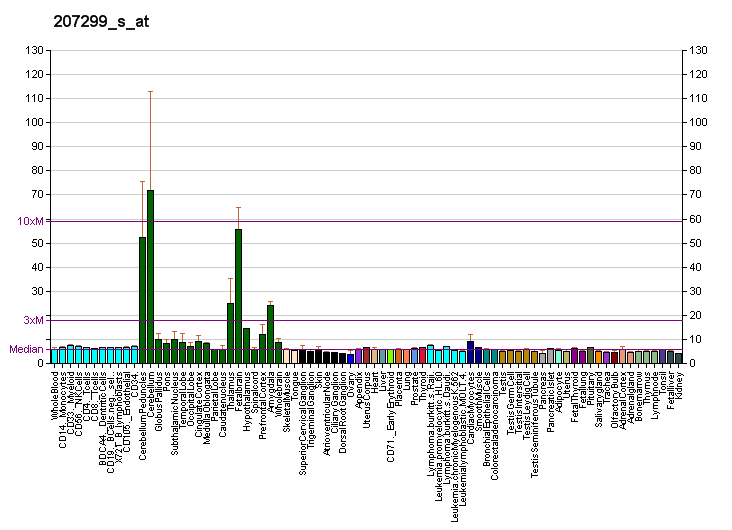
RNA expression pattern
| Bgee | Human / Mouse (ortholog); Top expressed in: lateral nuclear group of thalamus; cerebellar vermis; middle temporal gyrus; endothelial cell; Brodmann area 23; cerebellar hemisphere; paraflocculus of cerebellum; right hemisphere of cerebellum; pons; optic nerve / Top expressed in: medial dorsal nucleus; medial geniculate nucleus; lobe of cerebellum; lateral geniculate nucleus; cerebellar vermis; deep cerebellar nuclei; mammillary body; superior colliculus; globus pallidus; lateral hypothalamus; More reference expression data |
| BioGPS | More reference expression data |
Gene ontology
| Molecular function | glutamate receptor activity; G protein-coupled receptor activity; signal transducer activity; protein binding; neurotransmitter receptor activity involved in regulation of postsynaptic cytosolic calcium ion concentration; identical protein binding; G protein-coupled neurotransmitter receptor activity involved in regulation of postsynaptic cytosolic calcium ion concentration; G protein-coupled receptor activity involved in regulation of postsynaptic membrane potential |
| Cellular component | integral component of membrane; G protein-coupled receptor dimeric complex; postsynaptic density; membrane; G protein-coupled receptor homodimeric complex; plasma membrane; integral component of plasma membrane; dendrite; neuron projection; nucleus; presynaptic membrane; Schaffer collateral - CA1 synapse; glutamatergic synapse; postsynaptic density membrane |
| Biological process | cellular response to electrical stimulus; G protein-coupled glutamate receptor signaling pathway; positive regulation of cytosolic calcium ion concentration involved in phospholipase C-activating G protein-coupled signaling pathway; regulation of MAPK cascade; regulation of sensory perception of pain; locomotory behavior; sensory perception of pain; signal transduction; chemical synaptic transmission; regulation of synaptic transmission, glutamatergic; adenylate cyclase-inhibiting G protein-coupled glutamate receptor signaling pathway; regulation of postsynaptic cytosolic calcium ion concentration; G protein-coupled receptor signaling pathway; regulation of postsynaptic membrane potential |
Sources:Amigo / QuickGO
Orthologs
| Databases | NCBI: entry; OMA: entry |
| Species | Human | Mouse |
| Entrez | 2911 | 14816 |
| Ensembl | ENSG00000152822 | ENSMUSG00000019828 |
| UniProt | Q13255 | P97772 |
| RefSeq (mRNA) | NM_000838; NM_001114329; NM_001278064; NM_001278065; NM_001278066 NM_001278067 | NM_001114333; NM_016976 |
| RefSeq (protein) | NP_001264993; NP_001264994; NP_001264995; NP_001264996 | NP_001107805; NP_058672 |
| Location (UCSC) | Chr 6: 146.03 – 146.44 Mb | Chr 10: 10.56 – 10.96 Mb |
| PubMed search |
- Wikidata
| View/Edit Human | View/Edit Mouse |

The glutamate receptor, metabotropic 1, also known as GRM1, is a human gene which encodes the metabotropic glutamate receptor 1 (mGluR1) protein.

== Function ==
L-Glutamate is the major excitatory neurotransmitter in the central nervous system and activates both ionotropic and metabotropic glutamate receptors. Glutamatergic neurotransmission is involved in most aspects of normal brain function and can be perturbed in many neuropathologic conditions. The metabotropic glutamate receptors are a family of G protein-coupled receptors, that have been divided into 3 groups on the basis of sequence homology, putative signal transduction mechanisms, and pharmacologic properties. Group I, which includes GRM1 alongside GRM5, have been shown to activate phospholipase C. Group II includes GRM2 and GRM3 while Group III includes GRM4, GRM6, GRM7 and GRM8. Group II and III receptors are linked to the inhibition of the cyclic AMP cascade but differ in their agonist selectivities. Alternative splice variants of the GRM1 gene have been described but their full-length nature has not been determined.

A possible connection has been suggested between mGluRs and neuromodulators, as mGluR1 antagonists block adrenergic receptor activation in neurons.

== Studies with knockout mice ==
Mice lacking functional glutamate receptor 1 were reported in 1994. By homologous recombination mediated gene targeting those mice became deficient in mGlu receptor 1 protein. The mice did not show any basic anatomical changes in the brain but had impaired cerebellar long-term depression and hippocampal long-term potentiation. In addition they had impaired motor functions, characterized by impaired balance. In the Morris watermaze test, an assay for learning abilities, those mice needed significantly more time to successfully complete the task.

== Clinical significance ==
Mutations in the GRM1 gene may contribute to melanoma susceptibility. Antibodies against mGluR1 receptors cause cerebellar ataxia and impair long-term depression (LTDpathies) in the cerebellum.

== Ligands ==
In addition to the orthosteric site (the site where the endogenous ligand glutamate binds) at least two distinct allosteric binding sites exist on the mGluR1. A respectable number of potent and specific allosteric ligands – predominantly antagonists/inhibitors – has been developed in recent years, although no orthosteric subtype-selective ligands have yet been discovered (2008).

- JNJ-16259685: highly potent, selective non-competitive antagonist
- R-214,127 and [^{3}H]-analog: high-affinity, selective allosteric inhibitor
- YM-202,074: high-affinity, selective allosteric antagonist
- YM-230,888: high-affinity, selective allosteric antagonist
- YM-298,198 and [^{3}H]-analog: selective non-competitive antagonist
- FTIDC: highly potent and selective allosteric antagonist/inverse agonist
- A-841,720: potent non-competitive antagonist; minor hmGluR5 binding
- VU-71: potentiator
- RO0711401 - mGluR1 PAM
- Fluorinated 9H-xanthene-9-carboxylic acid oxazol-2-yl-amides: orally available PAMs
- Cyclothiazide: selective non-competitive antagonist of the mGluR1 (also AMPA potentiator and minor mGluR5 potentiator but not antagonist)
- Riluzole : selective non-competitive antagonist
- Theanine : possible indirect inhibitor

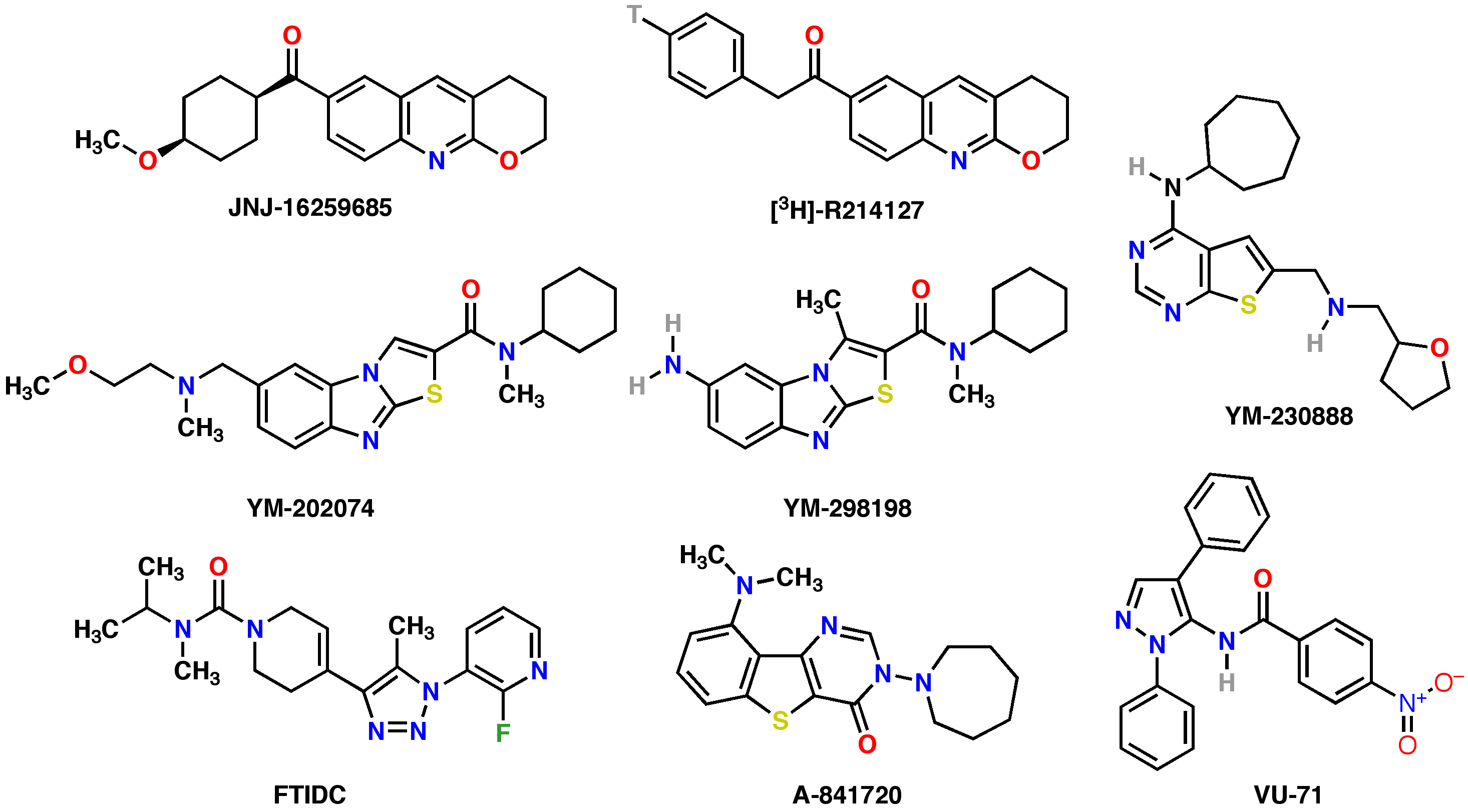
Chemical structures of mGluR1 selective ligands.

== See also ==
- Metabotropic glutamate receptor
