= Metabotropic receptor =

Type of membrane receptor that acts through a second messenger

A metabotropic receptor, also referred to by the broader term G-protein-coupled receptor, is a type of membrane receptor that initiates a number of metabolic steps to modulate cell activity. The nervous system utilizes two types of receptors: metabotropic and ionotropic receptors. While ionotropic receptors form an ion channel pore, metabotropic receptors are indirectly linked with ion channels through signal transduction mechanisms, such as G proteins. These two types of receptors, along with their number and activity level, form the basis of the sympathetic and parasympathetic nervous systems and play key roles in regulating rates of resting energy expenditure (REE), resting heart rate, heart rate variability, and global myocardial oxygen consumption.

Both receptor types are activated by specific chemical ligands. When an ionotropic receptor is activated, it opens a channel that allows ions such as Na^{+}, K^{+}, or Cl^{−} to flow. In contrast, when a metabotropic receptor is activated, a series of intracellular events are triggered that can also result in ion channels opening or other intracellular events, but involve a range of second messenger chemicals.

== Mechanism ==
Chemical messengers bind to metabotropic receptors to initiate a diversity of effects caused by biochemical signaling cascades. G protein-coupled receptors are all metabotropic receptors. When a ligand binds to a G protein-coupled receptor, a guanine nucleotide-binding protein, or G protein, activates a second messenger cascade which can alter gene transcription, regulate other proteins in the cell, release intracellular Ca^{2+}, or directly affect ion channels on the membrane. These receptors can remain open from seconds to minutes and are associated with long-lasting effects, such as modifying synaptic strength and modulating short- and long-term synaptic plasticity.

Metabotropic receptors have a diversity of ligands, including but not limited to: small molecule transmitters, monoamines, peptides, hormones, and even gases. In comparison to fast-acting neurotransmitters, these ligands are not taken up again or degraded quickly. They can also enter the circulatory system to globalize a signal. Most metabotropic ligands have unique receptors. Some examples include: metabotropic glutamate receptors, muscarinic acetylcholine receptors, GABA_{B} receptors.

== Structure ==
The G protein-coupled receptors have seven hydrophobic transmembrane domains. Most of them are monomeric proteins, although GABA_{B} receptors require heterodimerization to function properly. The protein's N terminus is located on the extracellular side of the membrane and its C terminus is on the intracellular side.

The 7 transmembrane spanning domains, with an external amino terminus, are often claimed as being alpha helix shaped, and the polypeptide chain is said to be composed of around 450–550 amino acids.
