= Metabotropic glutamate receptor 6 =

Mammalian protein found in humans

GRM6

Identifiers
- Aliases: GRM6, CSNB1B, GPRC1F, MGLUR6, mGlu6, glutamate metabotropic receptor 6
- External IDs: OMIM: 604096; MGI: 1351343; GeneCards: GRM6

Gene location (Human)
Chr.	Chromosome 5 (human)
Band	5q35.3	Start	178,977,587 bp
Band	5q35.3	End	178,996,206 bp

Gene location (Mouse)
Chr.	Chromosome 11 (mouse)
Band	11|11 B1.3	Start	50,741,512 bp
Band	11|11 B1.3	End	50,757,035 bp
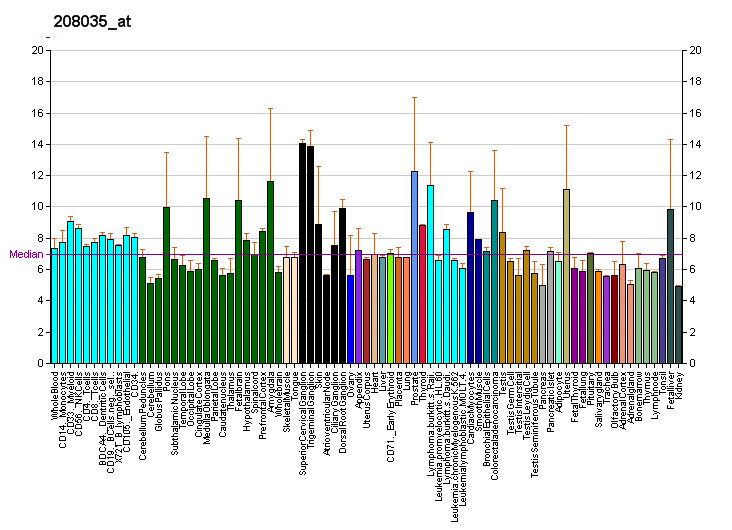
RNA expression pattern
Bgee	Human / Mouse (ortholog); Top expressed in: testicle; pancreatic ductal cell; tibialis anterior muscle; cerebellar hemisphere; ganglionic eminence; right hemisphere of cerebellum; anterior pituitary; deltoid muscle; hypothalamus; Ventricular system of neuraxis / Top expressed in: neural layer of retina; embryo; epiblast; spleen; thymus; bone marrow; lens; islet of Langerhans; More reference expression data
BioGPS	More reference expression data
Gene ontology
Molecular function	glutamate receptor activity; G protein-coupled receptor activity; protein homodimerization activity; signal transducer activity; adenylate cyclase inhibiting G protein-coupled glutamate receptor activity; protein binding
Cellular component	integral component of membrane; Golgi apparatus; cell projection; endoplasmic reticulum membrane; membrane; Golgi membrane; plasma membrane; integral component of plasma membrane; dendrite; endoplasmic reticulum; presynaptic membrane; new growing cell tip
Biological process	G protein-coupled glutamate receptor signaling pathway; detection of visible light; locomotory behavior; response to stimulus; sensory perception of light stimulus; detection of light stimulus involved in visual perception; positive regulation of calcium ion import; retina development in camera-type eye; signal transduction; visual perception; chemical synaptic transmission; regulation of synaptic transmission, glutamatergic; adenylate cyclase-inhibiting G protein-coupled glutamate receptor signaling pathway; G protein-coupled receptor signaling pathway
Sources:Amigo / QuickGO
Orthologs
Databases	NCBI: entry; OMA: entry
Species	Human	Mouse
Entrez	2916	108072
Ensembl	ENSG00000113262	ENSMUSG00000000617
UniProt	O15303	Q5NCH9
RefSeq (mRNA)	NM_000843	NM_173372
RefSeq (protein)	NP_000834	NP_775548
Location (UCSC)	Chr 5: 178.98 – 179 Mb	Chr 11: 50.74 – 50.76 Mb
PubMed search
- Wikidata
View/Edit Human	View/Edit Mouse

Glutamate receptor, metabotropic 6, also known as GRM6 or mGluR6, is a protein which in humans is encoded by the GRM6 gene.

== Function ==
L-glutamate is the major excitatory neurotransmitter in the central nervous system and activates both ionotropic and metabotropic glutamate receptors. Glutamatergic neurotransmission is involved in most aspects of normal brain function and can be perturbed in many neuropathologic conditions. The metabotropic glutamate receptors are a family of G protein-coupled receptors, that have been divided into 3 groups on the basis of sequence homology, putative signal transduction mechanisms, and pharmacologic properties. Group I includes GRM1 and GRM5 and these receptors have been shown to activate phospholipase C. Group II includes GRM2 and GRM3, while Group III includes GRM4, GRM6, GRM7 and GRM8. Group II and III receptors are linked to the inhibition of the cyclic AMP cascade but differ in their agonist selectivities.

mGluR6 is specifically expressed in the retina, in a subtype of bipolar cells that depolarize in response to light, known as ON bipolar cells. These cells form synapses with photoreceptor cells, and detect the neurotransmitter glutamate via a GPCR signal transduction cascade. The glutamate receptor mGluR6 is located post-synaptically at the tips of the bipolar cell dendrites, and is responsible for initiating a signaling cascade that ultimately controls gating of the TRPM1 channel. In human patients, mutations in the GRM6 gene are associated with congenital stationary night blindness.

== Ligands ==
Compounds L-AP4 and 1-benzyl-APDC act as selective agonists of group III mGluRs and mGlu_{6} receptors, respectively.

A small library of photoswitchable agonists-positive allosteric modulators of mGlu_{6} receptors ('prosthe6') has been developed. Their light-dependent (photopharmacological) activity in ON bipolar cells mimics the physiological signaling of the retina and allows restoring vision in animal models of retinal degeneration. In particular, they restore visually guided behavior in mouse models of macular degeneration and retinitis pigmentosa, and restore visual acuity in blinded zebrafish larvae.

== See also ==
- Metabotropic glutamate receptor
