= Dihydroxyphenylglycine =

Names
- IUPAC name (S)-2-amino-2-(3,5-dihydroxyphenyl)acetic acid
- Other names 3,5-dihydroxyphenylglycine, DHPG, S-DHPG

Identifiers
CAS Number	162870-29-3
3D model (JSmol)	Interactive image
ChemSpider	391750
MeSH	3,5-dihydroxyphenylglycine
PubChem CID	443586
UNII	CF5G2G268A
CompTox Dashboard (EPA)	DTXSID901311536
- InChI: InChI=1S/C8H9NO4/c10-6-3-1-2-5(8(6)13)9-4-7(11)12/h1-3,9-10,13H,4H2,(H,11,12) Key: RCPPFACRJDEDFY-UHFFFAOYSA-N; InChI=1/C8H9NO4/c10-6-3-1-2-5(8(6)13)9-4-7(11)12/h1-3,9-10,13H,4H2,(H,11,12) Key: RCPPFACRJDEDFY-UHFFFAOYAU
- SMILES: C1=C(O)C=C(O)C=C1[C@@H](C(=O)O)N

Properties
Chemical formula	C_{8}H_{9}NO_{4}
Molar mass	183.05 g mol^{−1}
- Except where otherwise noted, data are given for materials in their standard state (at 25 °C [77 °F], 100 kPa). verify (what is ?) Infobox references

(S)-3,5-Dihydroxyphenylglycine or DHPG is a potent agonist of group I metabotropic glutamate receptors (mGluRs) mGluR1 and mGluR5.

DHPG was the first agonist shown to be selective for group I mGluRs. Agonist activity is found in only the (S)-isomer, and (S)-DHPG may be a partial agonist of group I mGluRs.

(S)-DHPG has been investigated for therapeutic effects in the treatment of neuronal injury (such as those associated with ischemia or hypoxia), cognitive enhancement, and Alzheimer's disease.

3,5-Dihydroxyphenylglycine can be isolated from the latex of Euphorbia helioscopia.

DHGP is also found in vancomycin and related glycopeptides. Although the (S) stereoisomer is synthesized by the DpgA-D enzymes, it is the (R) stereoisomer that is used in vancomycin and other related compounds. DHPG is enzymatically derived from the polyketide synthase pathway.

== Biosynthesis ==
When synthesized in bacteria, DHPG requires 5 enzymes, DpgA-D and 4-hydroxyphenylglycine transferase (Pgat), in order to be synthesized. DpgA is a type III polyketide synthase and initiates the synthesis by condensing acetyl-CoA with three molecules of malonyl-CoA. The tetra-carbonyl compound then cyclizes to form a C8 intermediate. DpgB/D then dehydrates the intermediate using enolate chemistry to promote the loss of water. DpgB/D isomerizes the product to aromatize the ring.

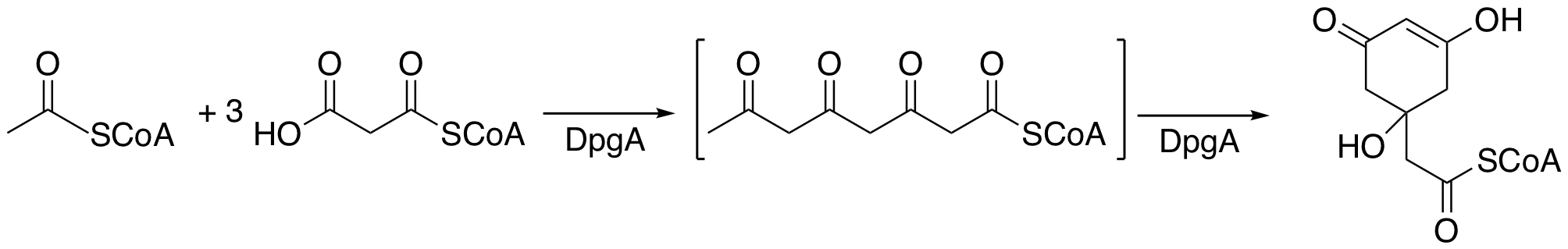
First steps of DHPG involving enzyme DpgA. DpgA condenses acetyl-CoA and malonyl-CoA into a polyketide and then cyclizes the polyketide into a C8 intermediate.

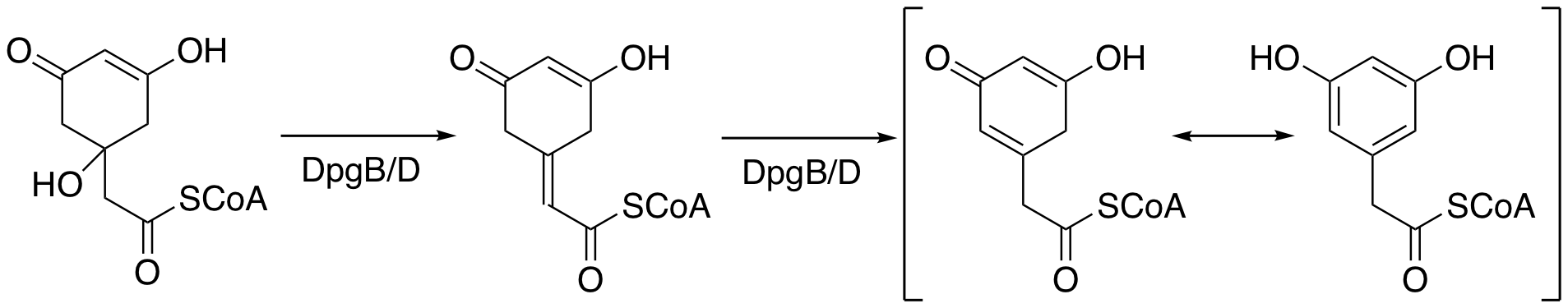
DHPG synthesis involving enzymes DpgB and DpgD. Aromatization of the C8 intermediate through dehydration and then alkene isomerization.

DpgC oxidizes the aromatic intermediate at the benzylic carbon using oxygen to an alpha-keto compound. DpgC performs this oxidation in absence of any iron, heme, flavin, or pterin cofactors. Chen et al suggest the following reaction mechanism to explain the reactivity of DpgC. This mechanism is supported by findings reported in Widboom et al in 2007. Finally, the molecule is transaminated by 4-hydroxyphenylglycine transferase using tyrosine to become DHPG.

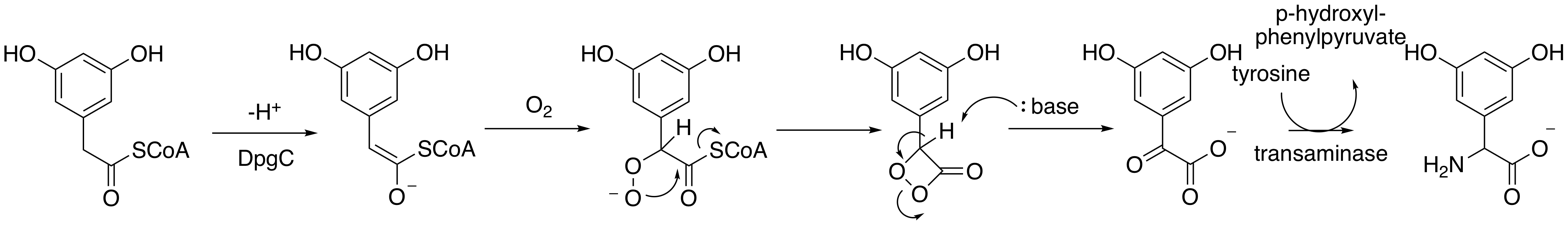
Final steps of the biosynthesis of DHPG. The mechanism of DpgC on the intermediate substrate has been proposed by Chen et al. is included.

4-Hydroxyphenylglycine transferase synthesizes the (S) stereoisomer of DHPG, however, an epimerase switches the stereocenter to the (R) configuration after DHPG is incorporated into the vancomycin non-ribosomal polypeptide.
