= EGLU =

Chemical compound

Identifiers
- IUPAC name: (2S)-2-Amino-2-ethylpentanedioic acid
- CAS Number: 170984-72-2
- PubChem CID: 5311079
- IUPHAR/BPS: 1400
- ChemSpider: 4470613
- CompTox Dashboard (EPA): DTXSID50415504

Chemical and physical data
- Formula: C_{7}H_{13}NO_{4}
- Molar mass: 175.184 g·mol^{−1}
- 3D model (JSmol): Interactive image
- SMILES: O=C(O)CC[C@](N)(C(=O)O)CC
- InChI: InChI=1S/C7H13NO4/c1-2-7(8,6(11)12)4-3-5(9)10/h2-4,8H2,1H3,(H,9,10)(H,11,12)/t7-/m0/s1; Key:QFYBYZLHPIALCZ-ZETCQYMHSA-N

EGLU ((2S)-α-ethylglutamic acid ) is a drug that is used in neuroscience research. It was one of the first compounds found that acts as a selective antagonist for the group II metabotropic glutamate receptors (mGluR_{2/3}), and so has been useful in the characterization and study of this receptor subfamily.
