= Metabotropic glutamate receptor 2 =

Mammalian protein found in humans

GRM2
Available structures
| PDB | Ortholog search: PDBe RCSB |
| PDB | List of PDB id codes 4XAQ, 4XAS, 5CNI, 5CNJ |

Identifiers
- Aliases: GRM2, GPRC1B, MGLUR2, mGlu2, glutamate metabotropic receptor 2, mGluR2, GLUR2
- External IDs: OMIM: 604099; MGI: 1351339; HomoloGene: 20229; GeneCards: GRM2; OMA:GRM2 - orthologs

Gene location (Human)
| Chr. | Chromosome 3 (human) |
| Band | 3p21.2 | Start | 51,707,068 bp |
| Band | 3p21.2 | End | 51,718,613 bp |

Gene location (Mouse)
| Chr. | Chromosome 9 (mouse) |
| Band | 9|9 F1 | Start | 106,520,294 bp |
| Band | 9|9 F1 | End | 106,533,281 bp |
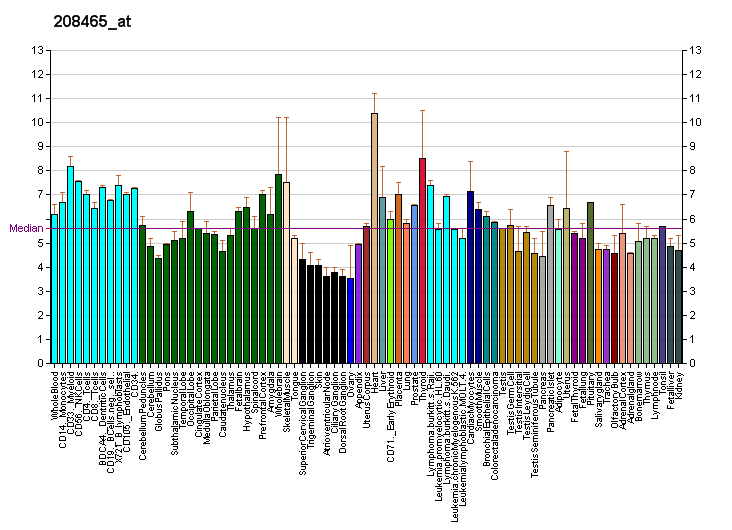
RNA expression pattern
| Bgee | Human / Mouse (ortholog); Top expressed in: vena cava; right frontal lobe; prefrontal cortex; right testis; left testis; Brodmann area 9; endothelial cell; ganglionic eminence; pons; gonad / Top expressed in: zygote; secondary oocyte; primary oocyte; dentate gyrus of hippocampal formation granule cell; primary visual cortex; mammillary body; prefrontal cortex; olfactory bulb; hippocampus proper; superior frontal gyrus; More reference expression data |
| BioGPS | More reference expression data |
Gene ontology
| Molecular function | glutamate receptor activity; G protein-coupled receptor activity; group II metabotropic glutamate receptor activity; calcium channel regulator activity; signal transducer activity; protein binding |
| Cellular component | integral component of membrane; cell projection; membrane; plasma membrane; synapse; integral component of plasma membrane; intracellular anatomical structure; axon; cell junction; dendrite; neuron projection; presynaptic membrane; integral component of postsynaptic membrane |
| Biological process | negative regulation of adenylate cyclase activity; glutamate secretion; signal transduction; chemical synaptic transmission; regulation of synaptic transmission, glutamatergic; adenylate cyclase-inhibiting G protein-coupled glutamate receptor signaling pathway; G protein-coupled glutamate receptor signaling pathway; G protein-coupled receptor signaling pathway; glutamate homeostasis |
Sources:Amigo / QuickGO
Orthologs
| Species | Human | Mouse |
| Entrez | 2912 | 108068 |
| Ensembl | ENSG00000164082 | ENSMUSG00000023192 |
| UniProt | Q14416 | Q14BI2 |
| RefSeq (mRNA) | NM_000839; NM_001349116; NM_001349117 | NM_001160353 |
| RefSeq (protein) | NP_000830; NP_001336045; NP_001336046 | NP_001153825 |
| Location (UCSC) | Chr 3: 51.71 – 51.72 Mb | Chr 9: 106.52 – 106.53 Mb |
| PubMed search |
- Wikidata
| View/Edit Human | View/Edit Mouse |

Metabotropic glutamate receptor 2 (mGluR2) is a protein that, in humans, is encoded by the GRM2 gene. mGluR2 is a G protein-coupled receptor (GPCR) that couples with the Gi alpha subunit. The receptor functions as an autoreceptor for glutamate, that upon activation, inhibits the emptying of vesicular contents at the presynaptic terminal of glutamatergic neurons.

== Structure ==
In humans, mGluR2 is encoded by the GRM2 gene on chromosome 3. At least three protein-coding isoforms are predicted based on genomic information, as well as numerous non-coding isoforms. The mGluR2 protein is a seven-pass transmembrane protein.

== Function ==
In humans, mGluR2 is only expressed in the brain, and not in any other tissue. In the brain, mGluR2 is expressed in neurons as well as astrocytes. Subcellularly, mGluR2 is predominantly positioned at the presynaptic terminal, although it is also expressed at the postsynaptic terminal.

The metabotropic glutamate receptors are a family of G protein-coupled receptors, that have been divided into 3 groups on the basis of sequence homology, putative signal transduction mechanisms, and pharmacologic properties: Group I includes GRM1 and GRM5 and these receptors have been shown to activate phospholipase C. Group II includes mGluR2 (this receptor) and GRM3 while Group III includes GRM4, GRM6, GRM7 and GRM8. Group II and III receptors are linked to the inhibition of the cyclic AMP cascade but differ in their agonist selectivities.

== Protein–protein interactions ==
mGluR2 is able to form a heteromeric complex with various other different GPCRs. One example is with isoform mGluR4. The mGluR2-mGluR4 heteromer exhibits a pharmacological profile distinct from the parent receptor monomers. Another example is with serotonin receptor 2A (5HT2A); see below.

== Pharmacology ==
The development of subtype-2-selective positive allosteric modulators (PAMs) experienced steady advance in recent years. mGluR2 potentiation is a new approach for the treatment of schizophrenia. On the other hand, antagonists and negative allosteric modulators of mGluR_{2/3} have potential as antidepressant drugs.

=== Agonists ===
- Compound 1d (see reference)
- LY-2812223

=== PAMs ===
Highly selective mGluR2 PAM (2010), analog of BINA

- JNJ-46356479
- JNJ-40411813
- GSK-1331258
- Imidazo[1,2-a]pyridines
- 3-Aryl-5-phenoxymethyl-1,3-oxazolidin-2-ones
- 3-(Imidazolyl methyl)-3-aza-bicyclo[3.1.0]hexan-6-yl)methyl ethers: potent, orally stable
- BINA: potent; modest ago-allosteric modulator; robust in-vivo activity.
- LY-487,379: devoid of orthosteric activity; along with related 3-pyridylmethylsulfonamides the first subtype-2-selective potentiator published (2003).

=== Antagonists ===
- LY-341,495
- MGS-0039
- EGLU

=== NAMs ===
- 7,8-dichloro-4-[3-(2-methylpyridin-4-yl)phenyl]-1,3-dihydro-1,5-benzodiazepin-2-one and related compounds.
- MNI-137 - 8-bromo-4-(2-cyanopyridin-4-yl)-1H-benzo[b][1,4]diazepin-2(3H)-one
- RO4491533 - 4-[3-(2,6-dimethylpyridin-4-yl)phenyl]-7-methyl-8-trifluoromethyl-1,3-dihydrobenzo[b][1,4]diazepin-2-one

== Role in hallucinogenesis ==
Many psychedelic drugs (e.g. LSD-25) produce their effects by binding to the oligomerized complexes of the 5HT2A and mGlu2 receptors. Lisuride acts preferentially or exclusively on the non-heteromerized 5HT2A receptors, which are not capable of inducing psychedelic effects. Due to this, lisuride is capable of reducing the hallucinogenic effects of these drugs through competitive antagonistic activity (producing the effect of a silent antagonist in the presence of these drugs).

Strong agonists for either subunit of the 5HT2A-mGlu2R heterocomplex suppress signaling through the partner subunit and inverse agonists for either subunit potentiate the signaling through the partner subunit.

== Role in rabies virus infection ==
mGluR2 has been found to be a novel receptor for rabies virus. The virus has a glycoprotein on its surface which interacts with the receptor. Rabies virus can bind to mGLuR2 directly and the virus-receptor complex is internalized into the cell together. The complex is then transported into early and late endosomes. Rabies virus enters the cells by clathrin-independent endocytosis which could suggest that mGLuR2 also uses this pathway. It is still to be clarified whether the Rabies virus glycoprotein can act as a PAM or NAM and in such a way affect the function of the receptor.

== See also ==
- Metabotropic glutamate receptor
