= Metabotropic glutamate receptor =

Type of glutamate receptor

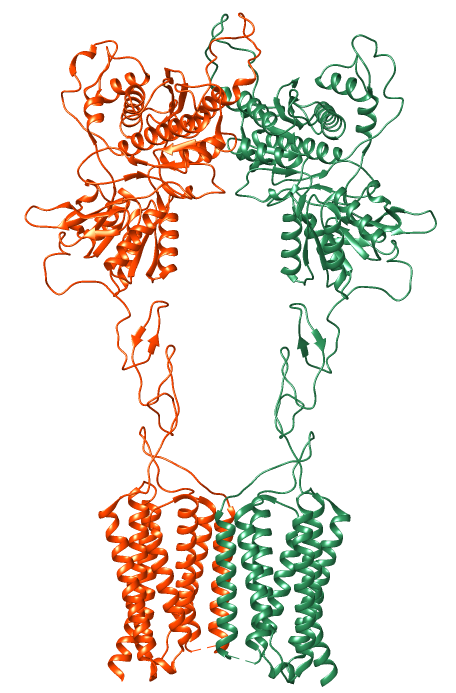
Metabotropic glutamate receptor dimer (Type 2) in ribbon representation

L-Glutamic acid

The metabotropic glutamate receptors, or mGluRs, are a type of glutamate receptor that are active through an indirect metabotropic process. They are members of the group C family of G-protein-coupled receptors, or GPCRs. Like all glutamate receptors, mGluRs bind with glutamate, an amino acid that functions as an excitatory neurotransmitter.

== Function and structure ==
The mGluRs perform a variety of functions in the central and peripheral nervous systems: For example, they are involved in learning, memory, anxiety, and the perception of pain. They are found in pre- and postsynaptic neurons in synapses of the hippocampus, cerebellum, and the cerebral cortex, as well as other parts of the brain and in peripheral tissues.

Like other metabotropic receptors, mGluRs have seven transmembrane domains that span the cell membrane. Unlike ionotropic receptors, metabotropic glutamate receptors are not ion channels. Instead, they activate biochemical cascades, leading to the modification of other proteins, such as ion channels. This can lead to changes in the synapse's excitability, for example by presynaptic inhibition of neurotransmission, or modulation and even induction of postsynaptic responses.

A dimeric organization of mGluRs is required for signaling induced by agonists. In 2026, cryo-EM structures of endogenous receptors were reported. The complexes isolated from brain exhibit significant differences from structures reported previously using recombinant systems.

== Classification ==
Eight different types of mGluRs, labeled mGluR_{1} to mGluR_{8} (GRM1 to GRM8), are divided into groups I, II, and III. Receptor types are grouped based on receptor structure and physiological activity. The mGluRs are further divided into subtypes, such as mGluR_{7a} and mGluR_{7b}.

=== Overview ===
Overview of glutamate receptors
Family	Receptors	Gene	Mechanism	Function	Agonists & Activators	Antagonists	Synapse site
Group I	mGluR_{1}	GRM1	G_{q}, ↑Na^{+}, ↑K^{+}, ↓glutamate	Increase NMDA receptor activity and risk of excitotoxicity	3,5-dihydroxyphenylglycine	YM 298 198; MTEP; MPEP; Mavoglurant; Lithium	mainly postsynaptic
Group I	mGluR_{5}	GRM5	G_{q}, ↑Na^{+}, ↑K^{+}, ↓glutamate	Increase NMDA receptor activity and risk of excitotoxicity	3,5-dihydroxyphenylglycine	YM 298 198; MTEP; MPEP; Mavoglurant; Lithium	mainly postsynaptic
Group II	mGluR_{2}	GRM2	G_{i}/G_{0}	Decrease NMDA receptor activity and risk of excitotoxicity	eglumegad; Biphenylindanone A; DCG-IV	APICA; EGLU; LY-341,495	mainly presynaptic
Group II	mGluR_{3}	GRM3	G_{i}/G_{0}	Decrease NMDA receptor activity and risk of excitotoxicity	eglumegad; Biphenylindanone A; DCG-IV	APICA; EGLU; LY-341,495	mainly presynaptic
Group III	mGluR_{4}	GRM4	G_{i}/G_{0}	Decrease NMDA receptor activity and risk of excitotoxicity	L-AP4		mainly presynaptic
Group III	mGluR_{6}	GRM6	G_{i}/G_{0}	Decrease NMDA receptor activity and risk of excitotoxicity	L-AP4		mainly presynaptic
Group III	mGluR_{7}	GRM7	G_{i}/G_{0}	Decrease NMDA receptor activity and risk of excitotoxicity	L-AP4		mainly presynaptic
Group III	mGluR_{8}	GRM8	G_{i}/G_{0}	Decrease NMDA receptor activity and risk of excitotoxicity	L-AP4		mainly presynaptic

=== Group I ===
Quisqualic acid

The mGluRs in group I, including mGluR_{1} and mGluR_{5}, are stimulated most strongly by the excitatory amino acid analog L-quisqualic acid. Stimulating the receptors causes the associated enzyme phospholipase C to hydrolyze phosphoinositide phospholipids in the cell's plasma membrane. This leads to the formation of inositol 1,4,5-trisphosphate (IP3) and diacyl glycerol. Due to its hydrophilic character, IP3 can travel to the endoplasmic reticulum, where it induces, via fixation on its receptor, the opening of calcium channels increasing in this way the cytosolic calcium concentrations. The lipophilic diacylglycerol remains in the membrane, acting as a cofactor for the activation of protein kinase C.

These receptors are also associated with Na^{+} and K^{+} channels. Their action can be excitatory, increasing conductance, causing more glutamate to be released from the presynaptic cell, but they also increase inhibitory postsynaptic potentials, or IPSPs. They can also inhibit glutamate release and can modulate voltage-dependent calcium channels.

Group I mGluRs, but not other groups, are activated by 3,5-dihydroxyphenylglycine (DHPG), a fact that is useful to experimenters because it allows them to isolate and identify them.

=== Group II and Group III ===
The receptors in group II, including mGluRs 2 and 3, and group III, including mGluRs 4, 6, 7, and 8, (with some exceptions) prevent the formation of cyclic adenosine monophosphate, or cAMP, by activating a G protein that inhibits the enzyme adenylyl cyclase, which forms cAMP from ATP. These receptors are involved in presynaptic inhibition, and do not appear to affect postsynaptic membrane potential by themselves. Receptors in groups II and III reduce the activity of postsynaptic potentials, both excitatory and inhibitory, in the cortex.

The chemicals 2-(2,3-dicarboxycyclopropyl)glycine (DCG-IV) and eglumegad activate only group II mGluRs, while 2-amino-4-phosphonobutyrate (L-AP4) activates only group III mGluRs. Several subtype-selective positive allosteric modulators that activate only the mGlu2 subtype, such as Biphenylindanone A, have also now been developed.

LY-341,495 and MGS-0039 are drugs that act as a selective antagonist blocking both of the group II metabotropic glutamate receptors, mGluR_{2} and mGluR_{3}. RO4491533 acts as a negative allosteric modulator of mGluR_{2} and mGluR_{3}.

== Localization ==
Different types of mGluRs are distributed differently in cells. For example, one study found that Group I mGluRs are located mostly on postsynaptic parts of cells, while groups II and III are mostly located on presynaptic elements, though they have been found on both pre- and postsynaptic membranes.

Also, different mGluR subtypes are found predominantly in different parts of the body. For example, mGluR_{4} is located only in the brain, in locations such as the thalamus, hypothalamus and caudate nucleus. All mGluRs except mGluR_{6} are thought to exist in the hippocampus and entorhinal cortex.

== Roles ==
It is thought that mGluRs play a role in a variety of different functions.

=== Modulation of other receptors ===
Metabotropic glutamate receptors are known to act as modulators of (affect the activity of) other receptors. For example, group I mGluRs are known to increase the activity of N-methyl-D-aspartate receptors (NMDARs), a type of ion channel-linked receptor that is central in a neurotoxic process called excitotoxicity. Proteins called PDZ proteins frequently anchor mGluRs near enough to NMDARs to modulate their activity.

It has been suggested that mGluRs may act as regulators of neurons' vulnerability to excitotoxicity (a deadly neurochemical process involving glutamate receptor overactivation) through their modulation of NMDARs, the receptor most involved in that process. Excessive amounts of N-methyl-D-aspartate (NMDA), the selective specific agonist of NMDARs, has been found to cause more damage to neurons in the presence of group I mGluR agonists. On the other hand, agonists of group II and III mGluRs reduce NMDAR activity.

Group II and III mGluRs tend to protect neurons from excitotoxicity, possibly by reducing the activity of NMDARs.

Metabotropic glutamate receptors are also thought to affect dopaminergic and adrenergic neurotransmission.

=== Role in plasticity ===
Like other glutamate receptors, mGluRs have been shown to be involved in synaptic plasticity and in neurotoxicity and neuroprotection.

They participate in long term potentiation and long term depression, and they are removed from the synaptic membrane in response to agonist binding.

=== Roles in disease ===
Since metabotropic glutamate receptors are involved in a variety of functions, abnormalities in their expression can contribute to disease. For example, studies with mutant mice have suggested that mutations in expression of mGluR_{1} may be involved in the development of certain types of cancer. In addition, manipulating mGluRs can be useful in treating some conditions. For example, clinical trial suggested that an mGlu_{2/3} agonist, LY354740, was effective in the treatment of generalized anxiety disorder. Also, some researchers have suggested that activation of mGluR_{4} could be used as a treatment for Parkinson's disease. Most recently, Group I mGluRs, have been implicated in the pathogenesis of Fragile X, a type of autism, and a number of studies are currently testing the therapeutic potential of drugs that modify these receptors. There is also growing evidence that group II metabotropic glutamate receptor agonists may play a role in the treatment of schizophrenia. Schizophrenia is associated with deficits in cortical inhibitory interneurons that release GABA and synaptic abnormalities associated with deficits in NMDA receptor function. These inhibitory deficits may impair cortical function via cortical disinhibition and asynchrony. The drug LY354740 (also known as Eglumegad, an mGlu_{2/3} agonist) was shown to attenuate physiologic and cognitive abnormalities in animal and human studies of NMDA receptor antagonist and serotonergic hallucinogen effects, supporting the subsequent clinical evidence of efficacy for an mGluR_{2/3} agonist in the treatment of schizophrenia. The same drug has been shown to interfere in the hypothalamic–pituitary–adrenal axis, with chronic oral administration of this drug leading to markedly reduced baseline cortisol levels in bonnet macaques (Macaca radiata); acute infusion of LY354740 resulted in a marked diminution of yohimbine-induced stress response in those animals. LY354740 has also been demonstrated to act on the metabotropic glutamate receptor 3 (GRM3) of human adrenocortical cells, downregulating aldosterone synthase, CYP11B1, and the production of adrenal steroids (i.e. aldosterone and cortisol).

== History ==
The first demonstration that glutamate could induce the formation of molecules belonging to a major second messenger system was in 1985, when it was shown that it could stimulate the formation of inositol phosphates. This finding allowed in 1987 to yield an explanation for oscillatory ionic glutamate responses and to provide further evidence for the existence of metabotropic glutamate receptors. In 1991 the first metabotropic glutamate receptor of the seven transmembrane domain family was cloned. More recent reports on ionotropic glutamate receptors able to couple to metabotropic transduction systems suggest that metabotropic responses of glutamate might not be limited to seven transmembrane domain metabotropic glutamate receptors.
