= L-AP4 =

Chemical compound

Clinical data
- Other names: L-2-Amino-4-phosphonobutyric acid

Identifiers
- IUPAC name: (2S)-2-Amino-4-phosphonobutanoic acid
- CAS Number: 23052-81-5
- PubChem CID: 179394
- IUPHAR/BPS: 1410
- ChemSpider: 156157
- UNII: C8M58SS68H
- CompTox Dashboard (EPA): DTXSID30945733
- ECHA InfoCard: 100.164.384

Chemical and physical data
- Formula: C_{4}H_{10}NO_{5}P
- Molar mass: 183.100 g·mol^{−1}
- 3D model (JSmol): Interactive image
- SMILES: C(CP(=O)(O)O)[C@@H](C(=O)O)N
- InChI: InChI=1S/C4H10NO5P/c5-3(4(6)7)1-2-11(8,9)10/h3H,1-2,5H2,(H,6,7)(H2,8,9,10)/t3-/m0/s1; Key:DDOQBQRIEWHWBT-VKHMYHEASA-N

L-AP4 (L-2-amino-4-phosphonobutyric acid) is a drug used in scientific research, which acts as a group-selective agonist for the group III metabotropic glutamate receptors (mGluR_{4}_{/}_{6}_{/}_{7}_{/}_{8}). It was the first ligand found to act as an agonist selective for this group of mGlu receptors, but does not show selectivity between the different mGluR Group III subtypes. It is widely used in the study of this receptor family and their various functions.
