= LY-341495 =

Chemical compound

Clinical data
- Other names: (2S)-2-Amino-2-[(1S,2S)-2-carboxycycloprop-1-yl]-3-(xanth-9-yl)propanoic acid

Identifiers
- IUPAC name: 2-[(1S,2S)-2-carboxycyclopropyl]-3-(9H-xanthen-9-yl)-D-alanine
- CAS Number: 201943-63-7
- ChemSpider: 7995676
- UNII: AQ73SP6QSF
- CompTox Dashboard (EPA): DTXSID50942264

Chemical and physical data
- Formula: C_{20}H_{19}NO_{5}
- Molar mass: 353.374 g·mol^{−1}
- 3D model (JSmol): Interactive image
- SMILES: C1[C@@H]([C@H]1[C@@](CC2C3=CC=CC=C3OC4=CC=CC=C24)(C(=O)O)N)C(=O)O
- InChI: InChI=1S/C20H19NO5/c21-20(19(24)25,15-9-13(15)18(22)23)10-14-11-5-1-3-7-16(11)26-17-8-4-2-6-12(14)17/h1-8,13-15H,9-10,21H2,(H,22,23)(H,24,25)/t13-,15-,20-/m0/s1; Key:VLZBRVJVCCNPRJ-KPHUOKFYSA-N

LY-341495 is a research drug developed by the pharmaceutical company Eli Lilly, which acts as a potent and selective orthosteric antagonist for the group II metabotropic glutamate receptors (mGluR_{2/3}).

It is used in scientific research in several different areas, showing antidepressant effects in animal models, increasing the behavioural effects of hallucinogenic drugs in animal tests, and increasing the analgesic effects of μ-opioid agonists, as well as modulating dopamine receptor function.

The 1-fluorocyclopropane analog has a superior pharmacokinetic profile and similar mGluR_{2/3} affinity, and making a prodrug from this with the heptyl ester increases bioavailability still further.

1-fluoro-LY-341,495 heptyl ester

== See also ==
- CECXG
