= GRIK2 =

Protein-coding gene in the species Homo sapiens

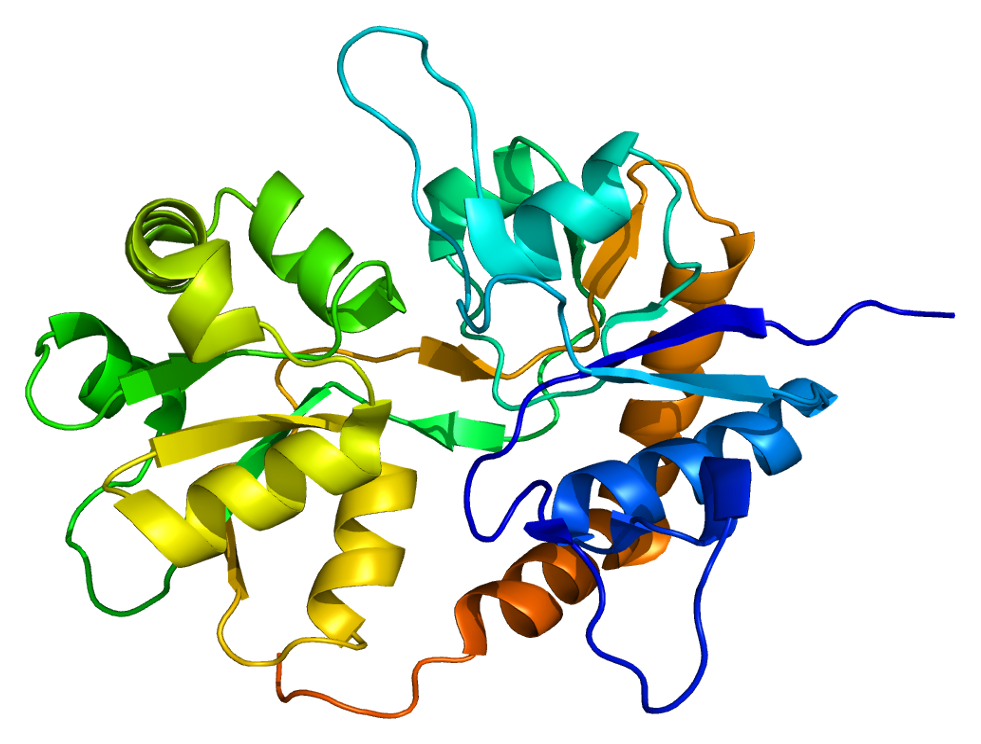

Identifiers
- Aliases: GRIK2, EAA4, GLR6, GLUK6, GLUR6, GluK2, MRT6, glutamate ionotropic receptor kainate type subunit 2, NEDLAS
- External IDs: OMIM: 138244; MGI: 95815; GeneCards: GRIK2
Available structures
| PDB | Ortholog search: PDBe RCSB |
| PDB | List of PDB id codes 3QXM, 5CMM |

Gene location (Human)
| Chr. | Chromosome 6 (human) |
| Band | 6q16.3 | Start | 100,962,701 bp |
| Band | 6q16.3 | End | 102,081,622 bp |

Gene location (Mouse)
| Chr. | Chromosome 10 (mouse) |
| Band | 10 B3|10 24.87 cM | Start | 49,094,833 bp |
| Band | 10 B3|10 24.87 cM | End | 49,788,766 bp |
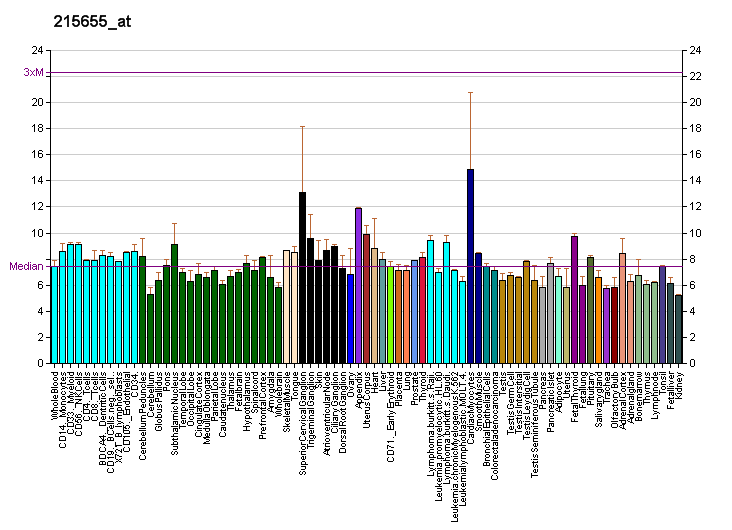

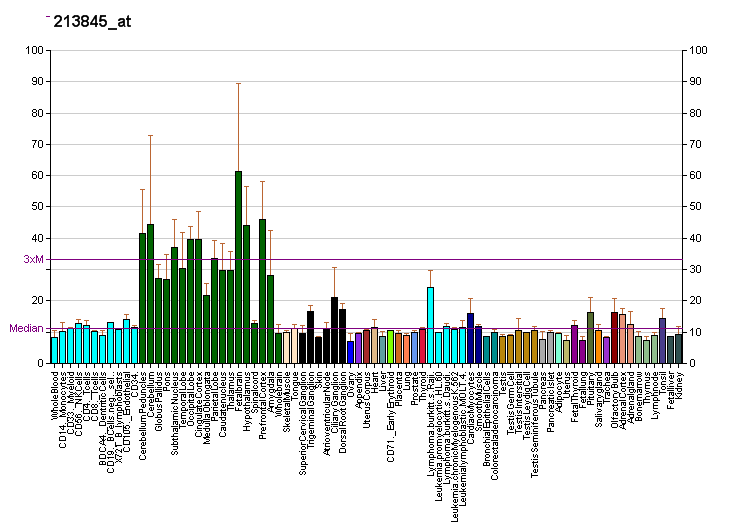
RNA expression pattern
| Bgee | Human / Mouse (ortholog); Top expressed in: cerebellar vermis; cerebellar hemisphere; right hemisphere of cerebellum; middle temporal gyrus; paraflocculus of cerebellum; Brodmann area 23; Brodmann area 10; orbitofrontal cortex; superior frontal gyrus; entorhinal cortex / Top expressed in: dentate gyrus of hippocampal formation granule cell; nucleus accumbens; inner renal medulla; lumbar subsegment of spinal cord; ventricular zone; superior frontal gyrus; spermatid; dorsal striatum; cerebellar cortex; tongue; More reference expression data |
| BioGPS | More reference expression data |
Gene ontology
| Molecular function | glutamate receptor activity; PDZ domain binding; kainate selective glutamate receptor activity; protein homodimerization activity; ion channel activity; ionotropic glutamate receptor activity; identical protein binding; ligand-gated ion channel activity; extracellularly glutamate-gated ion channel activity; signaling receptor activity; ubiquitin conjugating enzyme binding; ubiquitin protein ligase binding; ligand-gated ion channel activity involved in regulation of presynaptic membrane potential; transmitter-gated ion channel activity involved in regulation of postsynaptic membrane potential |
| Cellular component | integral component of membrane; perikaryon; postsynaptic membrane; membrane; plasma membrane; synapse; integral component of plasma membrane; cell junction; terminal bouton; axon; dendrite; dendrite cytoplasm; ionotropic glutamate receptor complex; postsynaptic density; kainate selective glutamate receptor complex; presynaptic membrane; soma; hippocampal mossy fiber to CA3 synapse; glutamatergic synapse |
| Biological process | neuron apoptotic process; glutamate receptor signaling pathway; modulation of chemical synaptic transmission; ion transport; receptor clustering; ion transmembrane transport; positive regulation of neuron apoptotic process; regulation of JNK cascade; ionotropic glutamate receptor signaling pathway; positive regulation of synaptic transmission; excitatory postsynaptic potential; negative regulation of synaptic transmission, glutamatergic; chemical synaptic transmission; behavioral fear response; cellular calcium ion homeostasis; intracellular protein transport; neuronal action potential; synaptic transmission, glutamatergic; regulation of membrane potential; negative regulation of neuron apoptotic process; regulation of long-term neuronal synaptic plasticity; regulation of short-term neuronal synaptic plasticity; inhibitory postsynaptic potential; regulation of presynaptic membrane potential |
Sources:Amigo / QuickGO
Orthologs
| Databases | NCBI: entry; OMA: entry |
| Species | Human | Mouse |
| Entrez | 2898 | 14806 |
| Ensembl | ENSG00000164418 | ENSMUSG00000056073 |
| UniProt | Q13002 | P39087 |
| RefSeq (mRNA) | NM_001166247; NM_021956; NM_175768 | NM_001111268; NM_010349 |
| RefSeq (protein) | NP_001159719; NP_068775; NP_786944 | NP_001104738; NP_034479; NP_001345795 |
| Location (UCSC) | Chr 6: 100.96 – 102.08 Mb | Chr 10: 49.09 – 49.79 Mb |
| PubMed search |
- Wikidata
| View/Edit Human | View/Edit Mouse |

Glutamate ionotropic receptor kainate type subunit 2, also known as ionotropic glutamate receptor 6 or GluR6, is a protein that in humans is encoded by the GRIK2 (or GLUR6) gene.

== Function ==
This gene encodes a subunit of a kainate glutamate receptor. This receptor may have a role in synaptic plasticity, learning, and memory. It also may be involved in the transmission of visual information from the retina to the hypothalamus. The structure and function of the encoded protein is influenced by RNA editing. Alternatively spliced transcript variants encoding distinct isoforms have been described for this gene. It has been discovered that this is a key protein, which enables mammals to feel cold sensations.

== Clinical significance ==
Homozygosity for a GRIK2 deletion-inversion mutation is associated with non-syndromic autosomal recessive intellectual disability.

== Interactions ==
GRIK2 has been shown to interact with:

- DLG1,
- DLG4,
- GRID2,
- GRIK5,
- GRIP1,
- PICK1 and
- SDCBP.

== RNA Editing ==
Pre-mRNA for several neurotransmitter receptors and ion channels are substrates for ADARs, including AMPA receptor subunits (GluR2, GluR3, GluR4) and kainate receptor subunits (GluR5, GluR6). Glutamate-gated ion channels are made up of four subunits per channel, with each subunit contributing to the pore loop structure. The pore loop structure is similar to that found in K^{+} channels (e.g. the human K_{v}1.1 channel, whose pre-mRNA is also subject to A to I RNA editing). The diversity of ionotropic glutamate receptor subunits, as well as RNA splicing, is determined by RNA editing events of the individual subunits, explaining their extremely high diversity.

=== Type ===
The type of RNA editing that occurs in the pre-mRNA of GluR6 is Adenosine to Inosine (A to I) editing.

A to I RNA editing is catalyzed by a family of adenosine deaminases acting on RNA (ADARs) that specifically recognize adenosines within double-stranded regions of pre-mRNAs and deaminate them to inosine. Inosines are recognised as guanosine by the cell's translational machinery. There are three members of the ADAR family ADARs 1–3 with ADAR1 and ADAR2 being the only enzymatically active members. ADAR1 and ADAR2 are widely expressed in tissues, while ADAR3 is restricted to the brain, where it is thought to have a regulatory role. The double-stranded regions of RNA are formed by base-pairing between residues close to region of the editing site, with residues usually in a neighboring intron, though they can occasionally be located in an exonic sequence. The region that forms base pairs with the editing region is known as an Editing Complementary Sequence (ECS).

ADARs bind interact directly with the dsRNA substrate via their double-stranded RNA binding domains. If an editing site occurs within a coding sequence, the result could be a codon change. This can lead to translation of a protein isoform due to a change in its primary protein structure. Therefore, editing can also alter protein function. A to I editing occurs in a noncoding RNA sequences such as introns, untranslated regions (UTRs), LINEs, and SINEs (especially Alu repeats). The function of A to I editing in these regions is thought to involve creation of splice sites and retention of RNAs in the nucleus amongst others.

=== Location ===
The pre-mRNA of GLUR6 is edited at amino acid positions 567, 571, and 621. The Q/R position, which gets its name as editing results in an codon change from a glutamine (Q) codon (CAG) to an arginine (R) codon (CGG), is located in the "pore loop" of the second membrane domain (M2). The Q/R site of GluR6 pre-mRNA occurs in an asymmetrical loop of three exonic and four intronic nucleotides. The Q/R editing site is also observed in GluR2 and GluR5. The Q/R site is located in a homologous position in GluR2 and in GluR6.

GluR-6 is also edited at I/V and Y/C sites, which are found in the first membrane domain (M1). At the I/V site, editing results in a codon change from (ATT) isoleucine (I) to (GTT) valine (V), while at the Y/C site, the codon change is from (TAC) tyrosine (Y) to (TGC) cysteine (C).

The RNAfold program characterised a putative double-stranded RNA (dsRNA) conformation around the Q/R site of the GluR-6 pre-mRNA. This sequence is necessary for editing at the site to occur. The possible editing complementary sequence was observed from transcript analysis to be 1.9 kb downstream from the editing site within intron 12. The ECS for the editing sites in M1 has yet to be identified but it is likely to occur at a considerable distance from the editing sites.

=== Regulation ===
Editing of the Q/R site in GluR6 pre-mRNA has been demonstrated to be developmentally regulated in rats, ranging from 0% in rat embryo to 80% at birth. This is different from the AMPA receptor subunit GluR2, which is nearly 100% edited and is not developmentally regulated. Significant amounts of both edited and non-edited forms of GluR6 transcripts are found in the adult brain. The receptor is 90% edited in all grey matter structures, while in white matter, the receptor is edited in just 10% of cases. Frequency increases from 0% in rat embryo to 85% in adult rat.

=== Consequences ===
==== Structure ====
The primary GluR6 transcripts can be edited in up to three positions. Editing at each of the three positions affects Ca^{2+} permeability of the channel.

==== Function ====
Editing plays a role in the electrophysiology of the channel. Editing at the Q/R site has been deemed to be nonessential in GluR6. It has been reported that the unedited version of GluR6 functions in the regulation of synaptic plasticity. The edited version is thought to inhibit synaptic plasticity and reduce seizure susceptibility. Mice lacking the Q/R site exhibit increased long term potentiation and are more susceptible to kainate induced seizures. The number of seizures is inversely correlated with the amount of RNA editing. Human GluR6 pre-mRNA editing is increased during seizures, possibly as an adaptive mechanism.

Up to 8 different protein isoforms can occur as a result of different combinations of editing at the three sites, giving rise to receptor variants with differing kinetics. The effect of Q/R site editing on calcium permeability appears to be dependent on editing of the I/V and Y/C sites. When both sites in TM1 (I/V and Y/C) are edited, Q/R site editing is required for calcium permeability. On the contrary, when neither the I/V nor the Y/C site is edited, receptors demonstrate high calcium permeability regardless of Q/R site editing. The co-assembly of these two isoforms generate receptors with reduced calcium permeability.

RNA editing of the Q/R site can affect inhibition of the channel by membrane fatty acids such as arachidonic acid and docosahexaenoic acid For Kainate receptors with only edited isforms, these are strongly inhibited by these fatty acids, however inclusion of just one non-edited subunit is enough to abolish this effect.

==== Dysregulation ====
Kainate-induced seizures in mice are used as a model of temporal lobe epilepsy in humans. Despite mice deficient in editing at the Q/R site of GluR6 showing increased seizure susceptibility, tissue analysis of human epilepsy patients did not show reduced editing at this site.

== See also ==
- Kainate receptor
