= GRIA3 =

Protein-coding gene in humans

Identifiers
- Aliases: GRIA3, GLUR-C, GLUR-K3, GLUR3, GLURC, GluA3, MRX94, glutamate ionotropic receptor AMPA type subunit 3, MRXSW
- External IDs: OMIM: 305915; MGI: 95810; GeneCards: GRIA3
Available structures
PDB	Ortholog search: PDBe RCSB
PDB	List of PDB id codes 3LSW, 3LSX

Gene location (Human)
Chr.	X chromosome (human)
Band	Xq25	Start	123,184,153 bp
Band	Xq25	End	123,490,915 bp

Gene location (Mouse)
Chr.	X chromosome (mouse)
Band	X A4|X 23.19 cM	Start	40,489,731 bp
Band	X A4|X 23.19 cM	End	40,767,478 bp
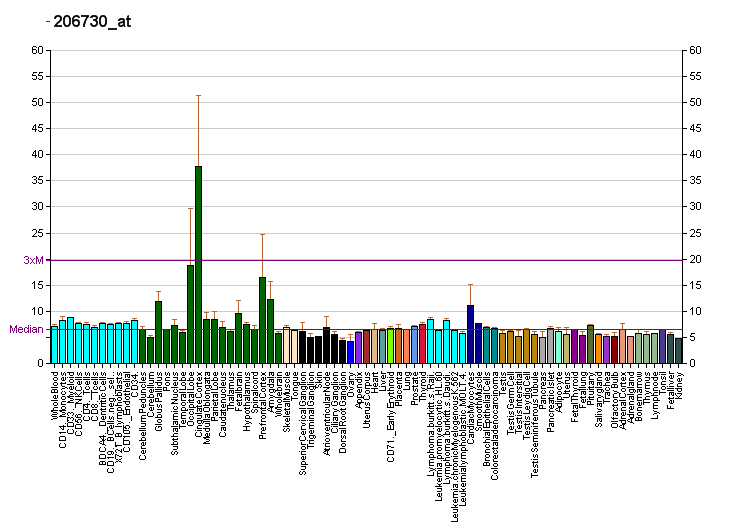

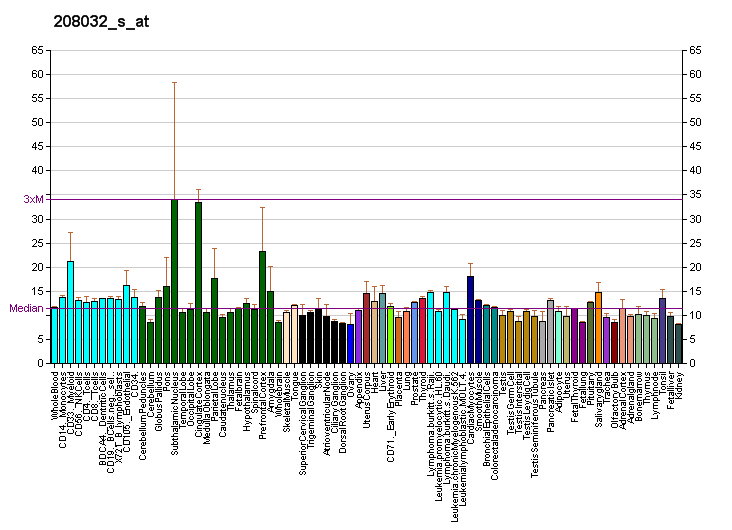
RNA expression pattern
Bgee	Human / Mouse (ortholog); Top expressed in: Brodmann area 23; middle temporal gyrus; primary visual cortex; entorhinal cortex; postcentral gyrus; superior frontal gyrus; Brodmann area 9; right frontal lobe; prefrontal cortex; hippocampus proper / Top expressed in: subiculum; anterior amygdaloid area; olfactory tubercle; dorsal striatum; lateral septal nucleus; nucleus accumbens; lateral geniculate nucleus; facial motor nucleus; lobe of cerebellum; prefrontal cortex; More reference expression data
BioGPS	More reference expression data
Gene ontology
Molecular function	ion channel activity; ionotropic glutamate receptor activity; extracellularly glutamate-gated ion channel activity; AMPA glutamate receptor activity; excitatory extracellular ligand-gated ion channel activity; amyloid-beta binding; signaling receptor activity; transmitter-gated ion channel activity involved in regulation of postsynaptic membrane potential
Cellular component	integral component of membrane; endocytic vesicle membrane; postsynaptic membrane; membrane; synapse; cell junction; AMPA glutamate receptor complex; plasma membrane; parallel fiber to Purkinje cell synapse
Biological process	glutamate receptor signaling pathway; ion transport; ion transmembrane transport; ionotropic glutamate receptor signaling pathway; transport; excitatory postsynaptic potential; regulation of postsynaptic membrane potential; regulation of NMDA receptor activity
Sources:Amigo / QuickGO
Orthologs
Databases	NCBI: entry; OMA: entry
Species	Human	Mouse
Entrez	2892	53623
Ensembl	ENSG00000125675	ENSMUSG00000001986
UniProt	P42263	Q9Z2W9
RefSeq (mRNA)	NM_181894; NM_000828; NM_001256743; NM_007325	NM_001281929; NM_016886; NM_001290451; NM_001358361
RefSeq (protein)	NP_000819; NP_001243672; NP_015564	NP_001268858; NP_001277380; NP_058582; NP_001345290
Location (UCSC)	Chr X: 123.18 – 123.49 Mb	Chr X: 40.49 – 40.77 Mb
PubMed search
- Wikidata
View/Edit Human	View/Edit Mouse

Glutamate receptor 3 is a protein that in humans is encoded by the GRIA3 gene.

== Function ==
Glutamate receptors are the predominant excitatory neurotransmitter receptors in the mammalian brain and are activated in a variety of normal neurophysiologic processes. These receptors are heteromeric protein complexes with multiple subunits, each possessing transmembrane regions, and all arranged to form a ligand-gated ion channel. The classification of glutamate receptors is based on their activation by different pharmacologic agonists. This gene belongs to a family of alpha-amino-3-hydroxy-5-methyl-4-isoxazole propionate (AMPA) receptors. Alternative splicing at this locus results in several different isoforms which may vary in their signal transduction properties.

Genome studies have uncovered a tentative link between defective GRIA3 variants and a highly elevated risk of schizophrenia.

== Interactions ==
GRIA3 has been shown to interact with GRIP1 and PICK1.

== RNA editing ==
Several ion channels and neurotransmitters receptors pre-mRNA as substrates for ADARs. This includes 5 subunits of the glutamate receptor: ionotropic AMPA glutamate receptor subunits (GluA2, GluA3, GluA4) and kainate receptor subunits (GluK1, GluK2). Glutamate gated ion channels are made up of four subunits per channel with each subunit contributing to the pore loop structure. The pore loop structure is related to that found in K^{+} channels (e.g., human K_{v}1.1 channel). The human K_{v}1.1 channel pre mRNA is also subject to A to I RNA editing. The function of the glutamate receptors is in the mediation of fast neurotransmission to the brain. The diversity of the subunits is determined, as well as rna splicing by RNA editing events of the individual subunits. This give rise to the necessarily high diversity of these receptors. GluR3 is a gene product of the GRIA3 gene and its pre-mRNA is subject to RNA editing.

=== Type ===
A to I RNA editing is catalyzed by a family of adenosine deaminases acting on RNA (ADARs) that specifically recognize adenosines within double-stranded regions of pre-mRNAs and deaminate them to inosine. Inosines are recognised as guanosine by the cells translational machinery. There are three members of the ADAR family ADARs 1-3, with ADAR1 and ADAR2 being the only enzymatically active members. ADAR3 is thought to have a regulatory role in the brain. ADAR1 and ADAR2 are widely expressed in tissues while ADAR3 is restricted to the brain. The double-stranded regions of RNA are formed by base-pairing between residues in the close to region of the editing site with residues usually in a neighboring intron but can be an exonic sequence. The region that base pairs with the editing region is known as an Editing Complementary Sequence (ECS)

=== Location ===
The pre-mRNA of this subunit is edited at one position. The R/G editing site is located in exon 13 between the M3 and M4 regions. Editing results in a codon change from an arginine (AGA) to a glycine (GGA). The location of editing corresponds to a bipartite ligand interaction domain of the receptor. The R/G site is found at amino acid 769 immediately before the 38-amino-acid-long flip and flop modules introduced by alternative splicing. Flip and Flop forms are present in both edited and nonedited versions of this protein. The editing complementary sequence (ECS) is found in an intronic sequence close to the exon. The intronic sequence includes a 5' splice site. The predicted double stranded region is 30 base pairs in length. The adenosine residue is mismatched in genomically encoded transcript, however this is not the case following editing. Despite similar sequences to the Q/R site of GluR-B, editing at this site does not occur in GluR-3 pre-mRNA. Editing results in the targeted adenosine, which is mismatched prior to editing in the double-stranded RNA structure to become matched after editing. The intronic sequence involved contains a 5' donor splice site.

=== Conservation ===
Editing also occurs in rat.

=== Regulation ===
Editing of GluR-3 is regulated in rat brain from low levels in embryonic stage to a large increase in editing levels at birth. In humans, 80-90% of GRIA3 transcripts are edited. The absence of the Q/R site editing in this glutamate receptor subunit is due to the absence of necessary intronic sequence required to form a duplex.

=== Consequences ===
==== Structure ====
Editing results in a codon change from (AGA) to (GGA), an R to a G change at the editing site.

==== Function ====
Editing at R/G site allows for faster recovery from desensitisation. Unedited Glu-R at this site have slower recovery rates. Editing, therefore, allow sustained response to rapid stimuli. A crosstalk between editing and splicing is likely to occur here. Editing takes place before splicing. All AMPA receptors occur in flip and flop alternatively spliced variants. AMPA receptors that occur in the Flop form desenstise faster than the flip form. Editing is also thought to affect splicing at this site.

== See also ==
- AMPA receptor
