= C1QL1 =

Protein-coding gene in the species Homo sapiens

Identifiers
- Aliases: C1QL1, C1QRF, C1QTNF14, CRF, complement component 1, q subcomponent-like 1, complement C1q like 1, CTRP14
- External IDs: OMIM: 611586; MGI: 1344400; GeneCards: C1QL1
Available structures
PDB	Ortholog search: PDBe RCSB
PDB	List of PDB id codes 4D7Y, 4QQ2

Gene location (Human)
Chr.	Chromosome 17 (human)
Band	17q21.31	Start	44,959,693 bp
Band	17q21.31	End	44,968,303 bp

Gene location (Mouse)
Chr.	Chromosome 11 (mouse)
Band	11|11 E1	Start	102,830,090 bp
Band	11|11 E1	End	102,837,514 bp
RNA expression pattern
Bgee	Human / Mouse (ortholog); Top expressed in: amygdala; anterior cingulate cortex; hypothalamus; C1 segment; right frontal lobe; beta cell; nucleus accumbens; hippocampus proper; prefrontal cortex; caudate nucleus / Top expressed in: neural layer of retina; gastrula; inferior olivary nucleus; corpus callosum; lumbar subsegment of spinal cord; submandibular gland; central gray substance of midbrain; tail of embryo; optic nerve; embryo; More reference expression data
BioGPS	n/a
Gene ontology
Molecular function	protein binding; signaling receptor binding; molecular function
Cellular component	cytoplasm; extracellular region; collagen; climbing fiber; presynapse; synaptic cleft; cellular component
Biological process	locomotory behavior; maintenance of synapse structure; neuron remodeling; motor learning
Sources:Amigo / QuickGO
Orthologs
Databases	NCBI: entry; OMA: entry
Species	Human	Mouse
Entrez	10882	23829
Ensembl	ENSG00000131094	ENSMUSG00000045532
UniProt	O75973	O88992
RefSeq (mRNA)	NM_006688	NM_011795
RefSeq (protein)	NP_006679	NP_035925
Location (UCSC)	Chr 17: 44.96 – 44.97 Mb	Chr 11: 102.83 – 102.84 Mb
PubMed search
- Wikidata
View/Edit Human	View/Edit Mouse

The complement component 1, q subcomponent-like 1 (or C1QL1) is encoded by a gene located at chromosome 17q21.31. It is a secreted protein and is 258 amino acids in length. The protein is widely expressed but its expression is highest in the brain and may also be involved in regulation of motor control. The pre-mRNA of this protein is subject to RNA editing.

== Protein function ==
Its physiological function is unknown. It is a member of the C1q domain proteins which have important signalling roles in inflammation and in adaptive immunity.

== RNA editing ==
=== Editing type ===
The pre-mRNA of this protein is subject to A to I RNA editing, which is catalyzed by a family of adenosine deaminases acting on RNA (ADARs) that specifically recognize adenosines within double-stranded regions of pre-mRNAs and deaminate them to inosine. Inosines are recognised as guanosine by the cell's translational machinery. There are three members of the ADAR family: ADARs 1-3, with ADAR 1 and ADAR 2 being the only enzymatically active members. ADAR 3 is thought to have a regulatory role in the brain. ADAR 1 and ADAR 2 are widely expressed in tissues while ADAR 3 is restricted to the brain. The double-stranded regions of RNA are formed by base-pairing between residues in a region complementary to the region of the editing site. This complementary region is usually found in a neighbouring intron but can also be located in an exonic sequence. The region that pairs with the editing region is known as an Editing Complementary Sequence (ECS).

=== Editing sites ===
The candidate editing sites were determined experimentally by comparison of cDNA sequences and genomically encoded DNA from the same individual to avoid single nucleotide polymorphisms (SNPs). Two of the three editing sites found in mouse gene were found in the human transcript. However, only the Q/R site was detected in all RNA, with the T/A site detected just once. Both sites are found within exon 1.

Q/R site

This site is found in exon 1 at position 66. Editing results in a codon change from a glutamine codon to an arginine codon.

T/A site

This site is also found in exon 1, at position 63. It was only detected in one genomic sample indicating that the edited residue may be an SNP. However, the secondary structure of the RNA is predicted, around the editing site, to be highly conserved in mice and humans. This indicates that the T/A site may still be shown to be a site of A to I RNA editing. Editing at this site would result in an amino acid change from a threonine to an alanine.

The ECS is also predicted to be found within exon 1 at a location 5' to the editing region.

=== Editing regulation ===
Editing is differentially expressed in the cerebellum and cortex. This regulation is also present in mice suggesting conservation of editing regulation. No editing has been detected in human lung, heart, kidney or spleen tissue.

=== Evolutionary conservation ===
The sequence of exon 1 is highly conserved in mammalian species and editing of the pre-mRNA of this protein is likely to occur in mice, rat, dog and cow as well as humans. Even though the ECS is not conserved in non-mammals, an alternative ECS has been predicted in Zebrafish with a similar structure but in a different location. The Ecs is found downstream of the editing sites.

=== Effects on Protein structure ===
These predicted editing sites result in the translation of an arginine instead of a glutamine at the Q/R site and an alanine instead of a threonine at the T/A site. These codon changes are nonsynomonous. Since the editing sites are located just before a collagen like trimerization domain, editing may effect protein oligomerization. This region is also likely to be a protease domain. It is not known if the amino acid changes caused by editing could have an effect on these domains.
