= C11H11NO =

The molecular formula C_{11}H_{11}NO (molar mass: 173.211 g/mol, exact mass: 173.0841 u) may refer to:

- 4-Amino-2-methyl-1-naphthol (Vitamin K_{5})
- 4-Amino-3-methyl-1-naphthol (Vitamin K_{7})
- BFAI (5,6-benzofuranyl-2-aminoindane)
