= C11H12N2 =

The molecular formula C_{11}H_{12}N_{2} (molar mass: 172.23 g/mol, exact mass: 172.1000 u) may refer to:

- 2-Methylnaphthalene-1,4-diamine (vitamin K_{6})
- RU-27849
- Tryptoline, or tetrahydronorharmane
