= Brenda L. Bass =

Professor of Biochemistry

- Education: Colorado College, University of Colorado, Boulder
- Scientific career
- Fields: Biochemistry
- Workplaces: University of Utah
- Doctoral advisor: Thomas Cech

Brenda L. Bass is a Distinguished Professor of Biochemistry at the University of Utah who holds the H.A. and Edna Benning Endowed Chair. She is also an adjunct professor of human genetics and an investigator at the Huntsman Cancer Institute. Her research focuses on RNA silencing and the cellular dynamics of double-stranded RNA. She was elected to the National Academy of Sciences in 2015.

== Education ==
Bass attended Colorado College as an undergraduate and received a B.A. in chemistry in 1977. She was a graduate student at the University of Colorado, Boulder and received her Ph.D. under the supervision of Thomas Cech in 1985. She then worked as a postdoctoral fellow with Harold Weintraub at the Fred Hutchinson Cancer Research Center from 1985 to 1989, where she discovered a class of enzymes known as ADARs (double-stranded RNA-specific adenosine deaminases).

== Academic career and research ==
Bass joined the faculty at the University of Utah in 1989. She was named a Distinguished Professor in 2007 and given the H. A. and Edna Benning Chair in 2009. Research in Bass' laboratory focuses on RNA silencing and the cellular dynamics of double-stranded RNA (dsRNA) and double-stranded RNA binding proteins. She has continued to work with the ADAR enzymes she discovered during her postdoctoral work, as well as with Dicer, a key ribonuclease enzyme in the RNA silencing pathway. The research group also studies how cells respond to long dsRNA molecules of likely viral origin, which may give rise to inflammatory responses. Some of her work on RNA interference was the subject of an inventorship dispute initiated by the University of Utah involving patents by Thomas Tuschl licensed to Alnylam; the lawsuit was not successful.

Bass was an attendee at early meetings at Cold Spring Harbor Laboratory that gave rise to the RNA Society, a scientific society for RNA researchers. The society publishes the journal RNA, on whose editorial board Bass has served since 1995. She also served as president of the society in 2007. In 2026, Dr. Bass received the RNA Society Lifetime Achievement in Science Award.

Bass was a Howard Hughes Medical Institute investigator from 1994 to 2009. She was elected to the American Academy of Arts and Sciences in 2007, received the National Institutes of Health Director's Pioneer Award in 2011, and was elected a fellow of the American Association for the Advancement of Science the same year. In 2015, she was elected to the National Academy of Sciences.

In March 2024, Dr. Bass delivered a keynote address at the CSB Cutting Lecture Series at Stanford University, where she discussed the roles of helicases in antiviral defense, offering new insights into how the body's defense mechanisms respond to viral infections.
