= Potassium channel RNA editing signal =

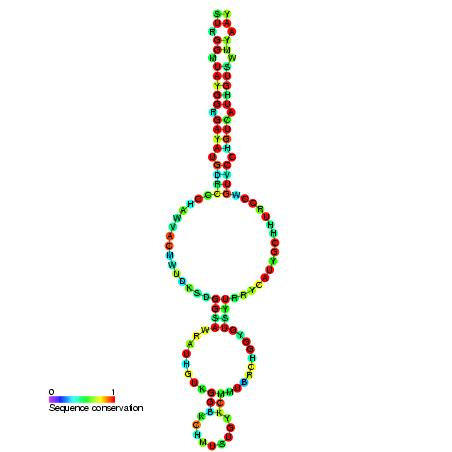
- Predicted secondary structure and sequence conservation of K_chan_RES

Identifiers
- Symbol: K_chan_RES
- Rfam: RF00485

Other data
- RNA type: Cis-reg
- Domain(s): Eukaryota
- SO: SO:0000233
- PDB structures: PDBe

The potassium channel RNA editing signal is an RNA element found in human Kv1.1 and its homologues which directs the efficient modification of an adenosine to inosine by an adenosine deaminase acting on RNA (ADAR). The ADAR modification causes an isoleucine/valine recoding event which lies in the ion-conducting pore of the potassium channel. It is thought that this editing event targets the process of fast inactivation and allows a more rapid recovery from inactivation at negative potentials.
