= Wu syndrome =

Genetic disorder

Wu syndrome, also known as X-linked Wu-type intellectual disability, is a rare genetic disorder caused by mutations in the GRIA3 gene located on chromosome Xq25. Currently, there is no FDA-approved treatment for this condition. The GRIA3 gene encodes Glutamate Receptor 3 (GLUA3), which is a member of the glutamate receptor family.

== Pathophysiology ==
Glutamate receptors are biochemically categorized into two groups: ionotropic and metabotropic glutamate receptors. Under normal conditions, glutamate receptors play a crucial role in brain functions. However, in cases of high glutamate concentrations in the central nervous system, the receptors lose their original function and exhibit neurotoxic effects. Consequently, prolonged activation of glutamate receptors leads to excitotoxicity, a process that plays a significant role in neurodegeneration.

== Epidemiology ==
According to Orphanet data, the prevalence of Wu syndrome is estimated to be <1/1,000,000.

== Clinical features ==
- Short stature
- Asthenic body habitus
- Macrocephaly
- Brachycephaly
- Prominent supraorbital ridges
- Reduced muscle mass
- Impaired intellectual development
- Autistic features

== Causes ==
Wu syndrome is inherited in an X-linked recessive manner.

=== Consanguineous marriages ===
One of the primary contributing factors to the occurrence of Wu syndrome is consanguineous marriage. Such marriages also increase the likelihood of genetic disorders such as cystic fibrosis and sickle cell anemia in offspring compared to couples who are not closely related.
