= KCNA1 =

Protein-coding gene in the species Homo sapiens

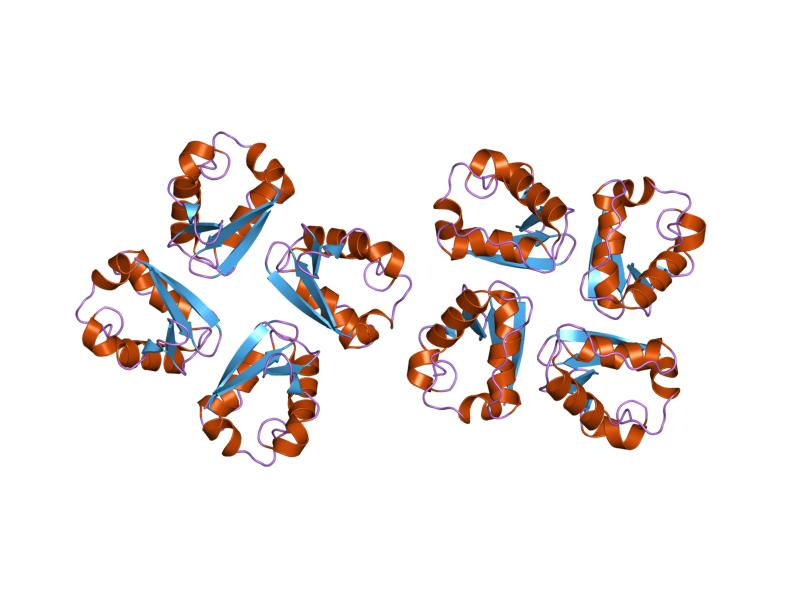

Identifiers
- Aliases: KCNA1, AEMK, EA1, HBK1, HUK1, KV1.1, MBK1, MK1, RBK1, potassium voltage-gated channel subfamily A member 1
- External IDs: OMIM: 176260; MGI: 96654; GeneCards: KCNA1
Available structures
| PDB | Ortholog search: PDBe RCSB |
| PDB | List of PDB id codes 2AFL |

Gene location (Human)
| Chr. | Chromosome 12 (human) |
| Band | 12p13.32 | Start | 4,909,905 bp |
| Band | 12p13.32 | End | 4,918,256 bp |

Gene location (Mouse)
| Chr. | Chromosome 6 (mouse) |
| Band | 6 F3|6 61.57 cM | Start | 126,617,360 bp |
| Band | 6 F3|6 61.57 cM | End | 126,623,347 bp |
RNA expression pattern
| Bgee | Human / Mouse (ortholog); Top expressed in: endothelial cell; Brodmann area 23; middle temporal gyrus; cerebellar hemisphere; primary visual cortex; right hemisphere of cerebellum; lateral nuclear group of thalamus; postcentral gyrus; putamen; caudate nucleus / Top expressed in: sciatic nerve; pontine nuclei; deep cerebellar nuclei; lateral geniculate nucleus; medulla oblongata; medial vestibular nucleus; lobe of cerebellum; cerebellar vermis; olfactory tubercle; inferior colliculi; More reference expression data |
| BioGPS | n/a |
Gene ontology
| Molecular function | potassium channel activity; delayed rectifier potassium channel activity; voltage-gated ion channel activity; potassium ion transmembrane transporter activity; ion channel activity; protein binding; voltage-gated potassium channel activity; disordered domain specific binding; voltage-gated ion channel activity involved in regulation of presynaptic membrane potential; voltage-gated ion channel activity involved in regulation of postsynaptic membrane potential |
| Cellular component | axon terminus; juxtaparanode region of axon; integral component of membrane; cytosol; perikaryon; cell projection; membrane; plasma membrane; synapse; integral component of plasma membrane; cell surface; cell junction; soma; dendrite; axon; potassium channel complex; apical plasma membrane; endoplasmic reticulum; paranode region of axon; presynaptic membrane; cytoplasmic vesicle; voltage-gated potassium channel complex; calyx of Held; glutamatergic synapse; integral component of postsynaptic membrane; integral component of presynaptic membrane |
| Biological process | regulation of muscle contraction; detection of mechanical stimulus involved in sensory perception of pain; cellular response to magnesium ion; startle response; regulation of membrane potential; cell communication by electrical coupling; neuronal signal transduction; regulation of ion transmembrane transport; ion transport; magnesium ion homeostasis; potassium ion transport; brain development; neuromuscular process; transmembrane transport; potassium ion transmembrane transport; neuroblast proliferation; detection of mechanical stimulus involved in sensory perception of touch; protein homooligomerization; hippocampus development; neuronal action potential; chemical synaptic transmission; positive regulation of voltage-gated potassium channel activity; regulation of postsynaptic membrane potential; regulation of presynaptic membrane potential |
Sources:Amigo / QuickGO
Orthologs
| Databases | NCBI: entry; OMA: entry |
| Species | Human | Mouse |
| Entrez | 3736 | 16485 |
| Ensembl | ENSG00000111262 | ENSMUSG00000047976 |
| UniProt | Q09470 | P16388 |
| RefSeq (mRNA) | NM_000217 | NM_010595 |
| RefSeq (protein) | NP_000208 | NP_034725 |
| Location (UCSC) | Chr 12: 4.91 – 4.92 Mb | Chr 6: 126.62 – 126.62 Mb |
| PubMed search |
- Wikidata
| View/Edit Human | View/Edit Mouse |

Potassium voltage-gated channel subfamily A member 1 also known as K_{v}1.1 is a shaker related voltage-gated potassium channel that in humans is encoded by the KCNA1 gene. Isaacs syndrome is a result of an autoimmune reaction against the K_{v}1.1 ion channel.

== Genomics ==
The gene is located on the Watson (plus) strand of the short arm of chromosome 12 (12p13.32). The gene itself is 8,348 bases in length and encodes a protein of 495 amino acids (predicted molecular weight 56.466 kilodaltons).

== Alternative names ==
The recommended name for this protein is potassium voltage-gated channel subfamily A member 1 but a number of alternatives have been used in the literature including HuK1 (human K^{+} channel I), RBK1 (rubidium potassium channel 1), MBK (mouse brain K^{+} channel), voltage gated potassium channel HBK1, voltage gated potassium channel subunit K_{v}1.1, voltage-gated K^{+} channel HuKI and AEMK (associated with myokymia with periodic ataxia).

== Structure ==
The protein is believed to have six domains (S1-S6) with the loop between S5 and S6 forming the channel pore. This region also has a conserved selectivity filter motif. The functional channel is a homotetramer. The N-terminus of the protein associates with β subunits. These subunits regulate channel inactivation as well as its expression. The C-terminus is associated with a PDZ domain protein involved in channel targeting.

== Function ==
The protein functions as a potassium selective channel through which the potassium ion may pass in consensus with the electrochemical gradient. They play a role in repolarisation of membranes.

== RNA editing ==
The pre-mRNA of this protein is subject to RNA editing.

=== Type ===
A to I RNA editing is catalyzed by a family of adenosine deaminases acting on RNA (ADARs) that specifically recognize adenosines within double-stranded regions of pre-mRNAs (e.g. Potassium channel RNA editing signal) and deaminate them to inosine. Inosines are recognised as guanosine by the cells translational machinery. There are three members of the ADAR family ADARs 1-3 with ADAR1 and ADAR2 being the only enzymatically active members. ADAR3 is thought to have a regulatory role in the brain. ADAR1 and ADAR2 are widely expressed in tissues while ADAR3 is restricted to the brain. The double stranded regions of RNA are formed by base-pairing between residues in the region close to the editing site with residues usually in a neighboring intron but can sometimes be an exonic sequence too. The region that base pairs with the editing region is known as an Editing Complementary Sequence (ECS).

=== Location ===
The modified residue is found at amino acid 400 of the final protein. This is located in the sixth transmembrane region found, which corresponds to the inner vestibule of the pore. A stem loop hairpin structure mediates the RNA editing. ADAR2 is likely to be the preferred editing enzyme at the I/V site. Editing results in a codon alteration from ATT to GTT, resulting in an amino acid change from isoleucine to valine. ADAR2 enzyme is the major editing enzyme. The MFOLD programme predicted that the minimum region required for editing would form an imperfect inverted repeat hairpin. This region is composed of a 114 base pairs. Similar regions have been identified in mouse and rat. The edited adenosine is found in a 6-base pair duplex region. Mutation experiment in the region near the 6-base pair duplex have shown that the specific bases in this region were also essential for editing to occur. The region required for editing is unusual in that the hairpin structure is formed by exonic sequences only. In the majority of A to I editing the ECS is found within an intronic sequence.

=== Conservation ===
The editing is highly conserved having been observed in squid, fruit fly, mouse, and rat.

=== Regulation ===
Editing levels vary in different tissues: 17% in the caudate nucleus, 68% in the spinal cord, and 77% in the medulla.

=== Consequences ===
==== Structure ====
Editing results in a codon (I/V) change from (ATT) to (GTT) resulting in translation of a valine instead of an isoleucine at the position of the editing site. Valine has a larger side-chain. RNA editing at this position occurs at a highly conserved ion conducting pore of the channel. This may affect the channels role in the process of fast inactivation.

==== Function ====
Voltage-dependent potassium channels modulate excitability by opening and closing a potassium selective pore in response to voltage. The flow of potassium ions is interrupted by interaction of an inactivating particle, an auxiliary protein in humans but an intrinsic part of the channel in other species. The I to V amino acid change is thought to disrupt the hydrophobic interaction between the inactivating particle and the pore lining. This interrupts the process of fast inactivation. Activation kinetics are unaffected by RNA editing. Changes in inactivation kinetics affect the duration and frequency of the action potential. An edited channel passes more current and has a shorter action potential than the non-edited type due to the inability of the inactivating particle to interact with the residue in the ion-conducting pore of the channel. This was determined by electrophysiology analysis. The length of time the membrane is depolarised is decreased, which also reduces the efficiency of transmitter release. Since editing can cause amino acid changes in 1- 4 in potassium channel tetramers, it can have a wide variety of effects on channel inactivation.

=== Dysregulation ===
Changes in the process of fast inactivation are known to have behavioral and neurological consequences in vivo.

== Clinical ==
Mutations in this gene cause episodic ataxia type 1.

== See also ==
- GABRA3 - a channel subunit which undergoes similar RNA editing
