= 2-Methylnaphthalene-1,4-diamine =

Names
- Preferred IUPAC name 2-Methylnaphthalene-1,4-diamine

Identifiers
CAS Number	83-68-1
3D model (JSmol)	Interactive image
ChemSpider	8012912
PubChem CID	9837191
UNII	YL68XZ7ZVU
CompTox Dashboard (EPA)	DTXSID30431565
- InChI: InChI=1S/C11H12N2/c1-7-6-10(12)8-4-2-3-5-9(8)11(7)13/h2-6H,12-13H2,1H3 Key: BCKLPBBBFNWJHH-UHFFFAOYSA-N
- SMILES: CC1=C(C2=CC=CC=C2C(=C1)N)N

Properties
Chemical formula	C_{11}H_{12}N_{2}
Molar mass	172.231 g·mol^{−1}
Appearance	yellowish crystals
Melting point	110-113 °C
Solubility in water	dihydrochloride is freely soluble
- Except where otherwise noted, data are given for materials in their standard state (at 25 °C [77 °F], 100 kPa). Infobox references

2-Methylnaphthalene-1,4-diamine is a synthetic menadione analog with vitamin K activity.

2-Methylnaphthalene-1,4-diamine was first synthesized in 1925. In 1942 two different research groups noted the vitamin K activity of the compound. It forms a dihydrochloride salt (C_{11}H_{14}Cl_{2}N_{2}) with hydrochloric acid and one of the aforementioned research groups suggested the name vitamin K_{6} for the salt.

2-Methylnaphthalene-1,4-diamine and its dihydrochloride can be made from 2-methylnaphthalene or its close analogs. Dihydrochloride blackens without melting at about 300 °C.

4-Amino-3-methyl-1-naphthol or its dihydrochloride have not been used as commercial medicinal forms of vitamin K unlike phylloquinone and menadione for example.

Oral toxicity of dihydrochloride for rats is approximately the same as for 4-amino-2-methyl-1-naphthol hydrochloride.
