= PICK1 =

Protein-coding gene in the species Homo sapiens

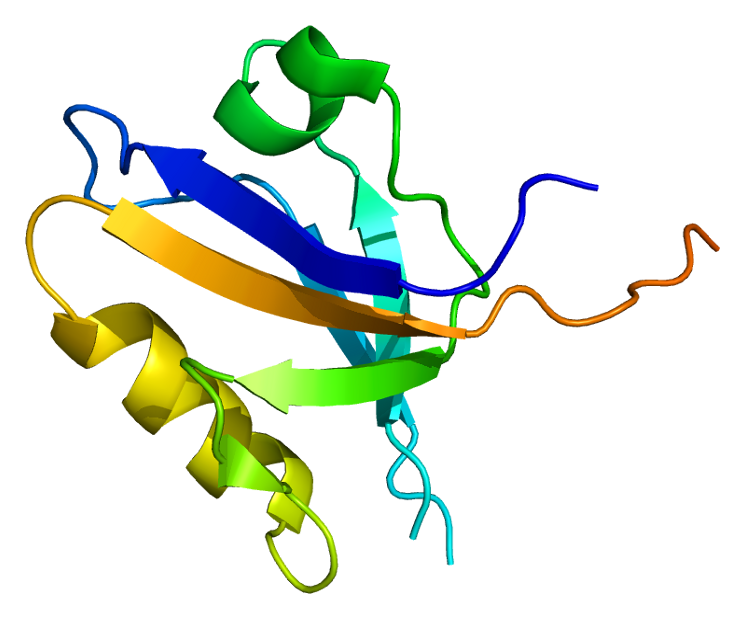

Identifiers
- Aliases: PICK1, PICK, PRKCABP, protein interacting with PRKCA 1
- External IDs: OMIM: 605926; MGI: 894645; GeneCards: PICK1
Available structures
PDB	Ortholog search: PDBe RCSB
PDB	List of PDB id codes 2GZV

Gene location (Human)
Chr.	Chromosome 22 (human)
Band	22q13.1	Start	38,056,311 bp
Band	22q13.1	End	38,075,701 bp

Gene location (Mouse)
Chr.	Chromosome 15 (mouse)
Band	15|15 E1	Start	79,113,373 bp
Band	15|15 E1	End	79,133,684 bp
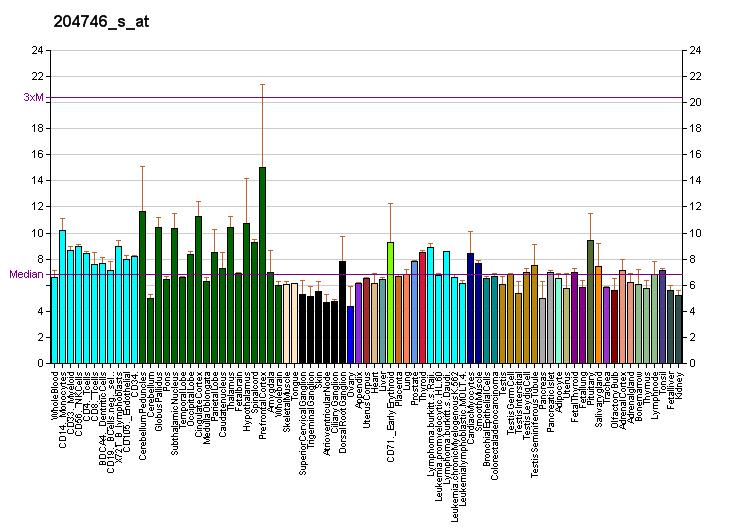
RNA expression pattern
Bgee	Human / Mouse (ortholog); Top expressed in: anterior pituitary; right hemisphere of cerebellum; right uterine tube; left ovary; right frontal lobe; left testis; right testis; gastric mucosa; right ovary; body of pancreas / Top expressed in: neural layer of retina; spermatid; muscle of thigh; spermatocyte; superior frontal gyrus; right kidney; lip; crypt of lieberkuhn of small intestine; extensor digitorum longus muscle; ventricular zone; More reference expression data
BioGPS	More reference expression data
Gene ontology
Molecular function	protein domain specific binding; Arp2/3 complex binding; metal ion binding; actin filament binding; protein C-terminus binding; protein binding; identical protein binding; enzyme binding; actin binding; signaling receptor binding; G protein-coupled receptor binding; protein kinase C binding; phospholipid binding
Cellular component	cytoplasm; endocytic vesicle membrane; postsynaptic membrane; Golgi apparatus; postsynaptic density; membrane; plasma membrane; synapse; cell junction; perinuclear region of cytoplasm; neuron projection; cytoskeleton; presynaptic membrane; mitochondrion; cytosol; aggresome; synaptic vesicle; trans-Golgi network membrane; postsynaptic early endosome
Biological process	cellular response to glucose starvation; glial cell development; retrograde vesicle-mediated transport, Golgi to endoplasmic reticulum; positive regulation of receptor internalization; neuronal ion channel clustering; regulation of Arp2/3 complex-mediated actin nucleation; monoamine transport; receptor clustering; DNA methylation involved in gamete generation; negative regulation of Arp2/3 complex-mediated actin nucleation; dendritic spine organization; dendritic spine maintenance; protein phosphorylation; protein kinase C-activating G protein-coupled receptor signaling pathway; long-term depression; cellular response to decreased oxygen levels; DNA methylation involved in embryo development; intracellular protein transport
Sources:Amigo / QuickGO
Orthologs
Databases	NCBI: entry; OMA: entry
Species	Human	Mouse
Entrez	9463	18693
Ensembl	ENSG00000100151	ENSMUSG00000068206
UniProt	Q9NRD5	Q62083
RefSeq (mRNA)	NM_001039583; NM_001039584; NM_012407	NM_001045558; NM_008837
RefSeq (protein)	NP_001034672; NP_001034673; NP_036539; NP_001034672.1; NP_001034673.1 NP_036539.1	n/a
Location (UCSC)	Chr 22: 38.06 – 38.08 Mb	Chr 15: 79.11 – 79.13 Mb
PubMed search
- Wikidata
View/Edit Human	View/Edit Mouse

Protein Interacting with C Kinase - 1 is a protein that in humans is encoded by the PICK1 gene.

== Function ==
The protein encoded by this gene contains a PDZ domain, through which it interacts with protein kinase C, alpha (PRKCA). This protein may function as an adaptor that binds to and organizes the subcellular localization of a variety of membrane proteins. It has been shown to interact with multiple glutamate receptor subtypes, monoamine plasma membrane transporters, as well as non-voltage gated sodium channels, and may target PRKCA to these membrane proteins and thus regulate their distribution and function. This protein has also been found to act as an anchoring protein that specifically targets PRKCA to mitochondria in a ligand-specific manner. Three transcript variants encoding the same protein have been found for this gene.

== Interactions ==
PICK1 has been shown to interact with:

- ACCN2,
- BNC1,
- Dopamine transporter,
- GRIA2,
- GRIA3,
- GRIA4,
- GRIK1,
- GRIK2,
- GRIK3,
- HER2/neu,
- Metabotropic glutamate receptor 3, and
- Metabotropic glutamate receptor 7.
