= GRIP1 (gene) =

Protein-coding gene in the species Homo sapiens

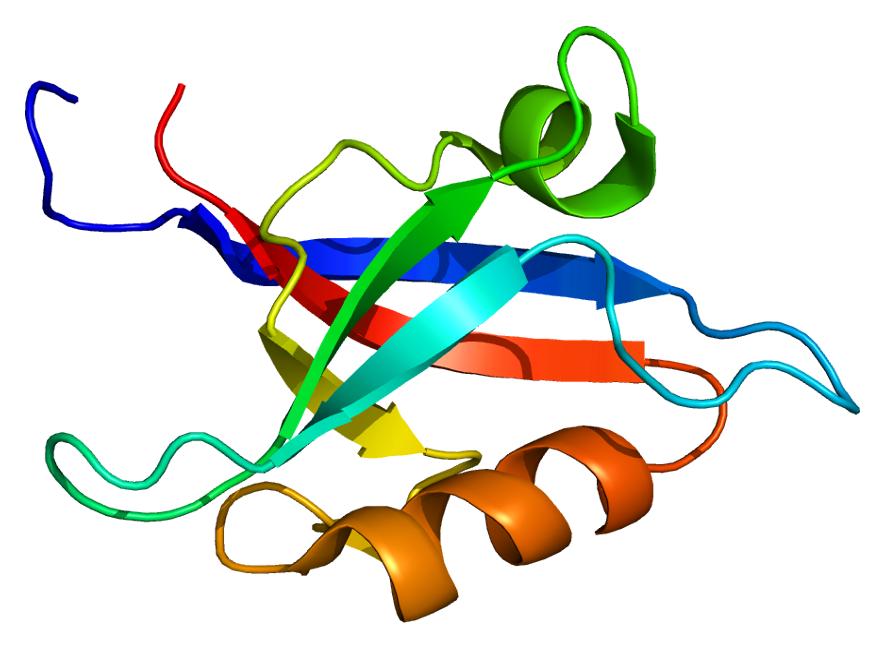

Identifiers
- Aliases: GRIP1, GRIP, glutamate receptor interacting protein 1, FRASRS3
- External IDs: OMIM: 604597; MGI: 1921303; GeneCards: GRIP1
Available structures
PDB	Ortholog search: PDBe RCSB
PDB	List of PDB id codes 2JIL

Gene location (Human)
Chr.	Chromosome 12 (human)
Band	12q14.3	Start	66,347,431 bp
Band	12q14.3	End	67,069,162 bp

Gene location (Mouse)
Chr.	Chromosome 10 (mouse)
Band	10 D2|10 67.33 cM	Start	119,289,735 bp
Band	10 D2|10 67.33 cM	End	119,923,166 bp
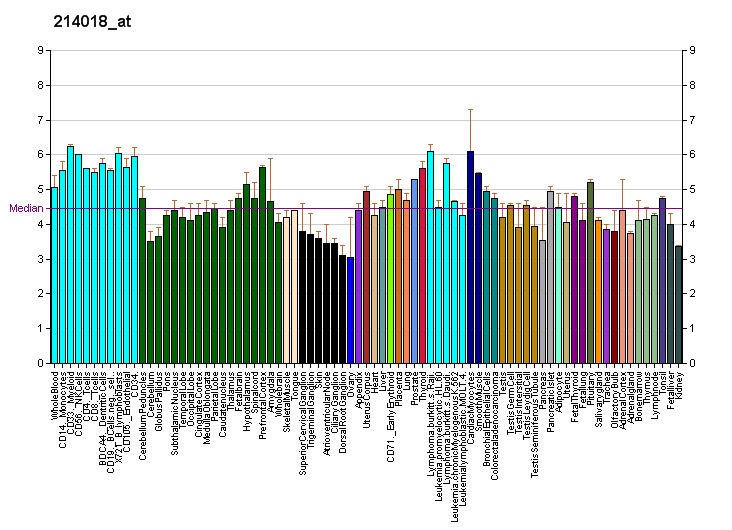
RNA expression pattern
Bgee	Human / Mouse (ortholog); Top expressed in: ganglionic eminence; ventricular zone; seminal vesicula; secondary oocyte; testicle; skin of abdomen; placenta; buccal mucosa cell; skin of leg; right uterine tube / Top expressed in: Rostral migratory stream; spermatid; seminiferous tubule; habenula; secondary oocyte; lumbar spinal ganglion; olfactory bulb; zygote; barrel cortex; motor neuron; More reference expression data
BioGPS	More reference expression data
Gene ontology
Molecular function	beta-catenin binding; transcription coactivator activity; protein C-terminus binding; protein binding; androgen receptor binding; glucocorticoid receptor binding; signaling receptor complex adaptor activity
Cellular component	recycling endosome; cytosol; postsynaptic membrane; membrane; plasma membrane; synapse; cell junction; dendrite; endoplasmic reticulum; membrane raft; neuron projection; cytoplasmic vesicle; glutamatergic synapse
Biological process	protein localization; androgen receptor signaling pathway; intracellular signal transduction; dendrite development; positive regulation of transcription, DNA-templated; neurotransmitter receptor transport, endosome to postsynaptic membrane; vesicle-mediated transport in synapse; positive regulation of neuron projection arborization; positive regulation of signal transduction
Sources:Amigo / QuickGO
Orthologs
Databases	NCBI: entry; OMA: entry
Species	Human	Mouse
Entrez	23426	74053
Ensembl	ENSG00000155974	ENSMUSG00000034813
UniProt	Q9Y3R0	Q925T6
RefSeq (mRNA)	NM_001178074; NM_021150; NM_001366722; NM_001366723; NM_001366724 NM_001379345; NM_001379346; NM_001379347; NM_001379348; NM_001379349; NM_001379351	NM_001277292; NM_001277293; NM_001277294; NM_001277295; NM_028736 NM_130891; NM_133442; NM_001358809; NM_001358810; NM_001358811
RefSeq (protein)	NP_001171545; NP_066973; NP_001353651; NP_001353652; NP_001353653 NP_001366274; NP_001366275; NP_001366276; NP_001366277; NP_001366278; NP_001366280	NP_001264221; NP_001264222; NP_001264223; NP_001264224; NP_083012 NP_570961; NP_597699; NP_001345738; NP_001345739; NP_001345740
Location (UCSC)	Chr 12: 66.35 – 67.07 Mb	Chr 10: 119.29 – 119.92 Mb
PubMed search
- Wikidata
View/Edit Human	View/Edit Mouse

Glutamate receptor-interacting protein 1 is a protein that in humans is encoded by the GRIP1 gene.

== Interactions ==
GRIP1 (gene) has been shown to interact with:

- GRM3,
- GRIA2,
- GRIA3,
- GRIA4,
- GRIK2, and
- GRIK3.
