= BNC1 =

Protein-coding gene in the species Homo sapiens

Identifiers
- Aliases: BNC1, BNC, BSN1, HsT19447, basonuclin 1, POF16
- External IDs: OMIM: 601930; MGI: 1097164; GeneCards: BNC1

Gene location (Human)
Chr.	Chromosome 15 (human)
Band	15q25.2	Start	83,255,884 bp
Band	15q25.2	End	83,284,664 bp

Gene location (Mouse)
Chr.	Chromosome 7 (mouse)
Band	7|7 D3	Start	81,616,401 bp
Band	7|7 D3	End	81,642,055 bp
RNA expression pattern
Bgee	Human / Mouse (ortholog); Top expressed in: germinal epithelium; parietal pleura; gonad; hair follicle; gingival epithelium; secondary oocyte; left testis; testicle; right testis; skin of abdomen / Top expressed in: molar; primary oocyte; secondary oocyte; corneal stroma; zygote; hair follicle; endocardial cushion; abdominal wall; atrioventricular valve; trigeminal ganglion; More reference expression data
BioGPS	n/a
Gene ontology
Molecular function	DNA-binding transcription factor activity; metal ion binding; DNA binding; nucleic acid binding; DNA-binding transcription factor activity, RNA polymerase II-specific
Cellular component	cytoplasm; nucleus; nucleoplasm; intracellular membrane-bounded organelle
Biological process	regulation of transcription, DNA-templated; positive regulation of cell population proliferation; transcription, DNA-templated; epidermis development; spermatogenesis; cell differentiation; regulation of transcription by RNA polymerase II
Sources:Amigo / QuickGO
Orthologs
Databases	NCBI: entry; OMA: entry
Species	Human	Mouse
Entrez	646	12173
Ensembl	ENSG00000169594	ENSMUSG00000025105
UniProt	Q01954	O35914
RefSeq (mRNA)	NM_001301206; NM_001717	NM_007562
RefSeq (protein)	NP_001288135; NP_001708	NP_031588
Location (UCSC)	Chr 15: 83.26 – 83.28 Mb	Chr 7: 81.62 – 81.64 Mb
PubMed search
- Wikidata
View/Edit Human	View/Edit Mouse

Zinc finger protein basonuclin-1 is a protein that in humans is encoded by the BNC1 gene.

The protein encoded by this gene is a zinc finger protein present in the basal cell layer of the epidermis and in hair follicles. It is also found in abundance in the germ cells of testis and ovary. This protein is thought to play a regulatory role in keratinocyte proliferation and it may also be a regulator for rRNA transcription. This gene seems to have multiple alternatively spliced transcript variants, but their full-length nature is not known yet. There seems to be evidence of multiple polyadenylation sites for this gene.

BNC1 or Basonuclin 1 does not interact with PICK1. The suggestion that it does is based on the article that proved that PICK1 interacts with the non-voltage gated sodium channels BNC1 (brain Na^{+} channel 1). Both Basonuclin 1 and brain Na^{+} channel 1 have the same abbreviation BNC1, but they are not similar proteins and PICK1 interacts with the second protein, not the first one.
