= 4-Amino-2-methyl-1-naphthol =

Names
- Preferred IUPAC name 4-Amino-2-methylnaphthalen-1-ol

Identifiers
CAS Number	83-70-5; (HCl): 130-24-5
3D model (JSmol)	Interactive image
ChemSpider	6497
EC Number	204-983-9
PubChem CID	6754
UNII	KKP97T7O0X; (HCl): DJ4D3O924J
CompTox Dashboard (EPA)	DTXSID3075042
- InChI: InChI=1S/C11H11NO/c1-7-6-10(12)8-4-2-3-5-9(8)11(7)13/h2-6,13H,12H2,1H3 Key: UGQFCTZXVAPVCS-UHFFFAOYSA-N
- SMILES: CC1=C(C2=CC=CC=C2C(=C1)N)O

Properties
Chemical formula	C_{11}H_{11}NO
Molar mass	173.215 g·mol^{−1}
Appearance	HCl: white crystalline powder
Solubility	HCl: soluble in water, poorly soluble in ethanol, insoluble in diethyl ether
- Except where otherwise noted, data are given for materials in their standard state (at 25 °C [77 °F], 100 kPa). Infobox references

4-Amino-2-methyl-1-naphthol is a menadione analog. Its water-soluble hydrochloride (HCl) salt is often called vitamin K_{5}. The HCl salt has been used as a medicine for vitamin K deficiency under tradenames such as Synkamin, which was sold by Parke-Davis, but has since been discontinued.

Vitamin K function of the compound was first noted in 1940.

Oral lethal dose for the HCl salt in rats is 0.7 g/kg.

== Uses ==
4-Amino-2-methyl-1-naphthol HCl salt is a vitamin K and prevents bleeding caused by vitamin K deficiency when given via intravenous or intramuscular injections at doses of about 1–3 mg. HCl salt is water-soluble and its parenteral administration requires no emulsifiers unlike fat-soluble phylloquinone for example, which is often in formulations with lecithin or glycocholic acid. Parenterally given 1 mg/ml aqueous solutions and orally taken 4 mg tablets of the HCl salt have been available commercially.

== Chemistry ==
4-Amino-2-methyl-1-naphthol HCl salt has a mass of 209.57 g/mol. It darkens at 262 °C and decays without melting at 280–282 °C.

HCl salt breaks down in aqueous solutions via oxidation which is quite fast at neutral pH. First a pink and later a purple precipitant forms. The colored precipitant is (4-oxy-2-methylnaphtylimine)-2-methyl-1,4-naphthoquinone, which is a condensation reaction product of 4-amino-2-methyl-1-naphthol and menadione. Latter is formed via oxidation and deamination of 4-amino-2-methyl-1-naphthol.

4-Amino-2-methyl-1-naphthol can be made from 2-methylnaphthalene or menadione.

== Research ==
4-Amino-2-methyl-1-naphthol HCl salt prevents the growth of different molds and bacteria. Thus it has been studied as potential food preservative.

HCl salt has been studied as a potential treatment for cancer as it prevents glycolysis in cancer cells, which provides them energy for growth.
