= GRIK1 =

Protein-coding gene in the species Homo sapiens

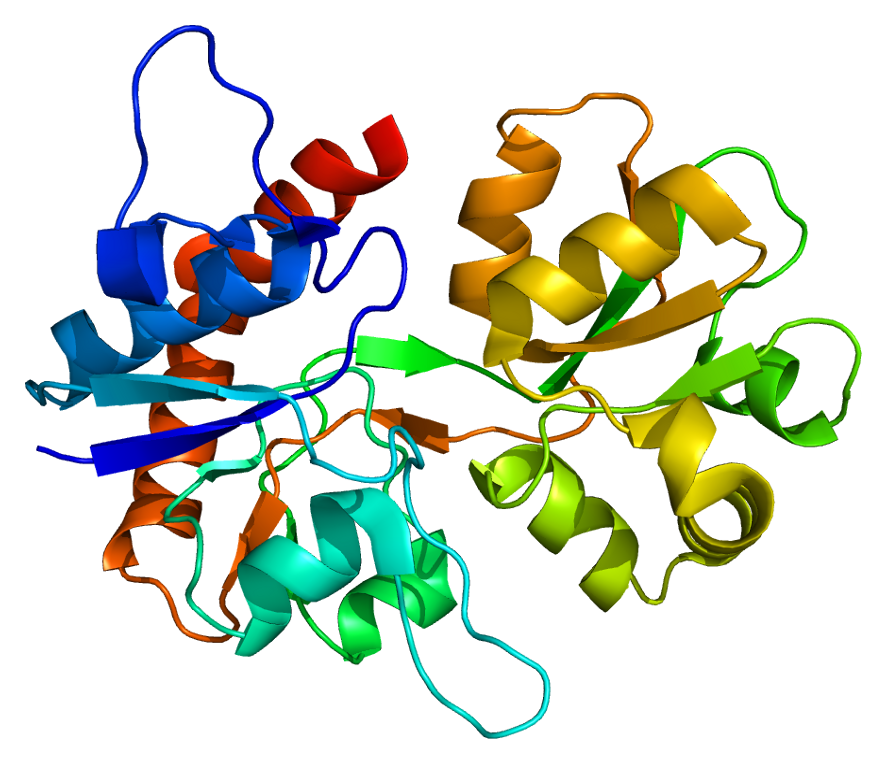

Identifiers
- Aliases: GRIK1, EAA3, EEA3, GLR5, GLUR5, GluK1, gluR-5, glutamate ionotropic receptor kainate type subunit 1
- External IDs: OMIM: 138245; MGI: 95814; GeneCards: GRIK1
Available structures
PDB	Ortholog search: PDBe RCSB
PDB	List of PDB id codes 2ZNS, 2ZNT, 2ZNU, 3FUZ, 3FV1, 3FV2, 3FVG, 3FVK, 3FVN, 3FVO, 4MF3

Gene location (Human)
Chr.	Chromosome 21 (human)
Band	21q21.3	Start	29,536,933 bp
Band	21q21.3	End	29,940,033 bp

Gene location (Mouse)
Chr.	Chromosome 16 (mouse)
Band	16 C3.3|16 50.23 cM	Start	87,692,788 bp
Band	16 C3.3|16 50.23 cM	End	88,087,153 bp
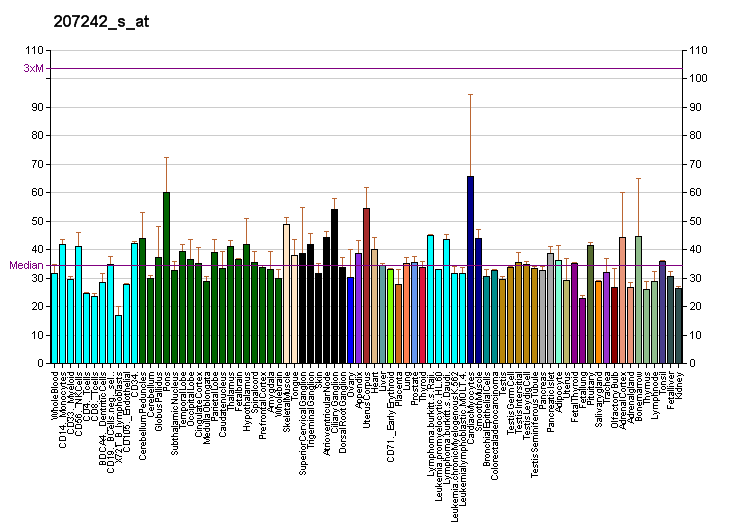

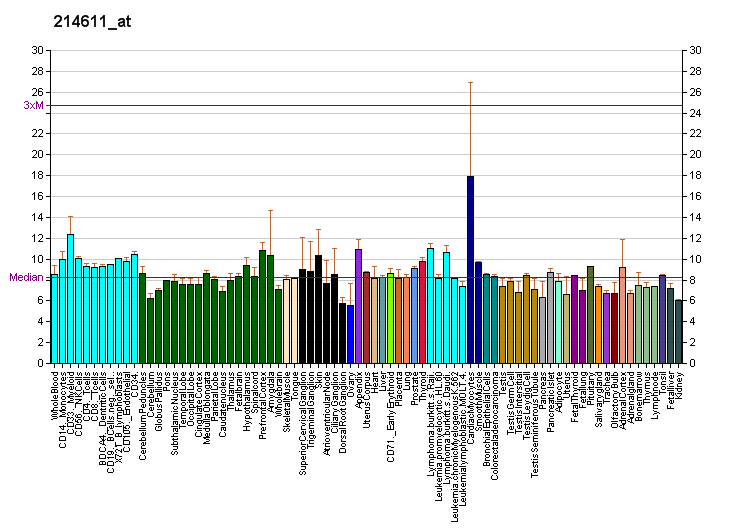
RNA expression pattern
Bgee	Human / Mouse (ortholog); Top expressed in: testicle; cingulate gyrus; anterior cingulate cortex; amygdala; prefrontal cortex; dorsolateral prefrontal cortex; frontal pole; paraflocculus of cerebellum; hypothalamus; right frontal lobe / Top expressed in: lumbar spinal ganglion; neural layer of retina; lateral hypothalamus; medial geniculate nucleus; suprachiasmatic nucleus; pontine nuclei; retinal pigment epithelium; anterior amygdaloid area; barrel cortex; lateral geniculate nucleus; More reference expression data
BioGPS	More reference expression data
Gene ontology
Molecular function	ion channel activity; kainate selective glutamate receptor activity; extracellularly glutamate-gated ion channel activity; ionotropic glutamate receptor activity; ligand-gated ion channel activity; signaling receptor activity; glutamate receptor activity; transmitter-gated ion channel activity involved in regulation of postsynaptic membrane potential
Cellular component	integral component of membrane; cell junction; plasma membrane; postsynaptic membrane; integral component of plasma membrane; synapse; membrane; kainate selective glutamate receptor complex; presynaptic membrane
Biological process	glutamate receptor signaling pathway; central nervous system development; ion transmembrane transport; regulation of synaptic transmission, glutamatergic; ion transport; nervous system development; chemical synaptic transmission; ionotropic glutamate receptor signaling pathway; excitatory postsynaptic potential; synaptic transmission, glutamatergic; modulation of chemical synaptic transmission; regulation of postsynaptic membrane potential
Sources:Amigo / QuickGO
Orthologs
Databases	NCBI: entry; OMA: entry
Species	Human	Mouse
Entrez	2897	14805
Ensembl	ENSG00000171189	ENSMUSG00000022935
UniProt	P39086	Q60934
RefSeq (mRNA)	NM_000830; NM_175611; NM_001320616; NM_001320618; NM_001320621 NM_001320630; NM_001330993; NM_001330994; NM_001393424; NM_001393425; NM_001393426	NM_010348; NM_146072; NM_001346964
RefSeq (protein)	NP_000821; NP_001307545; NP_001307547; NP_001307550; NP_001307559 NP_001317922; NP_001317923; NP_783300	n/a
Location (UCSC)	Chr 21: 29.54 – 29.94 Mb	Chr 16: 87.69 – 88.09 Mb
PubMed search
- Wikidata
View/Edit Human	View/Edit Mouse

Glutamate receptor, ionotropic, kainate 1, also known as GRIK1, is a protein that in humans is encoded by the GRIK1 gene.

== Function ==
This gene encodes one of the many ionotropic glutamate receptor (GluR) subunits that function as a ligand-gated ion channel. The specific GluR subunit encoded by this gene is of the kainate receptor subtype. Receptor assembly and intracellular trafficking of ionotropic glutamate receptors are regulated by RNA editing and alternative splicing. These receptors mediate excitatory neurotransmission and are critical for normal synaptic function. Two alternatively spliced transcript variants that encode different isoforms have been described. Exons of this gene are interspersed with exons from the C21orf41 gene, which is transcribed in the same orientation as this gene but does not seem to encode a protein.

== Interactions ==
GRIK1 has been shown to interact with DLG4, PICK1 and SDCBP.

== RNA editing ==
=== Type ===
A to I RNA editing is catalyzed by a family of adenosine deaminases acting on RNA (ADARs) that specifically recognize adenosines within double-stranded regions of pre-mRNAs and deaminate them to inosine. Inosines are recognised as guanosine by the cells translational machinery. There are three members of the ADAR family ADARs 1-3, with ADAR1 and ADAR2 being the only enzymatically active members. ADAR3 is thought to have a regulatory role in the brain. ADAR1 and ADAR2 are widely expressed in tissues, whereas ADAR3 is restricted to the brain. The double-stranded regions of RNA are formed by base-pairing between residues in the close to region of the editing site, with residues usually in a neighboring intron, but can be an exonic sequence. The region that base-pairs with the editing region is known as an Editing Complementary Sequence (ECS). ADARs bind interact directly with the dsRNA substrate via their double-stranded RNA binding domains. If an editing site occurs within a coding sequence, the result could be a codon change. This can lead to translation of a protein isoform due to a change in its primary protein structure. Therefore, editing can also alter protein function. A to I editing occurs in a noncoding RNA sequences such as introns, untranslated regions (UTRs), LINEs, SINEs( especially Alu repeats). The function of A to I editing in these regions is thought to involve creation of splice sites and retention of RNAs in the nucleus, among others.

=== Location ===
The pre-mRNA of GluR-5 is edited at one position at the Q/R site located at membrane region 2 (M2). There is a codon change as a result of editing. The codon change is (CAG) Glutamine (Q) to (CGG) an Arginine (R). Like GluR-6 the ECS is located about 2000 nucleotides downstream of the editing site.

=== Regulation ===
Editing of the Q/R site is development- and tissue-regulated. Editing in the spinal cord, corpus callosum, cerebellum is 50%, while editing in the Thalamus, amygdala, hippocampus is about 70%.

=== Consequences ===
==== Structure ====
Editing results in a change in amino acid in the second membrane domain of the receptor.

==== Function ====
The editing site is found within the second intracellular domain. It is thought that editing affects the permeability of the receptor to CA2+. Editing of the Q/R site is thought to reduce the permeability of the channel to Ca2+

RNA editing of the Q/R site can effect inhibition of the channel by membrane fatty acids such as arachidonic acid and docosahexaenoic acid For Kainate receptors with only edited isoforms, these are strongly inhibited by these fatty acids. However, inclusion of just one nonedited subunit is enough to stop this inhibition(.

== See also ==
- Kainate receptor
- GRIK1 RNA editing
