= 4-Amino-3-methyl-1-naphthol =

Names
- Preferred IUPAC name 4-Amino-3-methylnaphthalen-1-ol

Identifiers
CAS Number	83-69-2
3D model (JSmol)	Interactive image
ChemSpider	59895
ECHA InfoCard	100.001.360
EC Number	201-495-8
PubChem CID	66524
UNII	HEE4JPA7DF
CompTox Dashboard (EPA)	DTXSID10232113
- InChI: InChI=1S/C11H11NO/c1-7-6-10(13)8-4-2-3-5-9(8)11(7)12/h2-6,13H,12H2,1H3 Key: YJRCNAAPGQBVFS-UHFFFAOYSA-N
- SMILES: CC1=C(C2=CC=CC=C2C(=C1)O)N

Properties
Chemical formula	C_{11}H_{11}NO
Molar mass	173.215 g·mol^{−1}
Appearance	crystalline (HCl)
Melting point	270 °C HCl decays
Solubility in water	HCl is soluble
- Except where otherwise noted, data are given for materials in their standard state (at 25 °C [77 °F], 100 kPa). Infobox references

4-Amino-3-methyl-1-naphthol is a synthetic menadione analog. It is also known as vitamin K_{7}, and was named as such in 1950 when it was recognized as a compound with vitamin K activity.

It can be made from 2-methylnaphthalene or menadione. It forms a crystalline hydrochloride salt (C_{11}H_{11}NO·HCl) from hydrochloric acid. At least 1 g of the salt dissolves in 25 ml of water at 75 °C. The salt turns pink to dark violet on exposure to air and light.

4-Amino-3-methyl-1-naphthol or its hydrochloride have not been used as commercial medicinal forms of vitamin K unlike phylloquinone and menadione for example.
