= GRIA2 =

Mammalian protein found in Homo sapiens

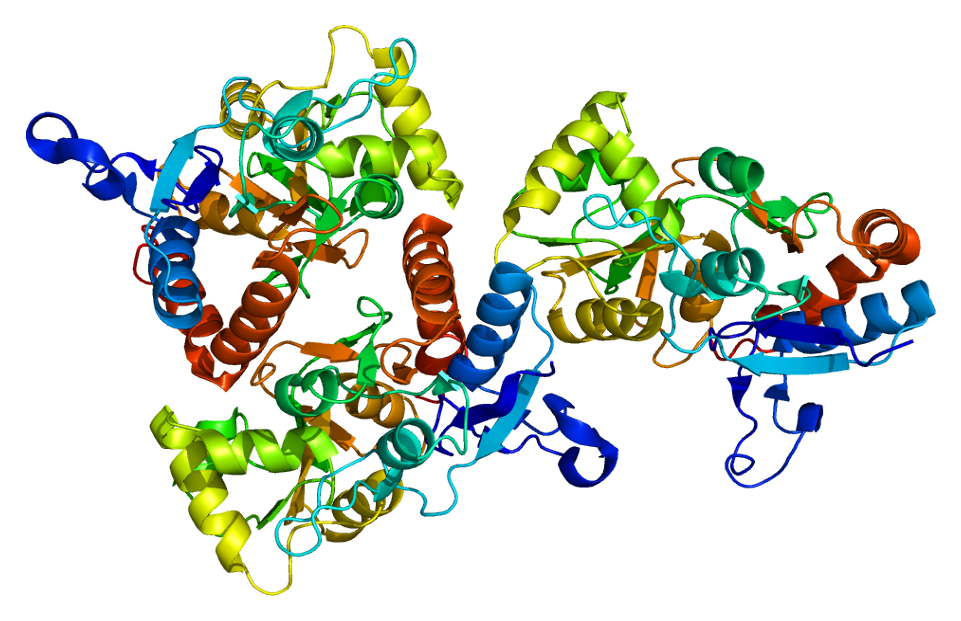

Identifiers
- Aliases: GRIA2, GLUR2, GLURB, GluA2, GluR-K2, HBGR2, glutamate ionotropic receptor AMPA type subunit 2, gluR-B, gluR-2, NEDLIB
- External IDs: OMIM: 138247; MGI: 95809; GeneCards: GRIA2
Available structures
| PDB | Ortholog search: PDBe RCSB |
| PDB | List of PDB id codes 2WJW, 2WJX, 2XHD, 3R7X, 3RN8, 3RNN, 3UA8, 5H8S |

Gene location (Human)
| Chr. | Chromosome 4 (human) |
| Band | 4q32.1 | Start | 157,204,182 bp |
| Band | 4q32.1 | End | 157,366,075 bp |

Gene location (Mouse)
| Chr. | Chromosome 3 (mouse) |
| Band | 3 E3|3 35.5 cM | Start | 80,588,757 bp |
| Band | 3 E3|3 35.5 cM | End | 80,710,142 bp |
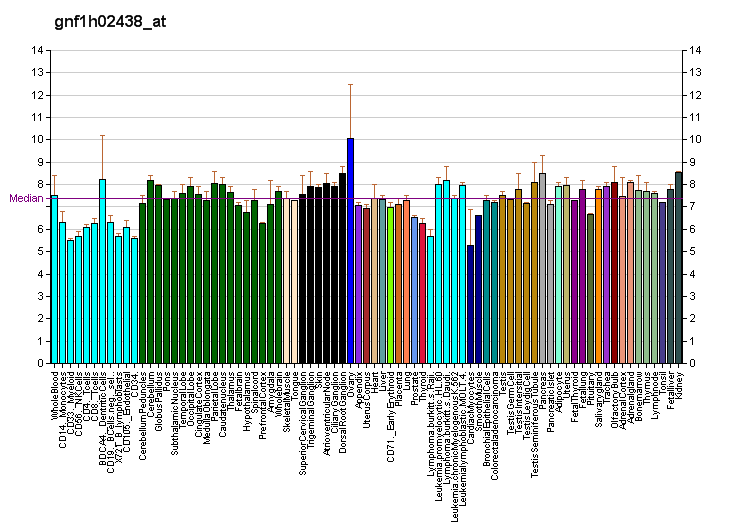

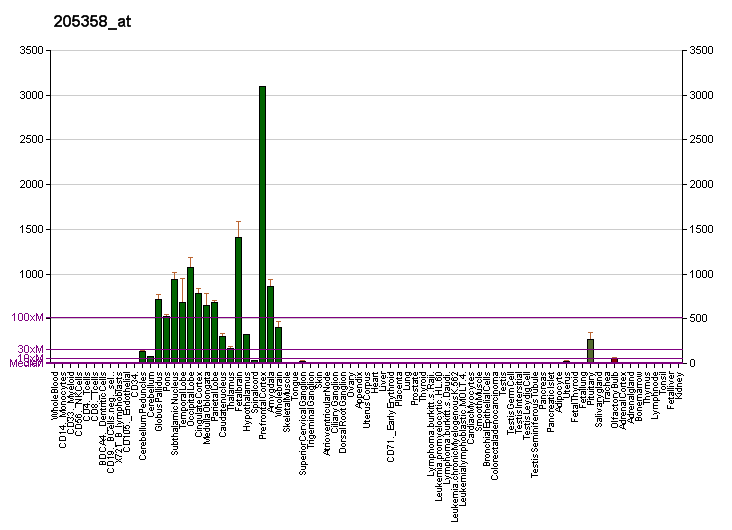

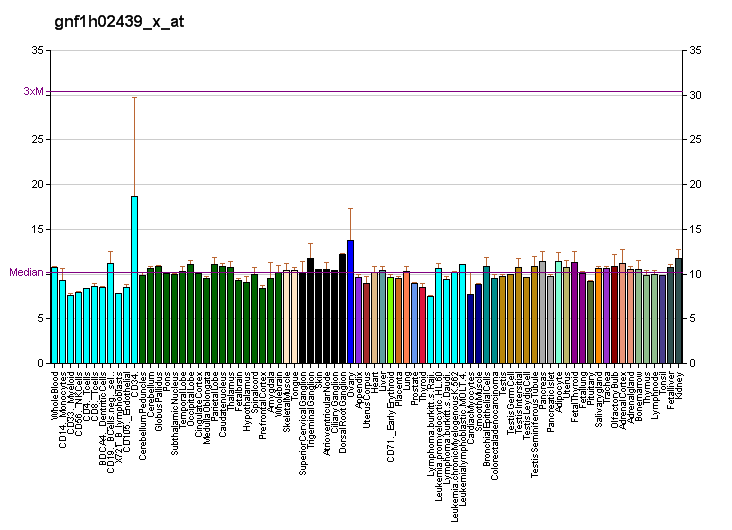
RNA expression pattern
| Bgee | Human / Mouse (ortholog); Top expressed in: frontal pole; Brodmann area 23; middle temporal gyrus; Brodmann area 10; Region I of hippocampus proper; orbitofrontal cortex; parietal lobe; postcentral gyrus; cerebellar vermis; entorhinal cortex / Top expressed in: lateral septal nucleus; CA3 field; anterior amygdaloid area; cingulate gyrus; subiculum; olfactory tubercle; entorhinal cortex; primary motor cortex; perirhinal cortex; ventromedial nucleus; More reference expression data |
| BioGPS | More reference expression data |
Gene ontology
| Molecular function | ion channel activity; protein binding; ionotropic glutamate receptor activity; extracellularly glutamate-gated ion channel activity; excitatory extracellular ligand-gated ion channel activity; AMPA glutamate receptor activity; amyloid-beta binding; signaling receptor activity |
| Cellular component | integral component of membrane; endocytic vesicle membrane; postsynaptic membrane; endoplasmic reticulum membrane; membrane; plasma membrane; synapse; integral component of plasma membrane; cell junction; endoplasmic reticulum; AMPA glutamate receptor complex; external side of plasma membrane; dendrite; dendritic spine; excitatory synapse; postsynapse; postsynaptic endocytic zone; postsynaptic density |
| Biological process | ion transport; ion transmembrane transport; ionotropic glutamate receptor signaling pathway; transport; signal transduction; chemical synaptic transmission; excitatory postsynaptic potential; synaptic transmission, glutamatergic; regulation of NMDA receptor activity |
Sources:Amigo / QuickGO
Orthologs
| Databases | NCBI: entry; OMA: entry |
| Species | Human | Mouse |
| Entrez | 2891 | 14800 |
| Ensembl | ENSG00000120251 | ENSMUSG00000033981 |
| UniProt | P42262 | P23819 |
| RefSeq (mRNA) | NM_000826; NM_001083619; NM_001083620; NM_001379000; NM_001379001 | NM_001039195; NM_001083806; NM_013540; NM_001357924; NM_001357927 |
| RefSeq (protein) | NP_000817; NP_001077088; NP_001077089; NP_001365929; NP_001365930 | NP_001034284; NP_001077275; NP_038568; NP_001344853; NP_001344856 |
| Location (UCSC) | Chr 4: 157.2 – 157.37 Mb | Chr 3: 80.59 – 80.71 Mb |
| PubMed search |
- Wikidata
| View/Edit Human | View/Edit Mouse |

Glutamate ionotropic receptor AMPA type subunit 2 (also known as glutamate receptor 2 or GluR-2) is a protein in humans that is encoded by the GRIA2 (also called GLUR2) gene. It functions as a subunit of AMPA receptors.

== Function ==
Glutamate receptors are the predominant excitatory neurotransmitter receptors in the mammalian brain and are activated in a variety of normal neurophysiologic processes. This gene product belongs to a family of glutamate receptors that are sensitive to alpha-amino-3-hydroxy-5-methyl-4-isoxazole propionate (AMPA), called AMPA receptors, and function as ligand-activated cation channels. These channels are assembled from a combination of 4 subunits, encoded by 4 genes (GRIA1-4). The subunit encoded by this gene (GRIA2) is subject to RNA editing which renders the receptor that it becomes part of impermeable to calcium ions (Ca^{2+}). Human and animal studies suggest that the RNA editing is essential for normal brain function, and defective RNA editing of this gene may be relevant to the etiology of amyotrophic lateral sclerosis (ALS). Alternative splicing, resulting in transcript variants encoding different isoforms, has been noted for this gene, which includes the generation of flip and flop isoforms that vary in their signal transduction properties.

== Interactions ==
GRIA2 has been shown to interact with SPTAN1, GRIP1 and PICK1.

== RNA editing ==
The mRNAs of several ion channels and neurotransmitter receptor serve as substrates for ADARs. These include five subunits of glutamate-gated ion channels, specifically the ionotropic AMPA receptor subunits (GluR2, GluR3, GluR4) and kainate receptor subunits (GluR5, GluR6). Glutamate-gated ion channels are composed of four subunits per channel, with each subunit contributing to the pore loop structure. This pore loop is structurally related to that found in K^{+} channels, such as the human K_{v}1.1 channel. The pre-mRNA of the human K_{v}1.1 channel is also subject to A-to-I RNA editing. Glutamate receptors are responsible for mediating fast excitatory neurotransmission in the brain. The diversity of these receptors is generated through both alternative RNA splicing and RNA editing, which modify the coding sequences of individual subunits. GluR2, which is encoded by the pre-mRNA of the GRIA2 gene, is a well-studied example of a subunit that undergoes RNA editing.

=== Type ===
The type of RNA editing that occurs in the pre-mRNA of GluR-2 is adenosine-to-inosine (A-to-I) editing. A-to-I RNA editing is catalyzed by a family of enzymes known as adenosine deaminases acting on RNA (ADARs), which specifically recognize adenosines within double-stranded regions of pre-mRNAs and convert them to inosine through deamination. Inosine is interpreted as guanosine by the cellular translational machinery.

There are three known members of the ADAR family: ADAR1, ADAR2, and ADAR3. Of these, only ADAR1 and ADAR2 are enzymatically active, while ADAR3 is believed to play a regulatory role, particularly in the brain. ADAR1 and ADAR2 are widely expressed across various tissues, whereas ADAR3 expression is restricted to the brain.

The double-stranded RNA (dsRNA) structures required for editing are typically formed through base-pairing between sequences near the editing site and complementary sequences, often located in a neighboring intron, although they can also be within exonic regions. The region that base-pairs with the editing site is referred to as the editing complementary sequence (ECS). ADARs bind to these dsRNA substrates via their double-stranded RNA-binding domains.

When an editing site is located within a coding region, A-to-I editing can result in a codon change, potentially altering the amino acid sequence of the resulting protein. This may lead to the production of a functionally distinct protein isoform. A-to-I editing also occurs in non-coding regions such as introns, untranslated regions (UTRs), and repetitive elements like LINEs and SINEs (especially Alu repeats). In these regions, editing may influence splicing, RNA stability, nuclear retention, and other aspects of RNA processing.

=== Location ===
In the pre-mRNA of GluR-2, the Q/R editing site is located at amino acid position 607. This site lies within the pore loop region, deep inside the ion channel formed by membrane segment 2 of the protein. Editing at this site changes the codon from glutamine (Q) to arginine (R), significantly altering the ion permeability properties of the receptor.

Another editing site, known as the R/G site, is located at amino acid position 764. Editing at this site results in a codon change from arginine (R) to glycine (G), which affects the kinetics of receptor desensitization and recovery.

All editing in glutamate receptor subunits occurs within double-stranded RNA (dsRNA) structures. These are formed through complementary base pairing between the exon region containing the editing site and an editing complementary sequence (ECS) located within a nearby intron.

=== Regulation ===
Editing occurs at the Q/R site at a frequency of 100% of GluR2 transcripts in the brain. It is the only known editing site to be edited at a frequency of 100%. However some striatal and cortical neurons are edited less frequently. This has been suggested as a reason for the higher level of excitotoxicity of these particular neurons. The R/G site is developmentally regulated, being largely unedited in the embryonic brain with levels rising after birth. (ref 53)

=== Consequences ===
==== Structure ====
Editing results in a codon change from a glutamine codon (CAG) to an arginine codon (CIG). Editing at R/G results in a codon change. The region of the editing site is known to be the region that controls divalent cation permeability. The other ionotropic AMPA glutamate receptors have a genomically encoded have a glutamine residue, while GluR2 has an arginine.

==== Function ====
RNA editing of the GluR-2 (GluR-B) pre-mRNA is the best-characterised example of A-to-I editing. Activated by L-Glutamate, a major excitatory neurotransmitter in vertebrates central nervous systems, it acts as an agonist at NMDA, AMPA, and kainate neurotransmitters.(103) Activation results in neuronal cation entry (CA2+), causing membrane depolarisation required for the process of excitatory neurotransmission. The calcium permeability of these receptor channels is required for many important events in the CNS, including long-term potentiation.(104) Since editing occurs in nearly 100% of transcripts and is necessary for life, it is often wondered why edited GluR-B is not genomically encoded instead of being derived by RNA editing. The answer is unknown.

RNA editing at the Q/R site is thought to alter the permeability of the channel rendering it impermeable to Ca^{2+}. The Q/R site also occurs in the Kainate receptors GluR5 and GluR6. Editing at the Q/R site determines the calcium permeability of the channel, with channels containing the edited form being less permeable to calcium. This differs from GluR6 where editing of the Q/R site may increase calcium permeability of the channel especially if the I/V and Y/C sites are also edited. Therefore, the main function of editing is therefore in regulation of electrophysiology of the channel.

Editing in some striatal and cortical neurons is more likely to be subject to excitotoxicity, thought to be due to less than 100% editing of these particular neurons. Editing also has several other function effects. Editing alters the maturation and assembly of the channel, with the unedited form having a tendency to tetramerize and then is transported to the synapse. However, the edited version is assembled as a monomer and resides mainly in the endoplasmic reticulum. The arginine residue in the pore loop of GluR-2 receptor is thought to belong to a retention signal for the endoplasmic reticulum. Therefore, editing - since it occurs at 100% frequency - inhibits the availability of the channel at the synapse. This process occurs before assembly of the channels, thereby preventing glur-2-forming homeric channels, which could interfere with synaptic signalling.

Editing also occurs at the R/G site. Editing at the R/G sites results in variation in the rate that the receptor recovers from desensitisation. Editing at these sites results in faster recovery time from desensitisation

==== Dysregulation ====
Amyotrophic Lateral Sclerosis

Many human and animal studies have determined that RNA editing of the Q/R site in GluR2 pre-mRNA is necessary for normal brain function. Defective editing has been linked to several conditions such as amyotrophic lateral sclerosis (ALS). ALS effects 1 in 2000 people, usually fatal in 1–5 years, with onset in the majority of cases being sporadic and minority being familial. With these conditions motor neurons degenerate leading to eventual paralysis and respiratory failure. Glutamate excitotoxicity is known to contribute to the spread of the sporadic condition. Glutamate levels are increased up 40%, suggesting that activation of glutamate receptors could be the reason for this causing increase Ca influx and then neuronal death. Since decrease nor loss of editing at Q/R site would lead to increase in calcium permeability. In diseased motor neurons editing levels of Glur 2 (62-100%) at this site was discovered to be reduced. Abnormal editing is thought to be specific for this condition, as editing levels have not been found to be decreased in spinal and bulbar muscular atrophy. Q/R editing is not the only mechanism involved, as editing occurs only in spinal motor neurons not in upper spinal neurons. Also, it is unknown whether editing dysregulation is involved in the initiation of the condition, or whether it occurs during pathogenesis.

Epilepsy

In mouse models, failure of editing leads to epileptic seizures and death within 3 weeks of birth. Why editing exists at this site instead of a genomically encoded arginine is unknown since nearly 100% of transcripts are edited.

Cancer

Decreased editing at the Q/R site is also found in some human brain tumors. Reduction of ADAR2 expression is thought to be associated with epileptic seizures in malignant glioma.

== Use in diagnostic immunochemistry ==
GRIA2 is a diagnostic immunochemical marker for solitary fibrous tumour (SFT), distinguishing it from most mimics. Among other CD34-positive tumours, GRIA2 is also expressed in dermatofibrosarcoma protuberans (DFSP); however, clinical and histologic features aid in their distinction. GRIA2 shows a limited distribution in other soft tissue tumours.

== See also ==
- AMPA receptor
