= ADARB2 =

Protein-coding gene in humans

Identifiers
- Aliases: ADARB2, ADAR3, RED2, adenosine deaminase, RNA specific B2 (inactive), adenosine deaminase RNA specific B2 (inactive)
- External IDs: OMIM: 602065; MGI: 2151118; GeneCards: ADARB2

Gene location (Human)
Chr.	Chromosome 10 (human)
Band	10p15.3	Start	1,177,313 bp
Band	10p15.3	End	1,737,525 bp

Gene location (Mouse)
Chr.	Chromosome 13 (mouse)
Band	13|13 A1	Start	8,252,902 bp
Band	13|13 A1	End	8,818,783 bp
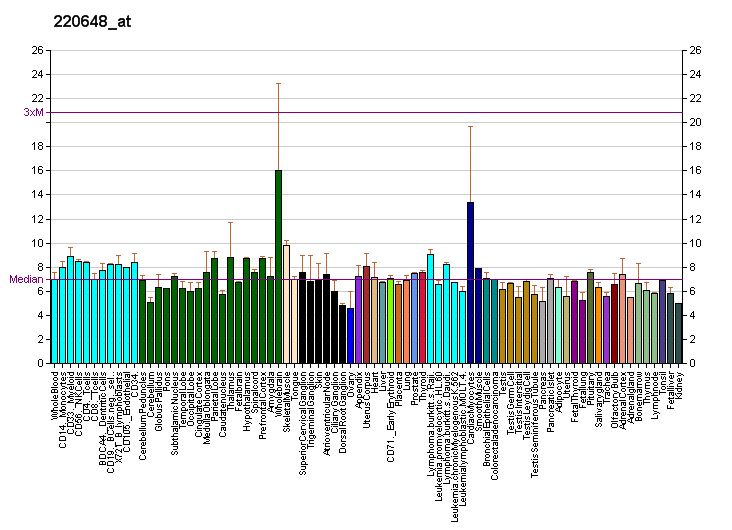
RNA expression pattern
Bgee	Human / Mouse (ortholog); Top expressed in: C1 segment; substantia nigra; amygdala; hippocampus proper; corpus callosum; putamen; prefrontal cortex; Brodmann area 9; anterior cingulate cortex; pons / Top expressed in: lateral geniculate nucleus; medial geniculate nucleus; substantia nigra; zygote; lumbar subsegment of spinal cord; medial dorsal nucleus; Rostral migratory stream; dentate gyrus of hippocampal formation granule cell; olfactory bulb; secondary oocyte; More reference expression data
BioGPS	More reference expression data
Gene ontology
Molecular function	double-stranded RNA binding; hydrolase activity; single-stranded RNA binding; metal ion binding; adenosine deaminase activity; RNA binding; double-stranded RNA adenosine deaminase activity; tRNA-specific adenosine deaminase activity
Cellular component	nucleus; nucleolus; cytoplasm
Biological process	mRNA processing; RNA processing; adenosine to inosine editing
Sources:Amigo / QuickGO
Orthologs
Databases	NCBI: entry; OMA: entry
Species	Human	Mouse
Entrez	105	94191
Ensembl	ENSG00000185736	ENSMUSG00000052551
UniProt	Q9NS39	Q9JI20
RefSeq (mRNA)	NM_018702	NM_001289530; NM_052977
RefSeq (protein)	NP_061172	NP_001276459; NP_443209
Location (UCSC)	Chr 10: 1.18 – 1.74 Mb	Chr 13: 8.25 – 8.82 Mb
PubMed search
- Wikidata
View/Edit Human	View/Edit Mouse

Double-stranded RNA-specific editase B2 is an enzyme that in humans is encoded by the ADARB2 gene.

== Function ==
RNA-editing deaminase-2 (RED2, or ADARB2) is a member of the double-stranded RNA (dsRNA) adenosine deaminase family of RNA-editing enzymes. Adenosine deamination of pre-mRNA results in a change in the amino acid sequence of the gene product, which differs from that predicted by the genomic DNA sequence. Other members of this family include DRADA (ADAR) and RED1 (ADARB1).

Unlike ADAR1 and ADAR2, ADAR3 has demonstrated no editing ability in vitro. It has been shown to suppress 5-HT2C RNA editing in vitro through a yet unknown mechanism, and may thus work as a negative regulator.
