= Deamination =

Removal of an amino group from a molecule

Deamination is the removal of an amino group from a molecule. Enzymes that catalyse this reaction are called deaminases.

In the human body, deamination takes place primarily in the liver; however, it can also occur in the kidney. In situations of excess protein intake, deamination is used to break down amino acids for energy. The amino group is removed from the amino acid and converted to ammonia. The rest of the amino acid is made up of mostly carbon and hydrogen, and is recycled or oxidized for energy. Ammonia is toxic to the human system, and enzymes convert it to urea or uric acid by addition of carbon dioxide molecules (which is not considered a deamination process) in the urea cycle, which also takes place in the liver. Urea and uric acid can safely diffuse into the blood and then be excreted in urine.

== Deamination reactions in DNA ==
=== Cytosine ===
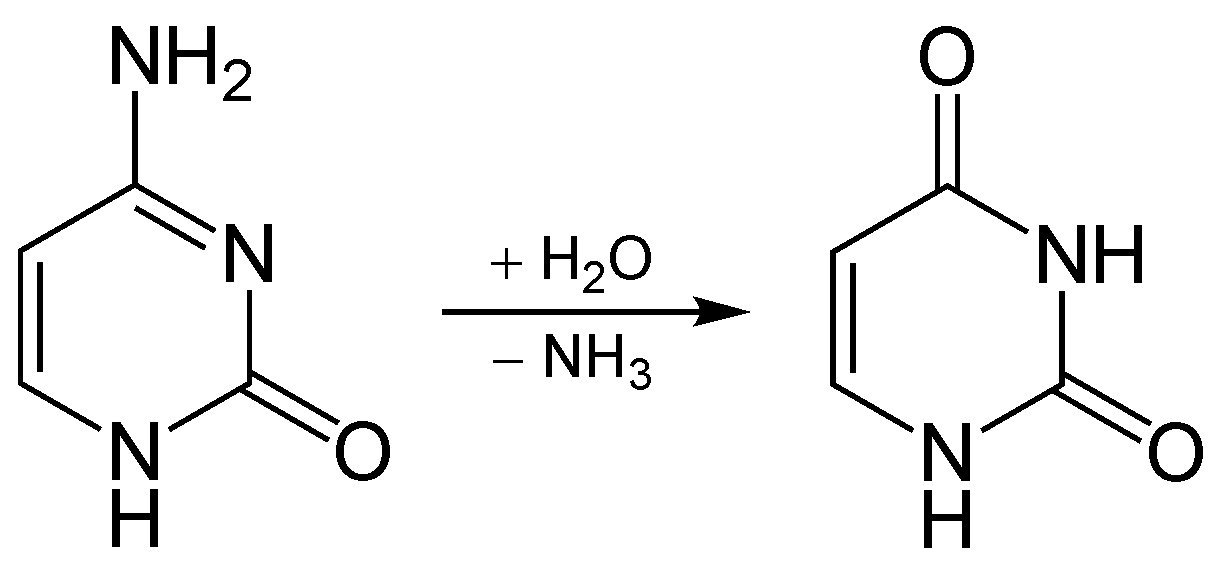
Deamination of cytosine to uracil.

Spontaneous deamination is the hydrolysis reaction of cytosine into uracil, releasing ammonia in the process. This can occur in vitro through the use of bisulfite, which deaminates cytosine, but not 5-methylcytosine. This property has allowed researchers to sequence methylated DNA to distinguish non-methylated cytosine (shown up as uracil) and methylated cytosine (unaltered).

In DNA, this spontaneous deamination is corrected for by the removal of uracil (product of cytosine deamination and not part of DNA) by uracil-DNA glycosylase, generating an abasic (AP) site. The resulting abasic site is then recognised by enzymes (AP endonucleases) that break a phosphodiester bond in the DNA, permitting the repair of the resulting lesion by replacement with another cytosine. A DNA polymerase may perform this replacement via nick translation, a terminal excision reaction by its 5'⟶3' exonuclease activity, followed by a fill-in reaction by its polymerase activity. DNA ligase then forms a phosphodiester bond to seal the resulting nicked duplex product, which now includes a new, correct cytosine (Base excision repair).

=== 5-methylcytosine ===
Spontaneous deamination of 5-methylcytosine results in thymine and ammonia. This is the most common single nucleotide mutation. In DNA, this reaction, if detected prior to passage of the replication fork, can be corrected by the enzyme thymine-DNA glycosylase, which removes the thymine base in a G/T mismatch. This leaves an abasic site that is repaired by AP endonucleases and polymerase, as with uracil-DNA glycosylase.

==== Cytosine deamination increases C-To-T mutations ====
A known result of cytosine methylation is the increase of C-to-T transition mutations through the process of deamination. Cytosine deamination can alter the genome's many regulatory functions; previously silenced transposable elements (TEs) may become transcriptionally active due to the loss of CPG sites. TEs have been proposed to accelerate the mechanism of enhancer creation by providing extra DNA that is compatible with the host transcription factors that eventually have an impact on C-to-T mutations.

=== Guanine ===
Deamination of guanine results in the formation of xanthine. Xanthine, however, still pairs with cytosine.

=== Adenine ===
Deamination of adenine results in the formation of hypoxanthine. Hypoxanthine, in a manner analogous to the imine tautomer of adenine, selectively base pairs with cytosine instead of thymine. This results in a post-replicative transition mutation, where the original A-T base pair transforms into a G-C base pair.

== Additional proteins performing this function ==
- APOBEC1
- APOBEC3A-H, APOBEC3G - affects HIV
- Activation-induced cytidine deaminase (AICDA)
- Cytidine deaminase (CDA)
- dCMP deaminase (DCTD)
- AMP deaminase (AMPD1)
- Adenosine Deaminase acting on tRNA (ADAT)
- Adenosine Deaminase acting on dsRNA (ADAR)
  - Double-stranded RNA-specific editase 1 (ADARB1)
- Adenosine Deaminase acting on mononucleotides (ADA)
- Guanine Deaminase (GDA)

== See also ==
- Adenosine monophosphate deaminase deficiency type 1
- Hofmann elimination
