= ADARB1 =

Protein-coding gene in humans

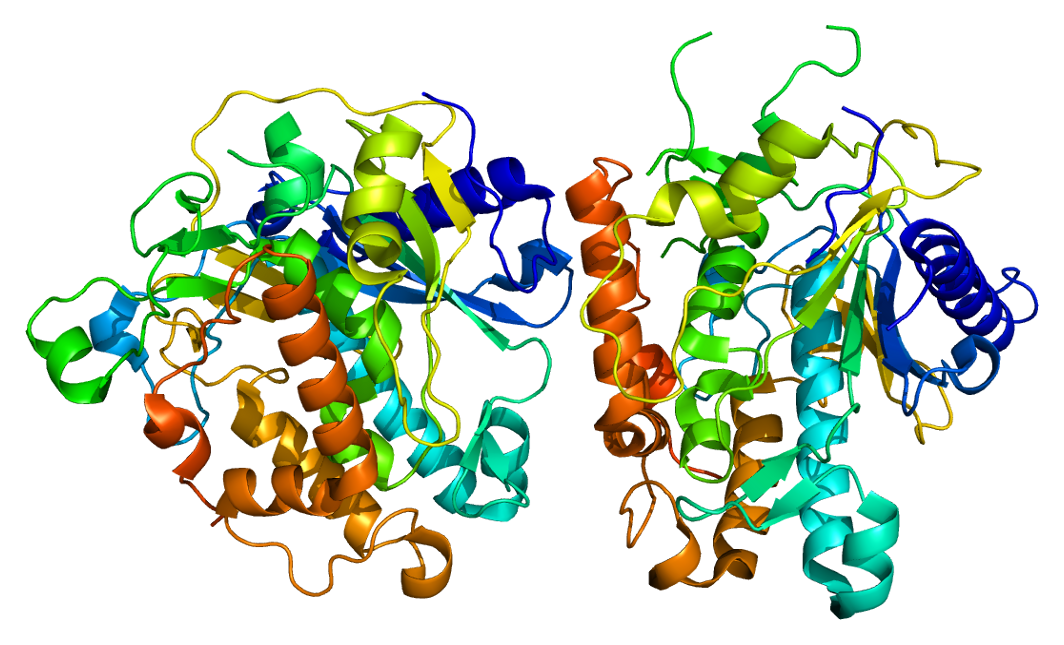

Identifiers
- Aliases: ADARB1, ADAR2, DRABA2, DRADA2, RED1, adenosine deaminase, RNA specific B1, adenosine deaminase RNA specific B1, NEDHYMS
- External IDs: OMIM: 601218; MGI: 891999; GeneCards: ADARB1
Available structures
| PDB | Ortholog search: PDBe RCSB |
| PDB | List of PDB id codes 1ZY7, 5ED1, 5ED2, 5HP3, 5HP2 |
Enzyme activity
| EC # | BRENDA | ExPASy | KEGG | MetaCyc |
|---|---|---|---|---|
| 3.5.4.37 | ↗ | ↗ | ↗ | ↗ |

Gene location (Human)
| Chr. | Chromosome 21 (human) |
| Band | 21q22.3 | Start | 45,073,853 bp |
| Band | 21q22.3 | End | 45,226,560 bp |

Gene location (Mouse)
| Chr. | Chromosome 10 (mouse) |
| Band | 10 C1|10 39.72 cM | Start | 77,126,560 bp |
| Band | 10 C1|10 39.72 cM | End | 77,254,104 bp |
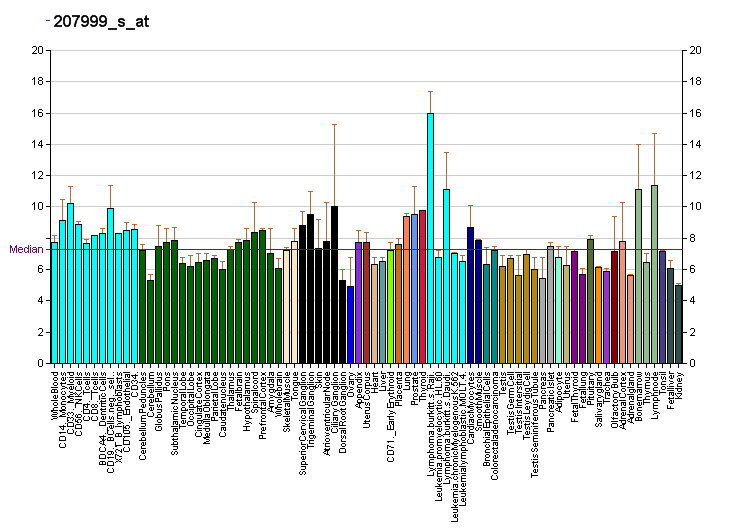
RNA expression pattern
| Bgee | Human / Mouse (ortholog); Top expressed in: tibial arteries; gastric mucosa; right coronary artery; cerebellar vermis; saphenous vein; lateral nuclear group of thalamus; Descending thoracic aorta; ascending aorta; Achilles tendon; left coronary artery / Top expressed in: medial dorsal nucleus; medial geniculate nucleus; lateral geniculate nucleus; inferior colliculi; cerebellar cortex; medulla oblongata; nucleus of stria terminalis; dentate gyrus of hippocampal formation granule cell; pontine nuclei; visual cortex; More reference expression data |
| BioGPS | More reference expression data |
Gene ontology
| Molecular function | metal ion binding; adenosine deaminase activity; protein binding; RNA binding; double-stranded RNA binding; mRNA binding; hydrolase activity; double-stranded RNA adenosine deaminase activity; tRNA-specific adenosine deaminase activity |
| Cellular component | nucleoplasm; nucleolus; nucleus; cytosol; cytoplasm |
| Biological process | RNA processing; immune system process; mRNA processing; base conversion or substitution editing; regulation of cell cycle; negative regulation of cell migration; defense response to virus; negative regulation of protein kinase activity by regulation of protein phosphorylation; positive regulation of viral genome replication; innate immune response; adenosine to inosine editing; negative regulation of cell population proliferation; neuromuscular synaptic transmission; facial nerve morphogenesis; hypoglossal nerve morphogenesis; spinal cord ventral commissure morphogenesis; multicellular organism growth; neuromuscular process controlling posture; innervation; muscle tissue morphogenesis; motor behavior; motor neuron apoptotic process |
Sources:Amigo / QuickGO
Orthologs
| Databases | NCBI: entry; OMA: entry |
| Species | Human | Mouse |
| Entrez | 104 | 110532 |
| Ensembl | ENSG00000197381 | ENSMUSG00000020262 |
| UniProt | P78563 | Q91ZS8 |
| RefSeq (mRNA) | NM_001033049; NM_001112; NM_001160230; NM_015833; NM_015834 NM_001346687; NM_001346688 | NM_001024837; NM_001024838; NM_001024839; NM_001024840; NM_130895 |
| RefSeq (protein) | NP_001103; NP_001153702; NP_001333616; NP_001333617; NP_056648 NP_056649 | NP_001020008; NP_570965; NP_001020009 |
| Location (UCSC) | Chr 21: 45.07 – 45.23 Mb | Chr 10: 77.13 – 77.25 Mb |
| PubMed search |
- Wikidata
| View/Edit Human | View/Edit Mouse |

Double-stranded RNA-specific editase 1 is an enzyme that in humans is encoded by the ADARB1 gene. The enzyme is a member of ADAR family.

== Function ==
This gene encodes the enzyme responsible for pre-mRNA editing of the glutamate receptor subunit B by site-specific deamination of adenosines. Studies in rats found that this enzyme acted on its own pre-mRNA molecules to convert an AA dinucleotide to an AI dinucleotide which resulted in a new splice site. Alternative splicing of this gene results in several transcript variants, some of which have been characterized by the presence or absence of an Alu cassette insert and a short or long C-terminal region.

ADARB1 requires the small molecule inositol hexakisphosphate (IP_{6}) for proper function. ADARB1 is an A-to-I RNA-editing enzyme that mostly acts on protein-coding substrates.

== See also ==
- Adenosine deaminase (ADA), an enzyme acting on isolated adenosine
