= Inosine =

Chemical compound

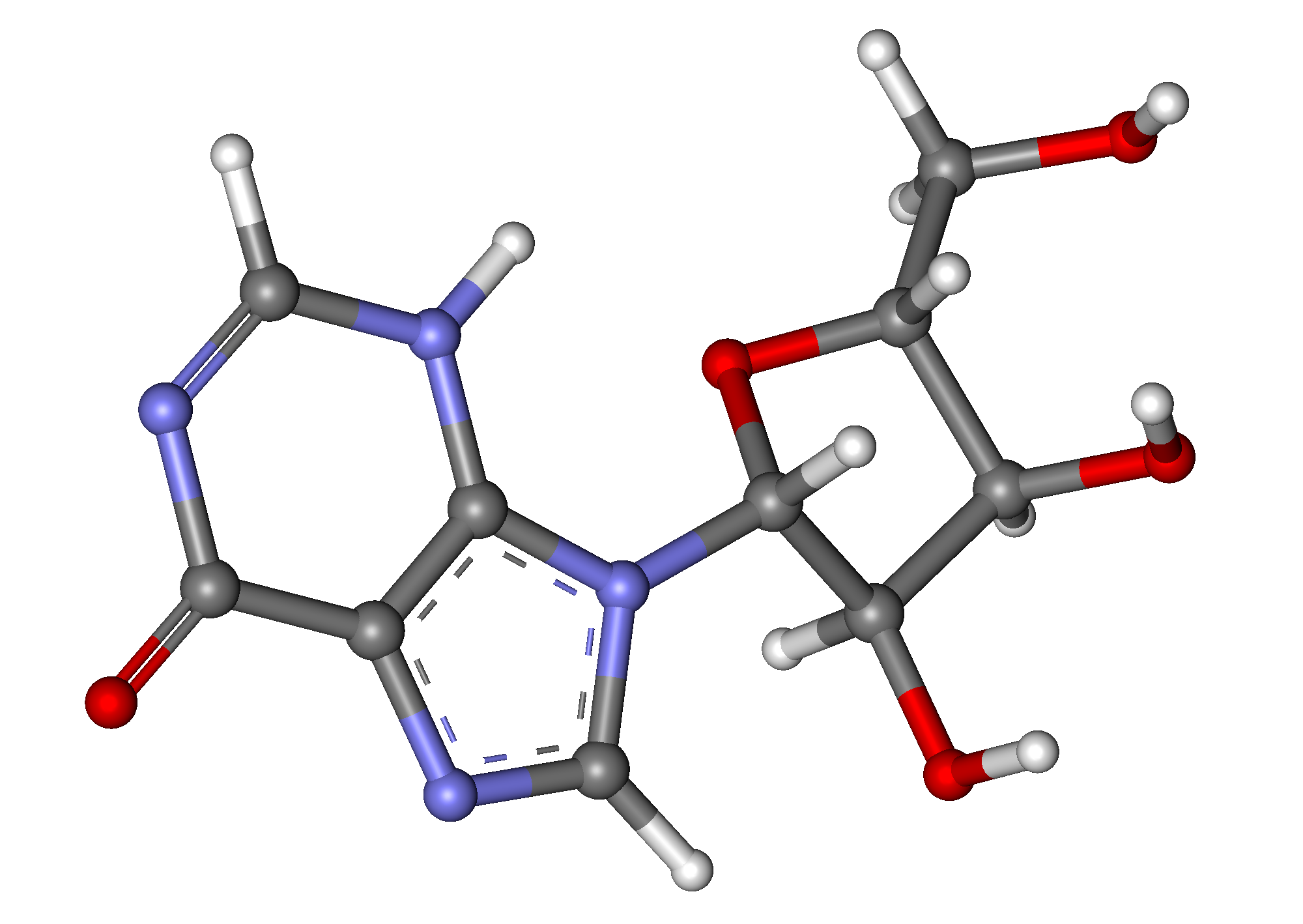

Clinical data
- AHFS/Drugs.com: International Drug Names
- ATC code: D06BB05 (WHO) G01AX02 (WHO) S01XA10 (WHO)

Legal status
- Legal status: In general: Over-the-counter (OTC)

Pharmacokinetic data
- Metabolism: Hepatic

Identifiers
- IUPAC name: 9-[(2R,3R,4S,5R)-3,4-dihydroxy-5-(hydroxymethyl)oxolan-2-yl]-6,9-dihydro-3H-purin-6-one
- CAS Number: 58-63-9
- PubChem CID: 6021
- IUPHAR/BPS: 4554
- DrugBank: DB04335
- ChemSpider: 5799
- UNII: 5A614L51CT
- KEGG: C00294
- ChEBI: CHEBI:17596
- ChEMBL: ChEMBL1556
- CompTox Dashboard (EPA): DTXSID2045993
- ECHA InfoCard: 100.000.355

Chemical and physical data
- Formula: C_{10}H_{12}N_{4}O_{5}
- Molar mass: 268.229 g·mol^{−1}
- 3D model (JSmol): Interactive image
- SMILES: c1[nH]c2c(c(=O)n1)ncn2[C@H]3[C@@H]([C@@H]([C@H](O3)CO)O)O
- InChI: InChI=1S/C10H12N4O5/c15-1-4-6(16)7(17)10(19-4)14-3-13-5-8(14)11-2-12-9(5)18/h2-4,6-7,10,15-17H,1H2,(H,11,12,18)/t4-,6-,7-,10-/m1/s1; Key:UGQMRVRMYYASKQ-KQYNXXCUSA-N

Inosine is a nucleoside that is formed when hypoxanthine is attached to a ribose ring (also known as a ribofuranose) via a β-N^{9}-glycosidic bond. It was discovered in 1965 in analysis of RNA transferase. Inosine is commonly found in tRNAs and is essential for proper translation of the genetic code in wobble base pairs.

Wobble base pairs for inosine and guanine

Knowledge of inosine metabolism has led to advances in immunotherapy in recent decades. Inosine monophosphate is oxidised by the enzyme inosine monophosphate dehydrogenase, yielding xanthosine monophosphate, a key precursor in purine metabolism. Mycophenolate mofetil is an anti-metabolite, anti-proliferative drug that acts as an inhibitor of inosine monophosphate dehydrogenase. It is used in the treatment of a variety of autoimmune diseases including granulomatosis with polyangiitis because the uptake of purine by actively dividing B cells can exceed 8 times that of normal body cells, and, therefore, this set of white cells (which cannot operate purine salvage pathways) is selectively targeted by the purine deficiency resulting from inosine monophosphate dehydrogenase (IMD) inhibition.

== Reactions ==
Adenine is converted to adenosine or inosine monophosphate (IMP), either of which, in turn, is converted into inosine (I), which pairs with adenine (A), cytosine (C), and uracil (U).

Purine nucleoside phosphorylase intraconverts inosine and hypoxanthine.

Inosine is also an intermediate in a chain of purine nucleotide reactions required for muscle movements.

== Clinical significance ==
Subsequent studies in humans suggest that inosine supplementation has no effect on athletic performance. Animal studies have suggested that inosine has neuroprotective properties. It has been proposed for spinal cord injury and for administration after stroke, because observation suggests that inosine induces axonal rewiring.

After ingestion, inosine is metabolized into uric acid, which has been suggested to be a natural antioxidant and peroxynitrite scavenger with potential benefits to patients with multiple sclerosis (MS). Peroxynitrite has been correlated with axon degeneration In 2003, a study was initiated at the University of Pennsylvania MS Center to determine whether raising the levels of uric acid by the administration of inosine would slow the progression of MS. The study was completed in 2006 but the results were not reported to NIH. A subsequent publication hinted at potential benefits but the sample size (16 patients) was too small for a definitive conclusion. In addition, the side effect of the treatment was the development of kidney stones in four of 16 patients.

With phase II trials for Parkinson's disease completed, inosine will continue to phase III trials. Earlier trials suggested that patients with the highest serum urate levels had slower progression of Parkinson's symptoms. The trial uses inosine to raise urate levels in those with levels lower than the population mean (6 mg/dL).

Alseres Pharmaceuticals (named Boston Life Sciences when patent was granted) patented the use of inosine to treat stroke and was investigating the drug in the MS setting.

In the Anatomical Therapeutic Chemical Classification System, it is classified as an antiviral.

== Binding ==
Inosine is a natural ligand for the benzodiazepine binding site on the GABA A receptor.

== Biotechnology ==
When designing primers for polymerase chain reaction, inosine is useful in that it can pair with any natural base. This allows for design of primers that span a single-nucleotide polymorphism, without the polymorphism disrupting the primer's annealing efficiency.

However, inosine pairs preferentially with cytosine (C) and its introduction to RNA, e.g. by the action of ADARs, thereby destabilizes double-stranded RNA by changing AU base-pairs to IU mismatches.

== Fitness ==
Despite lack of clinical evidence that it improves muscle development, inosine remains an ingredient in some fitness supplements.

== Feeding stimulant ==
Inosine has also been found to be an important feed stimulant by itself or in combination with certain amino acids in some species of farmed fish. For example, inosine and inosine 5-monophosphate have been reported as specific feeding stimulants for turbot fry, (Scophthalmus maximus) and Japanese amberjack, (Seriola quinqueradiata). The main problem of using inosine and/or inosine-5-monophosphate as feeding attractants is their high cost. However, their use may be economically justified within larval feeds for marine fish larvae during the early weaning period, since the total quantity of feed consumed is relatively small.

== See also ==
- Inosine monophosphate dehydrogenase
- Inosine pranobex
- Nucleobase
