= ADAR =

Mammalian protein found in humans

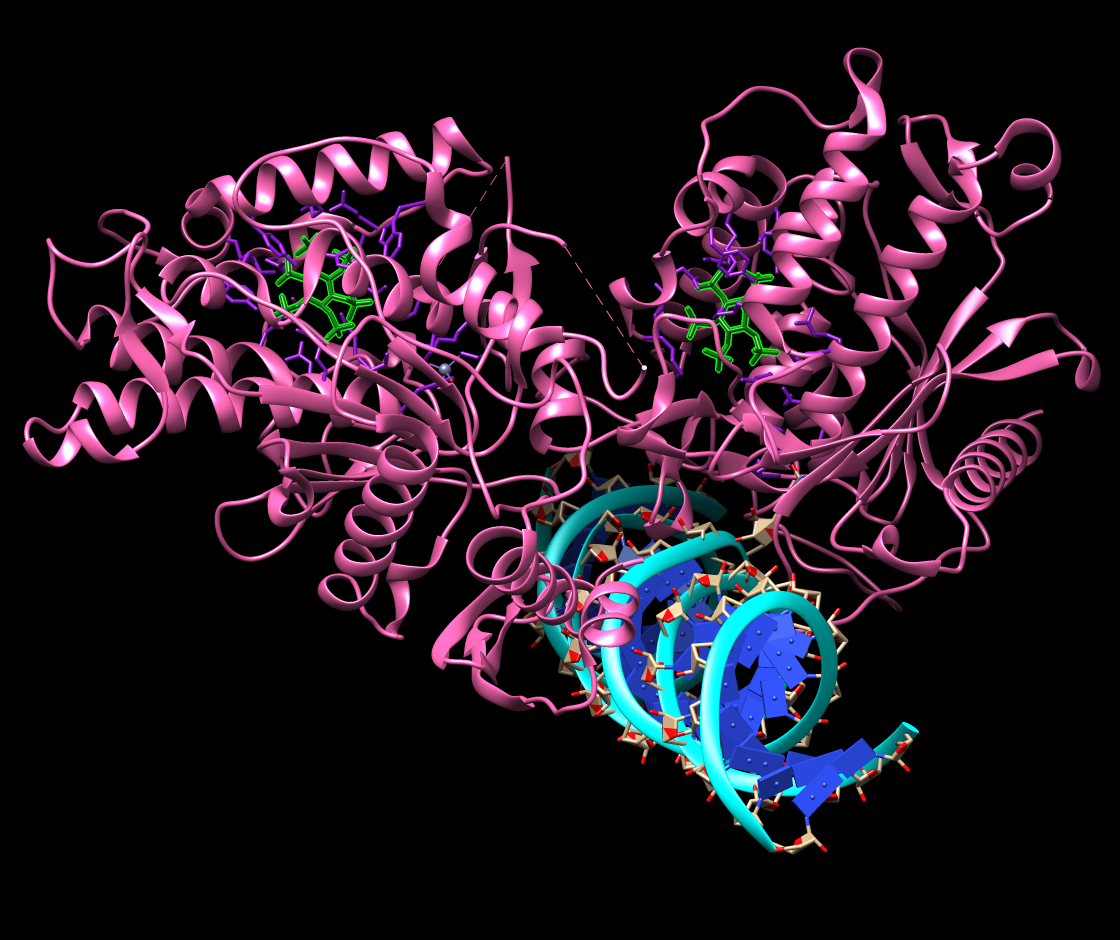
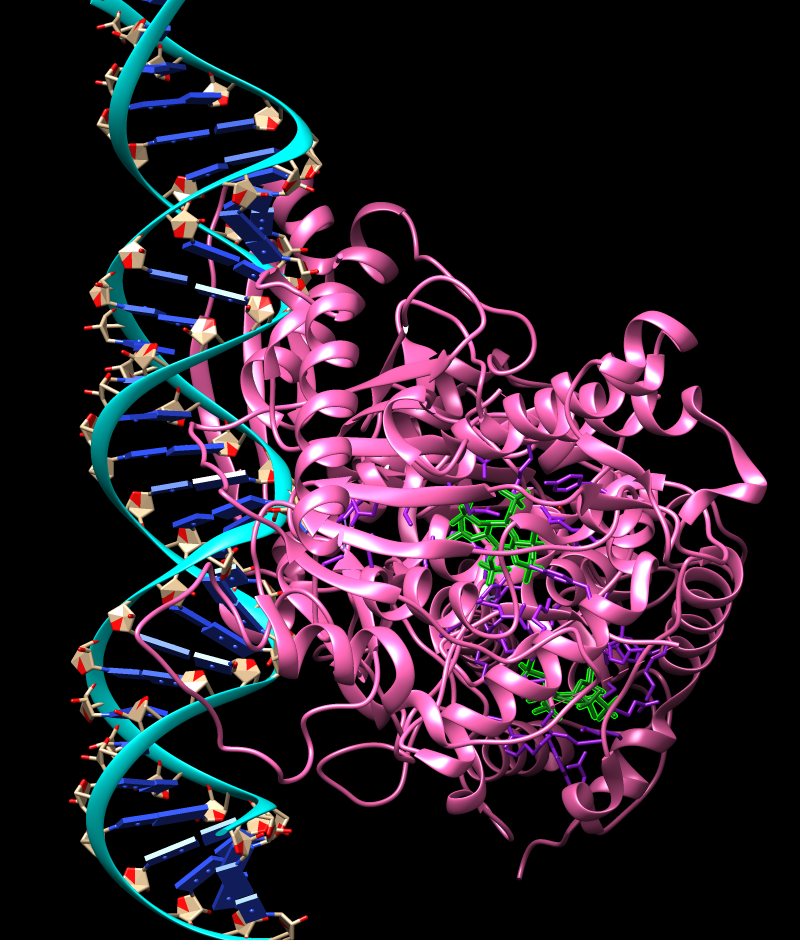
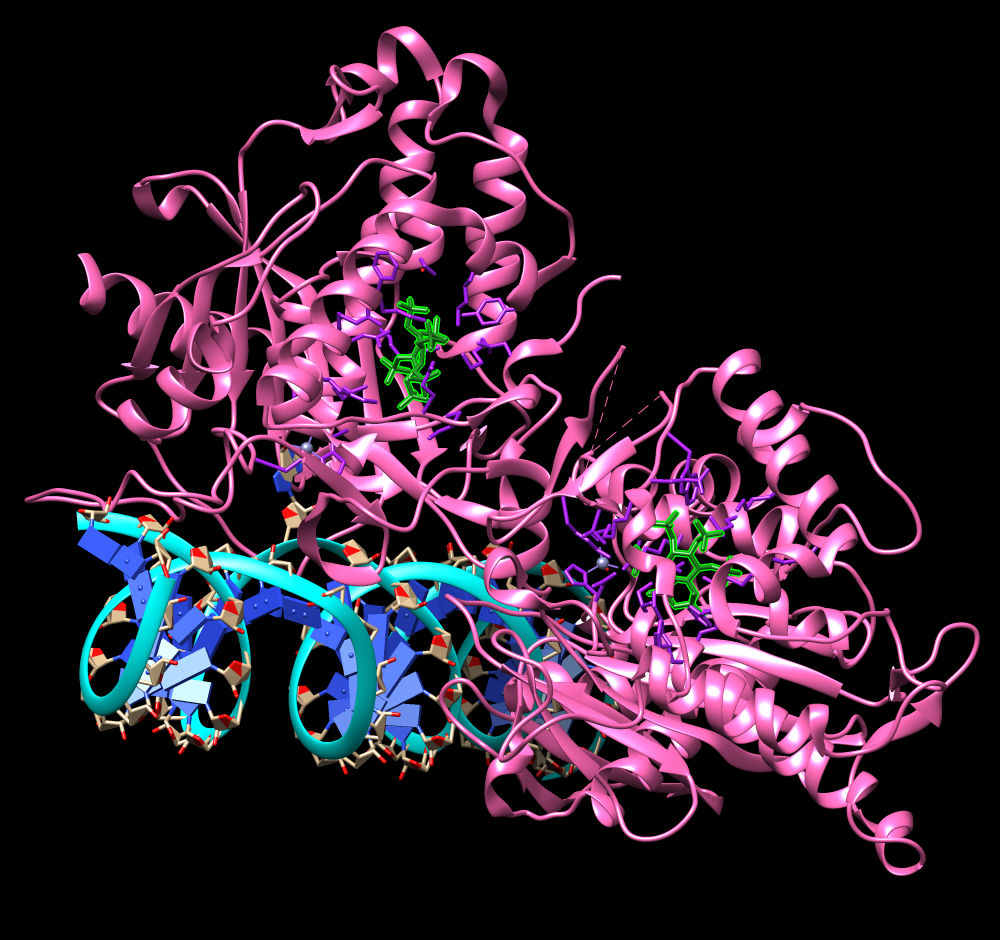

Identifiers
- Aliases: ADAR, ADAR1, ADAR2, ADAR3, ADARB1, ADARB2, ADAR1p150, ADAR1p110, IFI-4, DSH, P136, adenosine deaminase RNA specific, DRADA, IFI4, AGS6, G1P1, K88DSRBP, DSRAD
- External IDs: OMIM: 146920; MGI: 1889575; GeneCards: ADAR
Available structures
PDB	Ortholog search: PDBe RCSB
PDB	List of PDB id codes 1QBJ, 1QGP, 1XMK, 2ACJ, 2GXB, 2L54, 2MDR, 3F21, 3F22, 3F23, 3IRQ, 3IRR
Enzyme activity
EC #	BRENDA	ExPASy	KEGG	MetaCyc
3.5.4.37	↗	↗	↗	↗

Gene location (Human)
Chr.	Chromosome 1 (human)
Band	1q21.3	Start	154,581,695 bp
Band	1q21.3	End	154,628,013 bp

Gene location (Mouse)
Chr.	Chromosome 3 (mouse)
Band	3|3 F1	Start	89,622,329 bp
Band	3|3 F1	End	89,660,753 bp
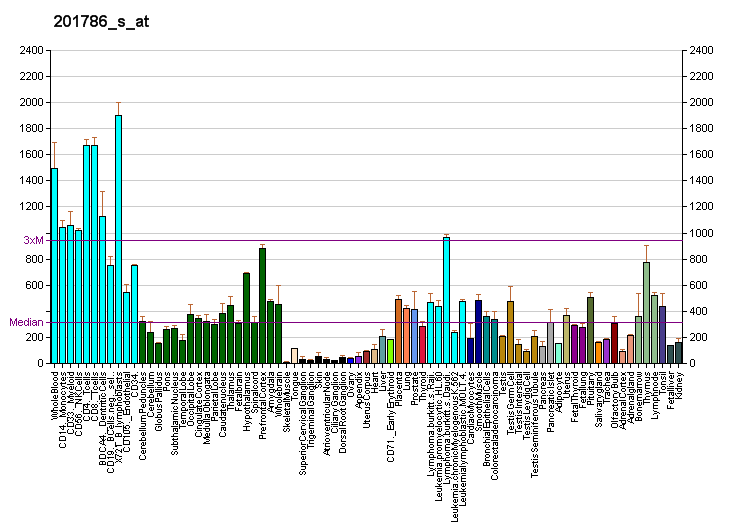
RNA expression pattern
Bgee	Human / Mouse (ortholog); Top expressed in: endothelial cell; middle temporal gyrus; middle frontal gyrus; visceral pleura; parietal pleura; palpebral conjunctiva; thymus; paraflocculus of cerebellum; internal globus pallidus; Brodmann area 23 / Top expressed in: dorsal tegmental nucleus; paraventricular nucleus of hypothalamus; dorsomedial hypothalamic nucleus; ventral tegmental area; lateral hypothalamus; ventromedial nucleus; subiculum; anterior amygdaloid area; mammillary body; arcuate nucleus; More reference expression data
BioGPS	More reference expression data
Gene ontology
Molecular function	DNA binding; metal ion binding; double-stranded RNA adenosine deaminase activity; adenosine deaminase activity; protein binding; hydrolase activity; RNA binding; double-stranded RNA binding; tRNA-specific adenosine deaminase activity
Cellular component	cytoplasm; membrane; supraspliceosomal complex; nucleoplasm; nucleolus; nucleus
Biological process	hematopoietic stem cell homeostasis; cellular response to virus; RNA processing; protein import into nucleus; immune system process; negative regulation of type I interferon-mediated signaling pathway; mRNA processing; response to virus; base conversion or substitution editing; negative regulation of apoptotic process; in utero embryonic development; pre-miRNA processing; negative regulation of viral genome replication; defense response to virus; type I interferon signaling pathway; osteoblast differentiation; hematopoietic progenitor cell differentiation; protein export from nucleus; response to interferon-alpha; negative regulation of protein kinase activity by regulation of protein phosphorylation; erythrocyte differentiation; somatic diversification of immune receptors via somatic mutation; definitive hemopoiesis; positive regulation of viral genome replication; negative regulation of RNA interference; gene silencing; innate immune response; adenosine to inosine editing; production of miRNAs involved in gene silencing by miRNA
Sources:Amigo / QuickGO
Orthologs
Databases	NCBI: entry; OMA: entry
Species	Human	Mouse
Entrez	103	56417
Ensembl	ENSG00000160710	ENSMUSG00000027951
UniProt	P55265	Q99MU3
RefSeq (mRNA)	NM_001025107; NM_001111; NM_001193495; NM_015840; NM_015841 NM_001365045; NM_001365046; NM_001365047; NM_001365048; NM_001365049	NM_001038587; NM_001146296; NM_019655; NM_001357958
RefSeq (protein)	NP_001020278; NP_001102; NP_001180424; NP_056655; NP_056656	NP_001033676; NP_001139768; NP_062629; NP_001344887
Location (UCSC)	Chr 1: 154.58 – 154.63 Mb	Chr 3: 89.62 – 89.66 Mb
PubMed search
- Wikidata
View/Edit Human	View/Edit Mouse

The double-stranded RNA-specific adenosine deaminase enzyme family are encoded by the ADAR family genes. ADAR stands for adenosine deaminase acting on RNA. This article focuses on the ADAR proteins; This article details the evolutionary history, structure, function, mechanisms and importance of all proteins within this family.

ADAR enzymes bind to double-stranded RNA (dsRNA) and convert adenosine to inosine (hypoxanthine) by deamination. ADAR proteins act post-transcriptionally, changing the nucleotide content of RNA. The conversion from adenosine to inosine (A to I) in the RNA disrupts the normal A:U pairing, destabilizing the RNA. Inosine is structurally similar to guanine (G) which leads to inosine to cytosine (I:C) binding. Inosine typically mimics guanosine during translation but can also bind to uracil and adenosine, though it is not favored.

Codon changes may arise from RNA editing leading to changes in the coding sequences for proteins and their functions. Most editing sites are found in noncoding regions of RNA such as untranslated regions (UTRs), Alu elements, and long interspersed nuclear elements (LINEs). Codon changes can give rise to alternate transcriptional splice variants. ADAR impacts the transcriptome in editing-independent ways, likely by interfering with other RNA-binding proteins.

Dysregulation of ADAR is associated with several diseases. Recent research supports a linkage between RNA-editing and nervous system disorders such as amyotrophic lateral sclerosis (ALS). Atypical RNA editing linked to ADAR may also correlate to mental disorders such as schizophrenia, epilepsy, and suicidal depression.

== Discovery ==
The ADAR enzyme and its associated gene were discovered accidentally in 1987 as a result of research by Brenda Bass and Harold Weintraub. These researchers were using antisense RNA inhibition to determine which genes play a key role in the development of Xenopus laevis embryos. Previous research on Xenopus oocytes was successful. However, when Bass and Weintraub applied identical protocols to Xenopus embryos, they were unable to determine the embryo's developmental genes. To understand why the method was unsuccessful, they began comparing duplex RNA in both oocytes and embryos. This led them to discover a developmentally regulated activity that denatures RNA:RNA hybrids in embryos.

In 1988, Richard Wagner et al. further studied the activity occurring on Xenopus embryos. They determined a protein was responsible for unwinding of RNA due to the absence of activity after proteinase treatment. This protein is specific for dsRNA and does not require ATP. It became evident this protein's activity on dsRNA modifies it beyond a point of rehybridization but does not fully denature it. Finally, the researchers determined this unwinding is due to the deamination of adenosine residues to inosine. This modification results in mismatched base-pairing between inosine and uridine, leading to the destabilization and unwinding of dsRNA.

== Evolution and function ==
ADARs are one of the most common forms of RNA editing, and have both selective and non-selective activity. ADAR is able to modify and regulate the output of gene product, as inosine is interpreted by the cell to be guanosine. ADAR can change the functionality of small RNA molecules. Recently, ADARs have also been discovered as a regulator on splicing and circRNA biogenesis with their editing capability or RNA binding function. It is believed that ADAR evolved from ADAT (Adenosine Deaminase Acting on tRNA), a critical protein present in all eukaryotes, early in the metazoan period through the addition of a dsRNA binding domain. This likely occurred in the lineage which leads to the crown Metazoa. When a duplicate ADAT gene was coupled to another gene which encoded at least one double stranded RNA binding. The ADAR family of genes has been largely conserved over the history of its existence. This, along with its presence in the majority of modern phyla, indicates that RNA editing is essential in regulating genes for metazoan organisms. ADAR has not been discovered in a variety of non-metazoan eukaryotes, such as plants, fungi and choanoflagellates.

ADARs are suggested to have two functions: to increase diversity of the proteome by inducing creation of harmless non-genomically encoded proteins, and protecting crucial translational sites. The conventional belief is their primary role is to increase the diversity of transcripts and expand the protein variation, promoting evolution of proteins.

== Forms of ADAR enzymes ==
In mammals, there are three types of ADAR enzymes: ADAR (ADAR1), ADARB1 (ADAR2), and ADARB2 (ADAR3).

=== ADAR (ADAR1) and ADAR2 (ADARB1) ===
ADAR one and two are both found within various tissues of the body. These two forms of ADAR are also found to be catalytically active, meaning they can be used as a catalyst in a reaction. Both forms also have similar expression pattern structures of proteins and require substrate double-stranded RNA structures. However, they differ in their editing activity in that both ADAR one and two can edit GluR-B pre-mRNA at the R/G site and only ADAR2 can alter the Q/R site. ADAR1 has been found two have two isoforms, ADAR1p150 and ADARp110. ADAR1p110 is typically found in the nucleus, while ADAR1p150 shuffles between the nucleus and the cytoplasm, mostly present in the cytoplasm.

=== ADAR3 (ADARB2) ===
ADAR 3 varies from the other two forms of ADAR in that it is only found within brain tissue. It also is considered to be inactive when it comes to catalytic activity. ADAR3 has been found to be linked to memory and learning in mice, showing that it plays a crucial role in the nervous system. In vitro studies have also shown that ADAR3 might play a role in the regulation of ADAR one and two.

== Catalytic activity ==
=== Biochemical reaction ===
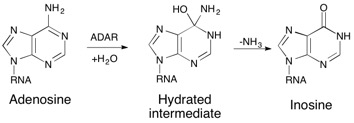
Adenosine conversion to Inosine via ADAR

ADARs catalyze the hydrolytic deamination reaction from adenosine to inosine. An activated water molecule will react with adenosine in a nucleophilic substitution reaction with the carbon-6 amine group. A hydrated intermediate will exist for a short period of time, then the amine group will leave as an ammonia ion.

=== Active site ===
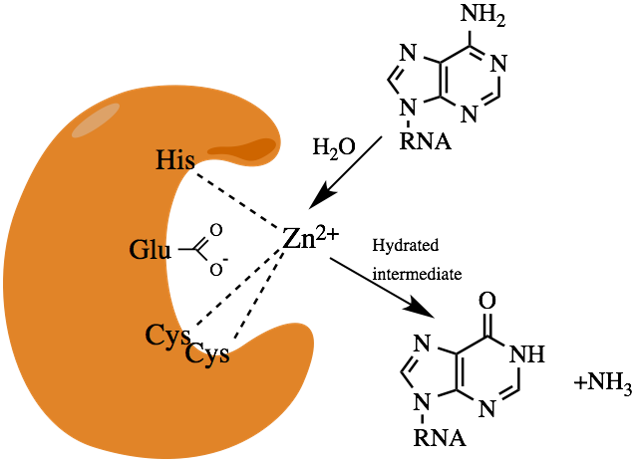
ADAR1 active site

In humans, ADAR enzymes have two to three amino-terminal dsRNA binding domains (dsRBDs), and one carboxy terminal catalytic deaminase domain. In the dsRBD there is a conserved α-β-β-β-α configuration. ADAR1 contains two areas for binding Z-DNA known as Zα and Zβ. ADAR2 and ADAR3 have an arginine rich single stranded RNA (ssRNA) binding domain. A crystal structure of ADAR2 has been solved. In the enzyme active site, there is a glutamic acid residue(E396) that hydrogen bonds to a water. A histidine (H394) and two cysteine residues (C451 and C516) coordinate with a zinc ion. The zinc activates the water molecule for the nucleophilic hydrolytic deamination. Within the catalytic core there is an inositol hexakisphosphate (IP6), which stabilizes arginine and lysine residues.

=== Dimerization ===
ADAR1 and ADAR2 have been shown to form homodimers in mammals, while ADAR3 does not. Earlier studies suggested that dimerization might be necessary for enzymatic activity and could occur independently of RNA binding, based on experiments with ADAR mutants that failed to bind double-stranded RNA (dsRNA) but could still dimerize, indicating protein-protein interactions were sufficient. However, more recent research has clarified that dimerization is not strictly required for ADAR1 enzymatic activity. A recent study demonstrated that ADAR1 dimerization occurs specifically through its third double-stranded RNA-binding domain (dsRBD3), and importantly, this dimerization is RNA-independent. This shows that ADAR1 can form dimers via a defined protein-protein interface without involving RNA. In addition, dimerization disruption do not completely abrogate ADAR1 editing activity, but affects editing efficiency differently depending on the selected editing site.

== Role in disease ==
=== Aicardi–Goutières syndrome and bilateral striatal necrosis/dystonia ===
ADAR1 is one of multiple genes which often contribute to Aicardi–Goutières syndrome when mutated. Aicardi–Goutières syndrome is a genetic inflammatory disease primarily affecting the skin and the brain and it is characterized by high levels of IFN-α in cerebral spinal fluid. The inflammation is caused by incorrect activation of interferon inducible genes such as those activated to fight off viral infections. Mutation and loss of function of ADAR1 prevents destabilization of double stranded RNA (dsRNA). This buildup of dsRNA stimulates IFN production without a viral infection, causing an inflammatory reaction and autoimmune response. The phenotype in the knock-out mice is rescued by the p150 form of ADAR1 containing the Zα domain that binds specifically to the left-handed double-stranded conformation found in Z-DNA and Z-RNA, but not by the p110 isoform lacking this domain. In humans, the P193A mutation in the Zα domain is causal for Aicardi–Goutières syndrome and for the more severe phenotype found in Bilateral Striatal Necrosis/Dystonia. The findings establish a biological role for the left-handed Z-DNA conformation.

=== Amyotrophic Lateral Sclerosis (ALS) ===
In motor neurons, the most well-grounded marker of amyotrophic lateral sclerosis (ALS) is the TAR DNA-binding protein (TDP-43). When there is failure of RNA-editing due to downregulation of TDP-43, motor neurons devoid of ADAR2 enzymes express unregulated, leading to abnormally permeable Ca^{2+} channels. ADAR2 knockout mice show signs of ALS phenotype similarity. Current researchers are developing a molecular targeting therapy by normalizing expression of ADAR2.

=== Cancer ===
(ADAR)-induced A-to-I RNA editing may elicit dangerous amino acid mutations. Editing mRNA typically imparts missense mutations leading to alterations in the beginning and terminating regions of translation. However, crucial amino acid changes can occur, resulting in change of function of several cellular processes. Amino acid changes can result in protein structural changes at secondary, tertiary, and quaternary structures. Researchers observed high levels of oncogenetic A-to-I editing in circular RNA precursors, directly confirming ADAR's relationship to cancer. A list of tumor related RNA editing sites can be found here.

==== Hepatocellular carcinoma ====
Studies of patients with hepatocellular carcinoma (HCC) have shown trends of upregulated ADAR1 and downregulated ADAR2. Results suggest the irregular regulation is responsible for the disrupted A to I editing pattern seen in HCC and that ADAR1 acts as an oncogene in this context whilst ADAR2 has tumor suppressor activities. The imbalance in ADAR expression could change the frequency of A to I transitions in the protein coding region of genes, resulting in mutated proteins which drive the disease. The dysregulation of ADAR1 and ADAR2 could be used as a possible prognostic marker.

==== Melanoma ====
Studies have indicated that loss of ADAR1 contributes to melanoma growth and metastasis. ADAR enzymes can act on microRNA and affect its biogenesis, stability and/or its binding target. ADAR1 may be downregulated by cAMP- response element binding protein (CREB), limiting its ability to act on miRNA. One such example is miR-455-5p which is edited by ADAR1. When ADAR is downregulated by CREB the unedited miR-455-5p downregulates a tumor suppressor protein called CPEB1, contributing to melanoma progression in an in vivo model.

=== Dyschromatosis symmetrica hereditaria (DSH1) ===
A Gly1007Arg mutation in ADAR1, as well as other truncated versions, have been implicated as a cause in some cases of DSH1. This is a disease characterized by hyperpigmentation in the hands and feet and can occur in Japanese and Chinese families.

=== HIV ===
Expression levels of the ADAR1 protein have shown to be elevated during HIV infection and it has been suggested that it is responsible for A to G mutations in the HIV genome, inhibiting replication. The mutation in the HIV genome by ADAR1 might in some cases lead to beneficial viral mutations which could contribute to drug resistance.

== Viral activity ==
=== Antiviral ===
ADAR1 is an interferon ( IFN )-inducible protein (one released by a cell in response to a pathogen or virus), able to assist in a cell's immune pathway. Evidence shows elimination of HCV replicon, Lymphocytic choriomeningitis LCMV, and polyomavirus.

=== Proviral ===
ADAR1 is proviral in other circumstances. ADAR1's A to I editing has been found in many viruses including measles virus, influenza virus, lymphocytic choriomeningitis virus, polyomavirus, hepatitis delta virus, and hepatitis C virus. Although ADAR1 has been seen in other viruses, it has only been studied extensively in a few. Research on measles virus shows ADAR1 enhancing viral replication through two different mechanisms: RNA editing and inhibition of dsRNA-activated protein kinase (PKR). Specifically, viruses are thought to use ADAR1 as a positive replication factor by selectively suppressing dsRNA-dependent and antiviral pathways.

== See also ==
- RNA editing
- Potassium channel RNA editing signal
- ADARB1
- Z-DNA
