= Metabotropic glutamate receptor 8 =

Mammalian protein found in humans

GRM8

Identifiers
- Aliases: GRM8, GLUR8, GPRC1H, MGLUR8, mGlu8, glutamate metabotropic receptor 8
- External IDs: OMIM: 601116; MGI: 1351345; HomoloGene: 654; GeneCards: GRM8; OMA:GRM8 - orthologs

Gene location (Human)
Chr.	Chromosome 7 (human)
Band	7q31.33	Start	126,438,598 bp
Band	7q31.33	End	127,253,093 bp

Gene location (Mouse)
Chr.	Chromosome 6 (mouse)
Band	6|6 A3.1- A3.2	Start	27,275,118 bp
Band	6|6 A3.1- A3.2	End	28,135,177 bp
RNA expression pattern
Bgee	Human / Mouse (ortholog); Top expressed in: gonad; testicle; left testis; right testis; oocyte; Epithelium of choroid plexus; prefrontal cortex; Brodmann area 9; corpus callosum; cingulate gyrus / Top expressed in: ganglion cell layer; secondary oocyte; zygote; inner nuclear layer; superior frontal gyrus; embryo; primary visual cortex; embryo; outer nuclear layer; dentate gyrus of hippocampal formation granule cell; More reference expression data
BioGPS	n/a
Gene ontology
Molecular function	glutamate receptor activity; G protein-coupled receptor activity; signal transducer activity
Cellular component	integral component of membrane; integral component of plasma membrane; presynaptic membrane; membrane; plasma membrane
Biological process	adenylate cyclase-inhibiting G protein-coupled glutamate receptor signaling pathway; signal transduction; visual perception; response to stimulus; regulation of synaptic transmission, glutamatergic; G protein-coupled receptor signaling pathway; adenylate cyclase-inhibiting G protein-coupled receptor signaling pathway; G protein-coupled glutamate receptor signaling pathway
Sources:Amigo / QuickGO
Orthologs
Species	Human	Mouse
Entrez	2918	14823
Ensembl	ENSG00000179603	ENSMUSG00000024211
UniProt	O00222	P47743
RefSeq (mRNA)	NM_000845; NM_001127323; NM_001371083; NM_001371084; NM_001371085 NM_001371086; NM_001371087; NM_001371088	NM_008174; NM_001311072; NM_001361125
RefSeq (protein)	NP_000836; NP_001120795; NP_001358012; NP_001358013; NP_001358014 NP_001358015; NP_001358016; NP_001358017	NP_001298001; NP_032200; NP_001348054
Location (UCSC)	Chr 7: 126.44 – 127.25 Mb	Chr 6: 27.28 – 28.14 Mb
PubMed search
- Wikidata
View/Edit Human	View/Edit Mouse

Metabotropic glutamate receptor 8 is a protein that in humans is encoded by the GRM8 gene.

== Function ==
L-glutamate is the major excitatory neurotransmitter in the central nervous system and activates both ionotropic and metabotropic glutamate receptors. Glutamatergic neurotransmission is involved in most aspects of normal brain function and can be perturbed in many neuropathologic conditions. The metabotropic glutamate receptors are a family of G protein-coupled receptors, that have been divided into 3 groups on the basis of sequence homology, putative signal transduction mechanisms, and pharmacologic properties. Group I includes GRM1 and GRM5 and these receptors have been shown to activate phospholipase C. Group II includes GRM2 and GRM3 while Group III includes GRM4, GRM6, GRM7 and GRM8. Group II and III receptors are linked to the inhibition of the cyclic AMP cascade but differ in their agonist selectivities. Alternative splice variants of GRM8 have been described but their full-length nature has not been determined.

== Ligands ==
- (S)-3,4-DCPG: agonist
- AZ12216052: positive allosteric modulator

== See also ==
- Metabotropic glutamate receptor
