= LY-379,268 =

Chemical compound

Identifiers
- IUPAC name: (1S,2R,5R,6R)-2-amino-4-oxabicyclo[3.1.0]hexane-2,6-dicarboxylic acid
- CAS Number: 191471-52-0
- PubChem CID: 10197984
- ChemSpider: 8373484
- UNII: S96JF4J697
- ChEBI: CHEBI:192545
- CompTox Dashboard (EPA): DTXSID90436637

Chemical and physical data
- Formula: C_{7}H_{9}NO_{5}
- Molar mass: 187.151 g·mol^{−1}
- 3D model (JSmol): Interactive image
- SMILES: C1[C@]([C@@H]2[C@H]([C@@H]2O1)C(=O)O)(C(=O)O)N
- InChI: InChI=1S/C7H9NO5/c8-7(6(11)12)1-13-4-2(3(4)7)5(9)10/h2-4H,1,8H2,(H,9,10)(H,11,12)/t2-,3-,4+,7+/m1/s1; Key:YASVRZWVUGJELU-MDASVERJSA-N

LY-379,268 is a drug that is used in neuroscience research, which acts as a potent and selective agonist for the group II metabotropic glutamate receptors (mGluR_{2/3}).

It is derived from the older mGluR group II agonist eglumegad, and led on to the development of the more potent compound LY-404,039, but is still widely used in research itself. LY-379,268 has sedative, neuroprotective, anti-addictive and anticonvulsant effects in animals, and blocks the effects of PCP and DOI, which has led to research into LY-379,268 and similar compounds as antipsychotic drugs for the treatment of schizophrenia in animals.

There are inconsistent findings about an additional activity as a dopamine D2 receptor partial agonist.

== See also ==
- HYDIA
