= T. cinnabarina =

T. cinnabarina may refer to:

- Trametes cinnabarina, a saprobic fungus
- Tremella cinnabarina, a Tahitian fungus
- Tubercularia cinnabarina, a filamentous ascomycete
