= C19H19N3O3 =

The molecular formula C_{19}H_{19}N_{3}O_{3} may refer to:

- MMPIP, a drug used in scientific research that acts as a selective antagonist for the metabotropic glutamate receptor subtype mGluR7
- Talampanel, a drug which has been investigated for the treatment of epilepsy, malignant gliomas, and amyotrophic lateral sclerosis
