= LSP2-9166 =

Chemical compound

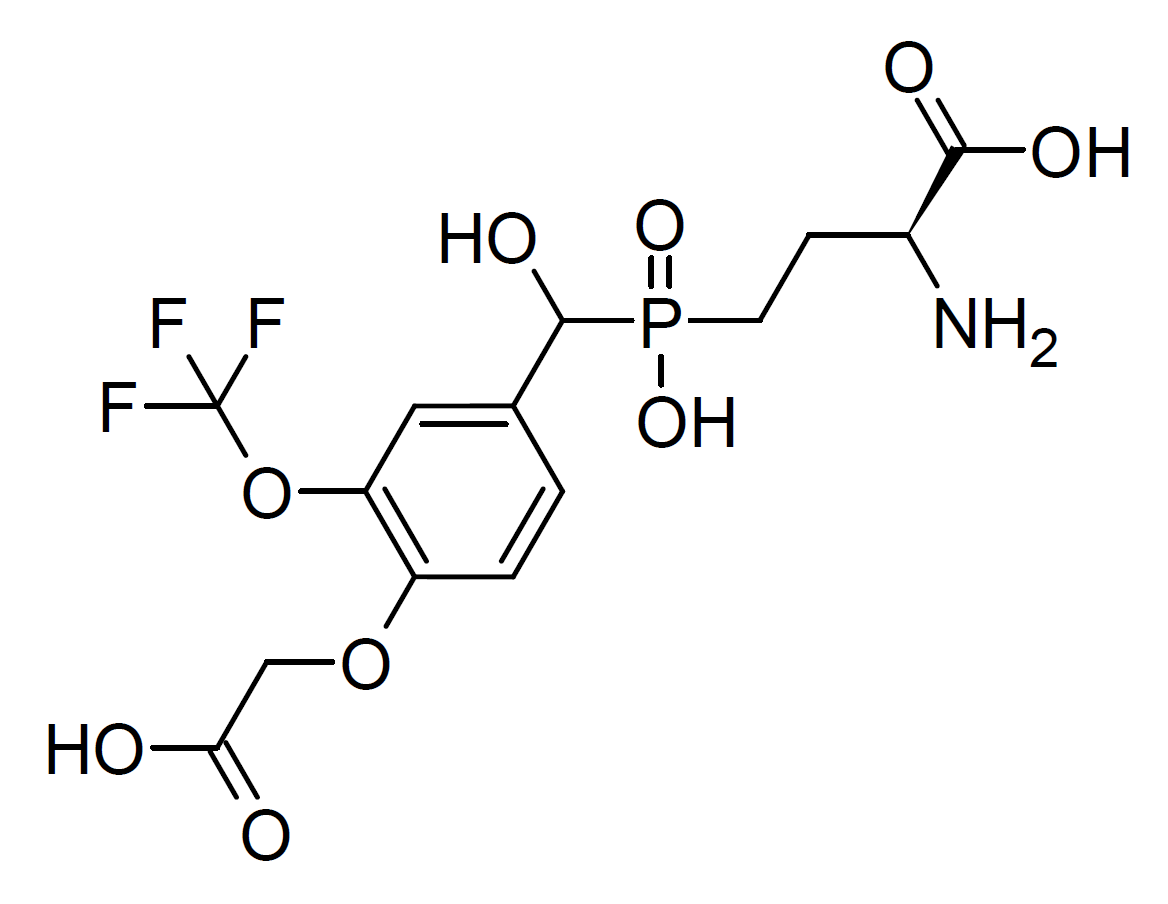

Identifiers
- IUPAC name: (2S)-2-amino-4-[[[4-(carboxymethoxy)-3-(trifluoromethoxy)phenyl]-hydroxymethyl]-hydroxyphosphoryl]butanoic acid
- CAS Number: 1413405-60-3
- PubChem CID: 71042034
- ChemSpider: 98651888

Chemical and physical data
- Formula: C_{14}H_{17}F_{3}NO_{9}P
- Molar mass: 431.257 g·mol^{−1}
- 3D model (JSmol): Interactive image
- SMILES: C1=CC(=C(C=C1C(O)P(=O)(CC[C@@H](C(=O)O)N)O)OC(F)(F)F)OCC(=O)O
- InChI: InChI=1S/C14H17F3NO9P/c15-14(16,17)27-10-5-7(1-2-9(10)26-6-11(19)20)13(23)28(24,25)4-3-8(18)12(21)22/h1-2,5,8,13,23H,3-4,6,18H2,(H,19,20)(H,21,22)(H,24,25)/t8-,13?/m0/s1; Key:NTRJZUQSNSIKLO-OADYLZGLSA-N

LSP2-9166 is a drug which acts as a selective agonist for the group III metabotropic glutamate receptors, with a reasonably potent EC_{50} of 70nM at mGluR_{4} and 220nM at mGluR_{7}, and weaker activity of 1380nM at mGluR_{6} and 4800nM at mGluR_{8}. It has anticonvulsant effects in animal studies, and reduces self-administration of various addictive drugs.
