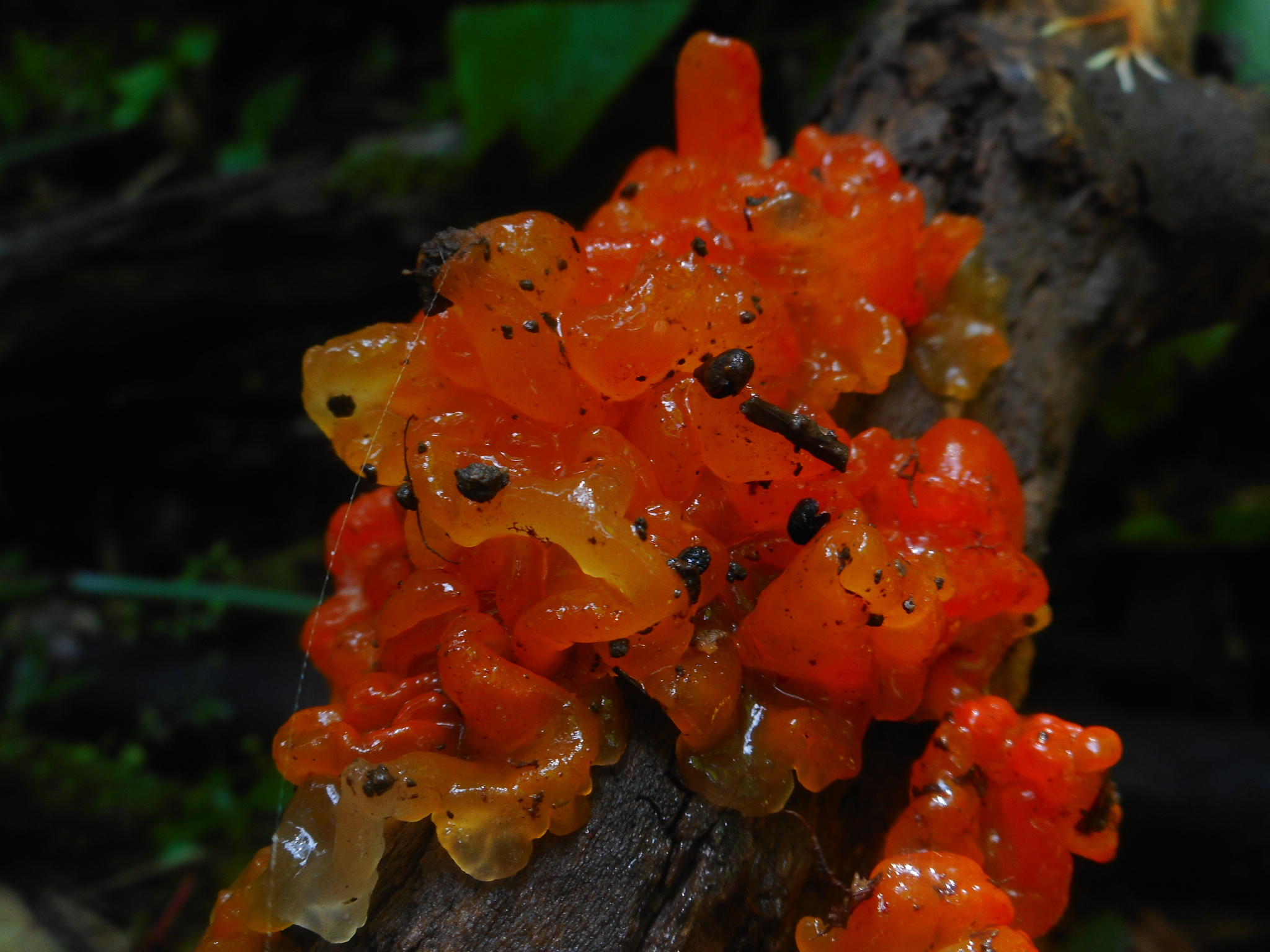

Scientific classification
- Kingdom: Fungi
- Division: Basidiomycota
- Class: Tremellomycetes
- Order: Tremellales
- Family: Tremellaceae
- Genus: Tremella
- Species: T. samoensis

Binomial name
- Tremella samoensis LLoyd (1919)

Synonyms
- Naematelia cinnabarina Mont. (1848) Tremella cinnabarina (Mont.) Pat. (1900) (nom. illegit.)

= Tremella samoensis =

Species of fungus

Tremella samoensis is a species of fungus in the family Tremellaceae. It produces red to orange-yellow, lobed to firmly foliaceous, gelatinous basidiocarps (fruit bodies) and is parasitic on other fungi on dead branches of broad-leaved trees. It was originally described from Samoa, but is widely distributed in the region.

== Taxonomy ==
Tremella samoensis was first published in 1919 by American mycologist Curtis Gates Lloyd, based on a collection he made in Samoa together with material he received from the Philippines. Reviewing the species, Robert Bandoni considered it synonymous with the earlier Naematelia cinnabarina Mont., described from Tahiti in 1848. The combination in Tremella, as T. cinnabarina (Mont.) Pat., is however illegitimate since the name had already been used for a different species.

== Description ==
Fruit bodies are firm, gelatinous, partly bright red, partly orange to yellow, up to 5 cm (2 in) across, and lobed to frondose, the lobes sometimes horn-like. Microscopically, the basidia are tremelloid (ellipsoid, with oblique to vertical septa), 4-celled, 12 to 18 by 8 to 12 μm. The basidiospores are ellipsoid, smooth, 6 to 8 by 4 to 6 μm.

== Similar species ==
Tremella flammea, described from Japan by Yosio Kobayasi, is similarly coloured (scarlet to orange) but is said to be effused-lobate and have slightly smaller spores (5 to 5.5 by 4 to 5 μm). It is not clear if it is a distinct species. Kobayasi later made a collection in New Britain which he identified as T. cinnabarina and considered synonymous with Tremella dahliana, which German mycologist Paul Hennings had originally described from the same location.

Other Tremella species with scarlet to orange colours include Tremella dysenterica, originally described from Brazil, Tremella rubromaculata, originally described from Guatemala, and Tremella erythrina, originally described from China.

== Habitat and distribution ==
Tremella samoensis is a parasite on lignicolous fungi, but its host species is unknown, though the original collection is associated with pyrenomycetes. It is found on dead, attached or fallen branches of broad-leaved trees.

The species was described from Samoa and has been reported from the Philippines, Tahiti, New Britain (as T. cinnabarina), China, Japan, and the Russian Far East.
