= Pomaglumetad methionil =

Chemical compound

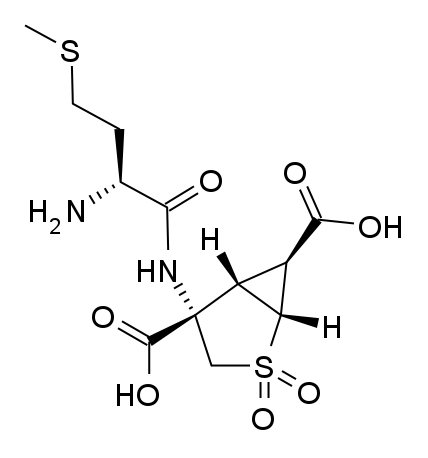

Clinical data
- Other names: LY-2140023; LY2140023; LY-2812223; LY2812223; Pomaglumetad prodrug; LY-404039 prodrug; DB-103; DB103
- Routes of administration: Oral
- Drug class: Metabotropic glutamate mGlu_{2} and mGlu_{3} receptor agonist
- ATC code: None

Pharmacokinetic data
- Bioavailability: 49%
- Protein binding: Minimal
- Elimination half-life: 1.5–2.4 hours Pomaglumetad: 2–6.2 hours

Identifiers
- IUPAC name: (1R,4S,5S,6S)-4-[[(2S)-2-amino-4-methylsulfanylbutanoyl]amino]-2,2-dioxo-2λ^{6}-thiabicyclo[3.1.0]hexane-4,6-dicarboxylic acid
- CAS Number: 635318-55-7
- PubChem CID: 25195354
- DrugBank: DB05096
- ChemSpider: 28530777
- UNII: 3V85EZ3KFQ
- KEGG: D10896
- ChEMBL: ChEMBL2110730
- CompTox Dashboard (EPA): DTXSID00212944

Chemical and physical data
- Formula: C_{12}H_{18}N_{2}O_{7}S_{2}
- Molar mass: 366.40 g·mol^{−1}
- 3D model (JSmol): Interactive image
- SMILES: CSCC[C@@H](C(=O)N[C@]1(CS(=O)(=O)[C@@H]2[C@H]1[C@H]2C(=O)O)C(=O)O)N
- InChI: InChI=1S/C12H18N2O7S2/c1-22-3-2-5(13)9(15)14-12(11(18)19)4-23(20,21)8-6(7(8)12)10(16)17/h5-8H,2-4,13H2,1H3,(H,14,15)(H,16,17)(H,18,19)/t5-,6+,7+,8-,12-/m0/s1; Key:VOYCNOJFAJAILW-CAMHOICYSA-N

Pomaglumetad methionil (INN, USAN; developmental code names LY-2140023 and LY-2812223) is a metabotropic glutamate mGlu_{2} and mGlu_{3} receptor agonist which is or was under development for the treatment of schizophrenia, substance-related disorders, and post-traumatic stress disorder (PTSD). It is taken orally.

== Pharmacology ==
The drug is an inactive prodrug of pomaglumetad (LY-404039), which acts as a highly selective metabotropic glutamate mGlu_{2} and mGlu_{3} receptor agonist. Whereas the oral bioavailability of pomaglumetad was found to be low in humans, pomaglumetad methionil has an estimated oral bioavailability of approximately 49%. The drug is transported by the peptide transporter 1 (PepT1), resulting in it being rapidly and efficiently absorbed, and is then hydrolyzed into pomaglumetad. The elimination half-life of pomaglumetad methionil is 1.5 to 2.4 hours, whereas the half-life of pomaglumetad is 2 to 6.2 hours.

== Development ==
Pomaglumetad methionil was under development by Eli Lilly and Company, Denovo Biopharma, and other institutions. As of January 2025, no recent development has been reported for treatment of schizophrenia or substance-related disorders, whereas development has been discontinued for PTSD. The highest developmental stage that pomaglumetad methionil has reached is phase 2 clinical trials.

== See also ==
- Pomaglumetad § Pomaglumetad methionil
- Eglumetad and talaglumetad
- List of investigational antipsychotics
