= Tremella erythrina =

Scientific classification
- Kingdom: Fungi
- Division: Basidiomycota
- Class: Tremellomycetes
- Order: Tremellales
- Family: Tremellaceae
- Genus: Tremella
- Species: T. erythrina

Binomial name
- Tremella erythrina Xin Zhan Liu & F.Y. Bai (2019)

Species of fungus

Tremella erythrina is a species of fungus in the family Tremellaceae. It produces orange to red, lobate to foliaceous, gelatinous basidiocarps (fruit bodies) and is parasitic on other fungi on wood of broad-leaved trees. It was originally described from China.

== Taxonomy ==
Tremella erythrina was first published in 2019 by Chinese mycologists Xin-Zhan Liu and Feng-Yan Bai based on collections made in Guangxi Province, China. The species is considered to be close to Tremella mesenterica, the type species of the genus, and hence belongs in Tremella sensu stricto.

== Description ==
Fruit bodies are gelatinous, red to brownish orange, up to 18 mm across, cerebriform (brain-like) to foliaceous, with undulating, hollow lobes. Microscopically, the basidia are tremelloid (globose to broadly ellipsoid, with oblique to vertical septa), 4-celled, 12 to 18 by 13 to 19 μm. The basidiospores are ellipsoid, smooth, 7 to 10 by 5 to 7 μm.

== Similar species ==
Tremella dysenterica and T. rubromaculata are similarly coloured, but were described from Brazil and Guatemala respectively. Tremella samoensis, described from Samoa, and T. flammea, described from Japan, are also similar in colour, but differ microscopically.

== Habitat and distribution ==
Tremella erythrina is a parasite on lignicolous fungi, but its host is unknown. It was originally described from wood of a deciduous tree.

The species is currently only known from China.
