= Talaglumetad =

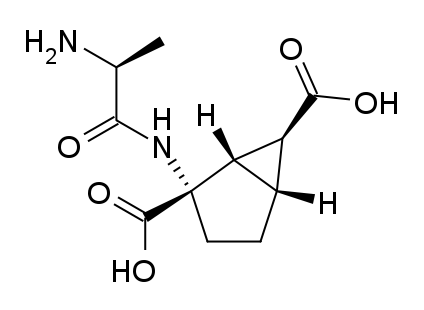

Clinical data
- Other names: LY-544344; LY544344
- Drug class: Metabotropic glutamate mGlu_{2} and mGlu_{3} receptor agonist
- ATC code: None

Pharmacokinetic data
- Bioavailability: 85%

Identifiers
- IUPAC name: (1S,2S,5R,6S)-2-[[(2S)-2-aminopropanoyl]amino]bicyclo[3.1.0]hexane-2,6-dicarboxylic acid
- CAS Number: 441765-98-6
- PubChem CID: 9857256
- DrugBank: DB19742
- ChemSpider: 8032956
- UNII: 2OXQ1Z504M
- ChEMBL: ChEMBL1189257
- CompTox Dashboard (EPA): DTXSID801351482

Chemical and physical data
- Formula: C_{11}H_{16}N_{2}O_{5}
- Molar mass: 256.258 g·mol^{−1}
- 3D model (JSmol): Interactive image
- SMILES: C[C@@H](C(=O)N[C@]1(CC[C@@H]2[C@H]1[C@H]2C(=O)O)C(=O)O)N
- InChI: InChI=1S/C11H16N2O5/c1-4(12)8(14)13-11(10(17)18)3-2-5-6(7(5)11)9(15)16/h4-7H,2-3,12H2,1H3,(H,13,14)(H,15,16)(H,17,18)/t4-,5-,6-,7-,11-/m0/s1; Key:UPSXYNJDCKOCFD-QIMCWZKGSA-N

Talaglumetad (INN, USAN; developmental code name LY-544344) is a metabotropic glutamate mGlu_{2} and mGlu_{3} receptor agonist which was under development for the treatment of generalized anxiety disorder.

== Pharmacology ==
The drug is a prodrug of eglumetad (LY-354740), a potent and selective metabotropic glutamate mGlu_{2} and mGlu_{3} receptor agonist. Eglumetad showed modest oral bioavailability (~10%) and brain penetration in animal and human studies, so talaglumetad was developed to enhance its pharmacokinetic properties for clinical use. Through uptake by the peptide transporter 1 (PepT1), the drug increased systemic exposure to eglumetad in humans by approximately 13-fold relative to administration of eglumetad itself, with an approximate oral bioavailability of 85%. Eglumetad shows anxiolytic-like effects in animals and talaglumetad produced anxiolytic effects in humans. The drug did not produce the problematic side effects typical of benzodiazepines in clinical studies.

== Development ==
Talaglumetad was under development by Eli Lilly and Company. It appears to have been under development until at least 2005. The drug reached phase 2 clinical trials for treatment of generalized anxiety disorder. However, development of talaglumetad was discontinued due to findings of convulsions in preclinical rodent studies.

== See also ==
- Eglumetad
- Pomaglumetad
- Pomaglumetad methionil
