= C13H13NO4 =

The molecular formula C_{13}H_{13}NO_{4} (molar mass: 247.25 g/mol, exact mass: 247.0845 u) may refer to:

- CPCCOEt
- CX614

CX614 has been studied as a positive allosteric modulator of AMPA receptors, with research finding that it can stimulate brain-derived neurotrophic factor (BDNF) release and dendritic protein synthesis.
