= VU0155041 =

Identifiers
- IUPAC name: (1R,2S)-2-[(3,5-dichlorophenyl)carbamoyl]cyclohexane-1-carboxylic acid
- CAS Number: 1263273-14-8
- PubChem CID: 888023
- IUPHAR/BPS: 3323
- ChemSpider: 776108
- ChEMBL: ChEMBL578988

Chemical and physical data
- Formula: C_{14}H_{15}Cl_{2}NO_{3}
- Molar mass: 316.18 g·mol^{−1}
- 3D model (JSmol): Interactive image
- SMILES: C1CC[C@H]([C@H](C1)C(=O)NC2=CC(=CC(=C2)Cl)Cl)C(=O)O
- InChI: InChI=1S/C14H15Cl2NO3/c15-8-5-9(16)7-10(6-8)17-13(18)11-3-1-2-4-12(11)14(19)20/h5-7,11-12H,1-4H2,(H,17,18)(H,19,20)/t11-,12+/m0/s1; Key:VSMUYYFJVFSVCA-NWDGAFQWSA-N

VU0155041 is an experimental drug that is a positive allosteric modulator for the glutamate receptor mGluR4. In animal studies it has anti-Parkinsonian action, reduces neuropathic pain such as allodynia, and counteracts the effects of opioid addiction.
