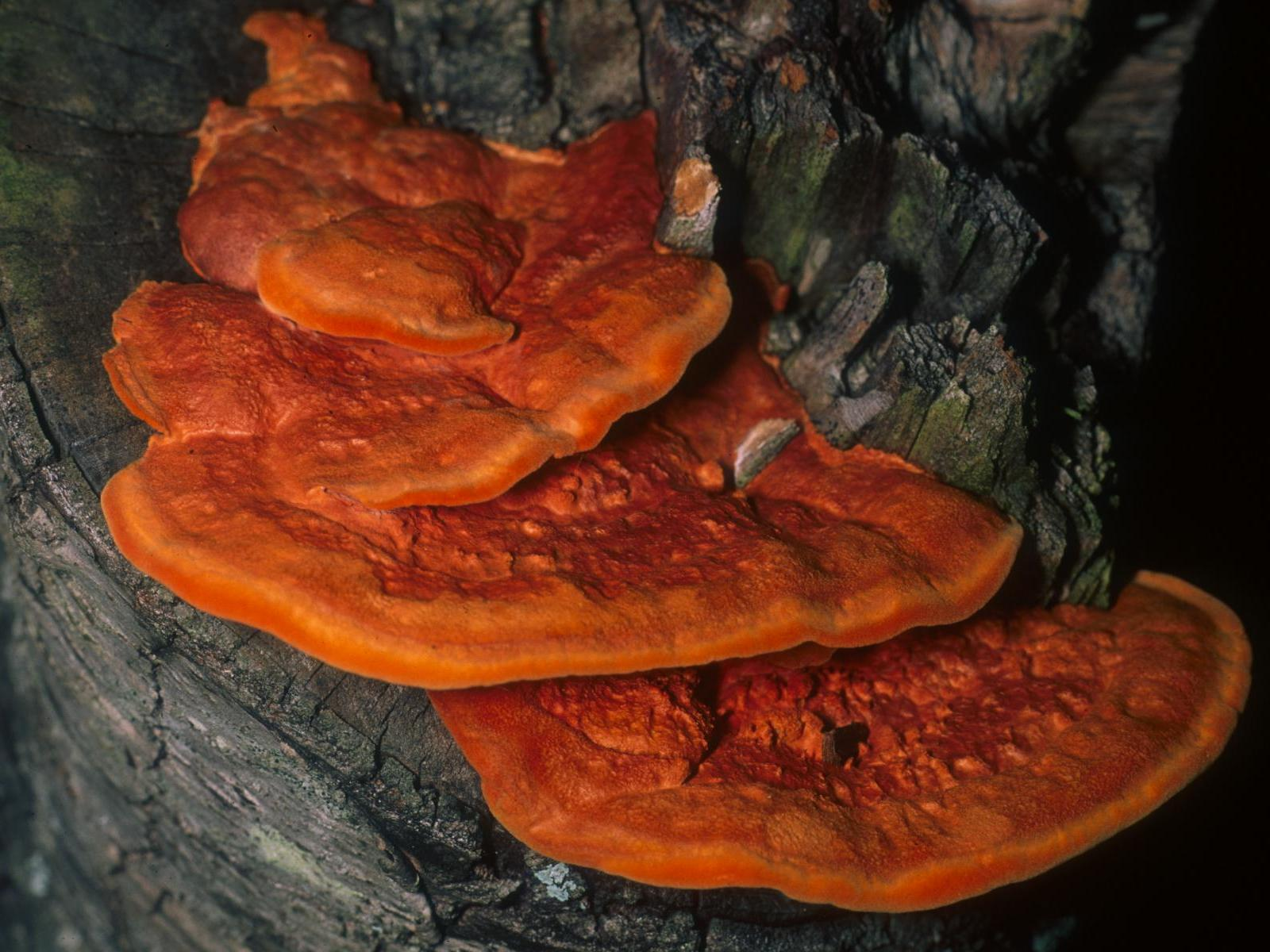

Scientific classification
- Kingdom: Fungi
- Division: Basidiomycota
- Class: Agaricomycetes
- Order: Polyporales
- Family: Polyporaceae
- Genus: Pycnoporus
- Species: P. cinnabarinus

Binomial name
- Pycnoporus cinnabarinus (Jacq.) P.Karst. (1881)

Synonyms
- Boletus cinnabarinus Jacq. (1776); Trametes cinnabarina

= Pycnoporus cinnabarinus =

Species of fungus

Pycnoporus cinnabarinus
- Mycological characteristics
- Pores on hymenium
- Hymenium attachment is not applicable
- Lacks a stipe
- Ecology is saprotrophic
- Edibility is inedible

Pycnoporus cinnabarinus, also known as the cinnabar polypore, is a saprophytic, white rot decomposer.

Its fruit body is a bright orangish shelf fungus up to 12 centimetres (4 3/4 in) across and 1.5 cm (5/8 in) thick. It stains dark in potassium hydroxide. There 2–4 pores per mm. The spore print is white.

It is common in many areas and is widely distributed throughout the world. It is inedible. It produces cinnabarinic acid to protect itself from bacteria.

== Ecology ==
Pycnoporus cinnabarinus contribute to forest ecological heath by breaking down lignin in the wood of dead trees. Its ability to break down lignin facilitates nutrient cycling in mostly deciduous and temperate woodlands that contain hardwoods. Although primarily recognized as a saprophytic fungus, it has also been observed in mycorrhizal relationships under certain forest conditions which is not fully understood.

This species has also drawn attention for its potential biotechnological applications one of which includes natural flavor production and green chemistry.

== Uses ==
=== Biotechnical applications ===
One of the notable uses of P. cinnabarinus involving biotechnology is its ability to produce enzymes such as laccases and oxidases. Particularly its well studied use in the bioconversion of ferulic acid to vanillin, a valuable natural flavoring agent. This fungus demonstrates potential for natural vanillin production without the addition of synthetic chemicals.
