= Foliglurax =

Chemical compound

Clinical data
- Other names: DT2331; PXT-002331; PXT-2331

Identifiers
- IUPAC name: 4-[3-[4-nitroso-2-(5H-thieno[3,2-c]pyridin-6-ylidene)chromen-6-yl]propyl]morpholine
- CAS Number: 1883329-53-0 1883329-51-8 (dihydrochloride)
- PubChem CID: 135565465
- ChemSpider: 59718537
- UNII: FR50CP1D6W

Chemical and physical data
- Formula: C_{23}H_{23}N_{3}O_{3}S
- Molar mass: 421.52 g·mol^{−1}
- 3D model (JSmol): Interactive image
- SMILES: C1COCCN1CCCC2=CC3=C(C=C2)OC(=C4C=C5C(=CN4)C=CS5)C=C3N=O
- InChI: InChI=1S/C23H23N3O3S/c27-25-19-13-22(20-14-23-17(15-24-20)5-11-30-23)29-21-4-3-16(12-18(19)21)2-1-6-26-7-9-28-10-8-26/h3-5,11-15,24H,1-2,6-10H2; Key:XHRLGFLGWZIPEE-UHFFFAOYSA-N

Foliglurax (developmental code names PXT-002331, DT2331) is a positive allosteric modulator of the metabotropic glutamate receptor 4 (mGluR_{4}), which is under development by Prexton Therapeutics for the treatment of Parkinson's disease. It reached phase II clinical trials, but while it was found to be safe and showed some signs of clinical improvement, it failed to sufficiently distinguish itself from placebo to meet the study endpoints.

The other tautomeric form of foliglurax.

== See also ==
- List of investigational Parkinson's disease drugs
