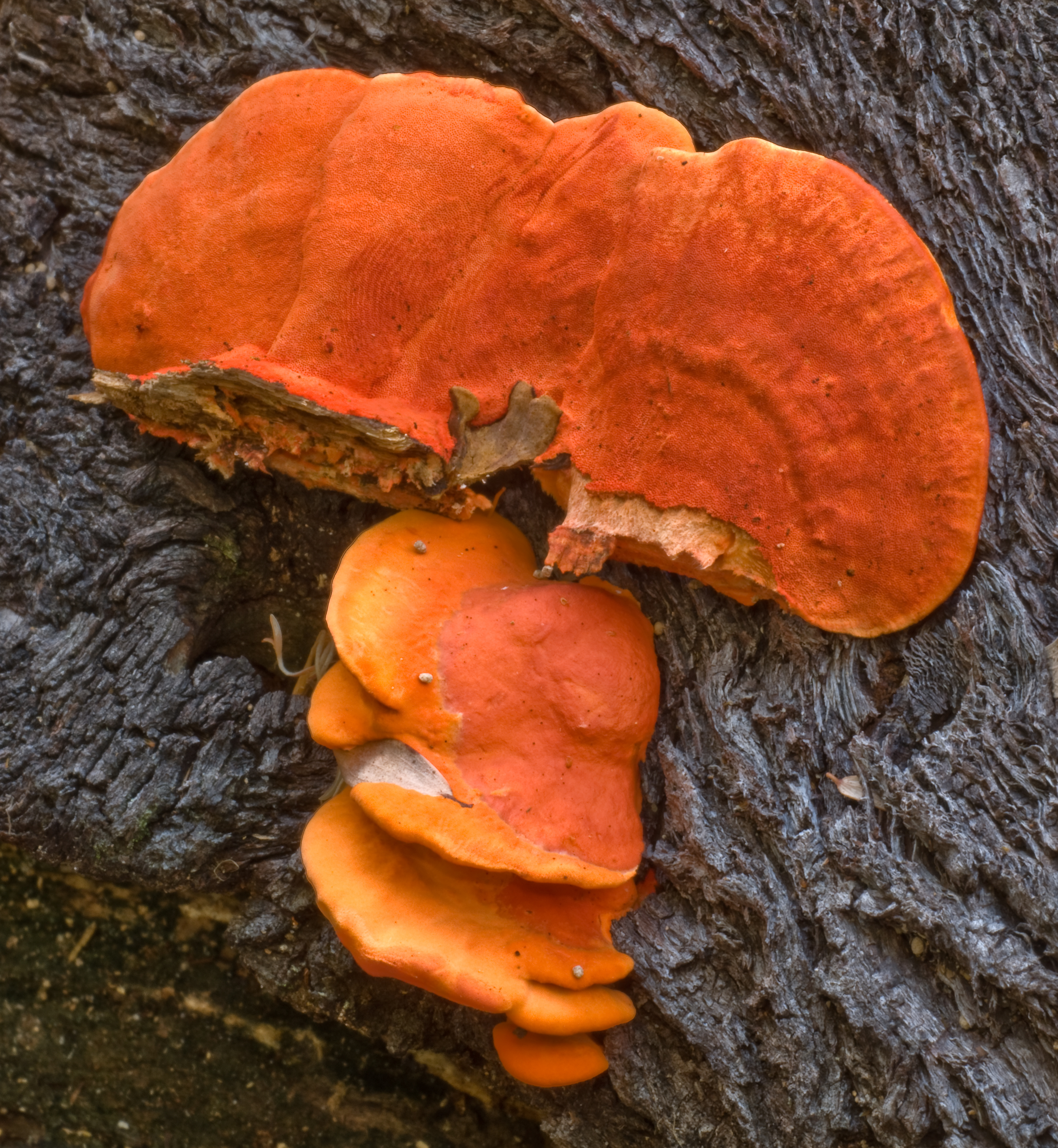

Scientific classification
- Kingdom: Fungi
- Division: Basidiomycota
- Class: Agaricomycetes
- Order: Polyporales
- Family: Polyporaceae
- Genus: Pycnoporus
- Species: P. coccineus

Binomial name
- Pycnoporus coccineus (Fr.) Bondartsev & Singer (1941)

Synonyms
- Polyporus coccineus Fr. (1851); Fomes coccineus (Fr.) Sacc. (1888); Scindalma coccineum (Fr.) Kuntze (1898); Polystictus coccineus (Fr.) Lloyd (1916)

= Pycnoporus coccineus =

Species of fungus

Pycnoporus coccineus
- Mycological characteristics
- Pores on hymenium
- Hymenium attachment is not applicable
- Lacks a stipe
- Ecology is saprotrophic
- Edibility is unknown

Pycnoporus coccineus is a saprophytic, white-rot decomposer fungus in the family Polyporaceae. A widely distributed species, the fungus was first described scientifically by Elias Magnus Fries in 1851. A study conducted by Couturier al et. (2015) concluded that the combined analysis of sugar and solid residues showed the suitability of P. coccineus secreted enzymes for softwood degradation. P. coccineus is a promising model to better understand the challenges of softwood biomass deconstruction and its use in biorefinery processes.
