= ADX88178 =

Identifiers
- IUPAC name: 5-methyl-N-(4-methylpyrimidin-2-yl)-4-(1H-pyrazol-4-yl)-1,3-thiazol-2-amine
- CAS Number: 1235318-89-4
- PubChem CID: 46836872
- IUPHAR/BPS: 6238
- ChemSpider: 28294729
- ChEMBL: ChEMBL3609729

Chemical and physical data
- Formula: C_{12}H_{12}N_{6}S
- Molar mass: 272.33 g·mol^{−1}
- 3D model (JSmol): Interactive image
- SMILES: CC1=NC(=NC=C1)NC2=NC(=C(S2)C)C3=CNN=C3
- InChI: InChI=1S/C12H12N6S/c1-7-3-4-13-11(16-7)18-12-17-10(8(2)19-12)9-5-14-15-6-9/h3-6H,1-2H3,(H,14,15)(H,13,16,17,18); Key:MIQNXKWDQRNHAU-UHFFFAOYSA-N

ADX88178 is an experimental drug that acts as a positive allosteric modulator for the glutamate receptor mGluR4. It was developed as a potential medication for the treatment of Parkinson's disease but had mixed results in animal studies, improving dyskinesia but worsening psychosis-like symptoms. However it has antiinflammatory effects in brain tissue which may make it useful for other indications.
