= PPM1A =

Protein-coding gene in the species Homo sapiens

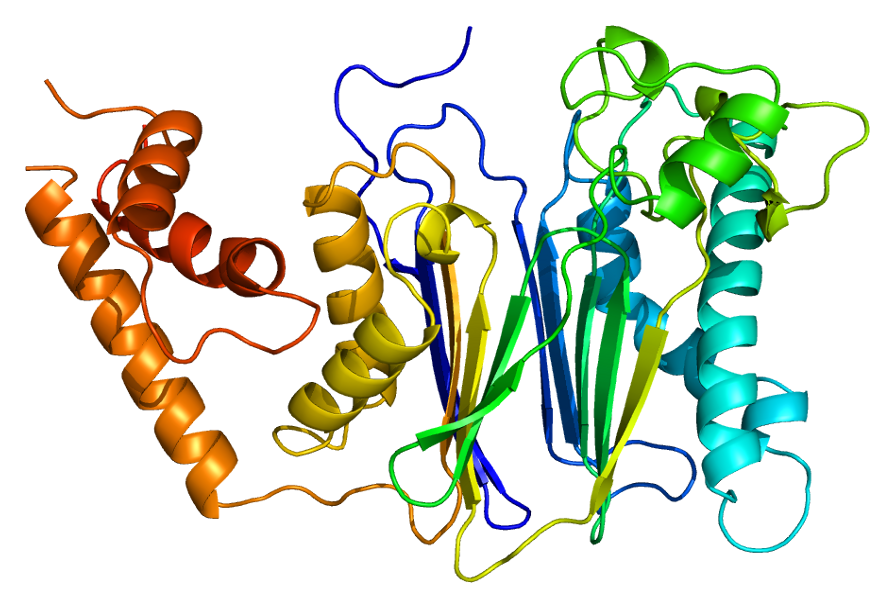

Identifiers
- Aliases: PPM1A, PP2C-ALPHA, PP2CA, PP2Calpha, protein phosphatase, Mg2+/Mn2+ dependent 1A
- External IDs: OMIM: 606108; MGI: 99878; GeneCards: PPM1A
Available structures
PDB	Ortholog search: PDBe RCSB
PDB	List of PDB id codes 1A6Q, 3FXJ, 3FXK, 3FXL, 3FXM, 3FXO, 4RA2, 4RAF, 4RAG
Enzyme activity
EC #	BRENDA	ExPASy	KEGG	MetaCyc
3.1.3.16	↗	↗	↗	↗

Gene location (Human)
Chr.	Chromosome 14 (human)
Band	14q23.1	Start	60,245,752 bp
Band	14q23.1	End	60,299,087 bp

Gene location (Mouse)
Chr.	Chromosome 12 (mouse)
Band	12|12 C3	Start	72,757,455 bp
Band	12|12 C3	End	72,799,819 bp
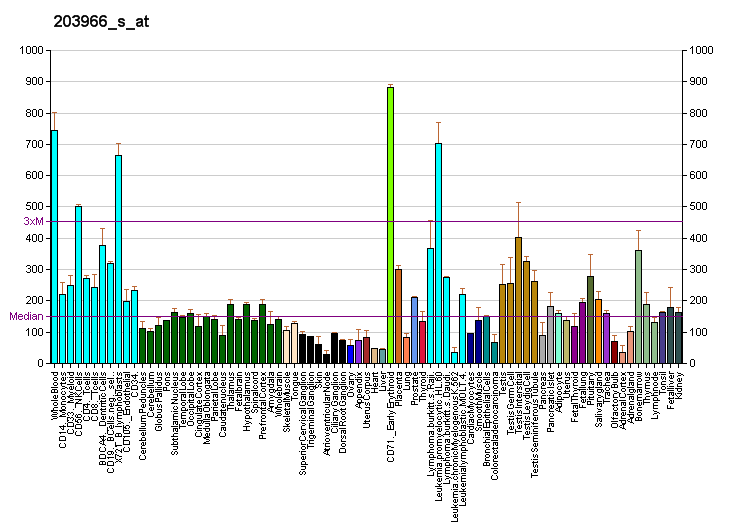

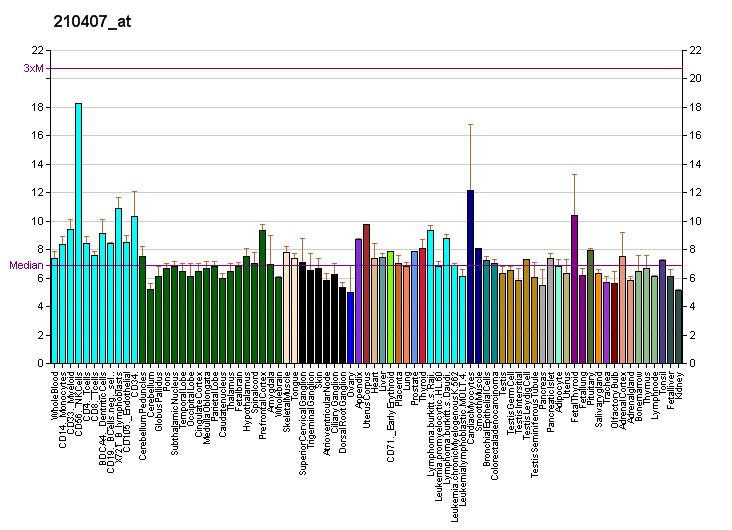
RNA expression pattern
Bgee	Human / Mouse (ortholog); Top expressed in: sperm; oocyte; biceps brachii; secondary oocyte; Skeletal muscle tissue of biceps brachii; jejunal mucosa; amniotic fluid; parotid gland; left testis; glutes / Top expressed in: muscle of thigh; morula; substantia nigra; otic placode; spermatid; neural layer of retina; dentate gyrus of hippocampal formation granule cell; triceps brachii muscle; digastric muscle; superior frontal gyrus; More reference expression data
BioGPS	More reference expression data
Gene ontology
Molecular function	R-SMAD binding; phosphoprotein phosphatase activity; manganese ion binding; protein serine/threonine phosphatase activity; calmodulin-dependent protein phosphatase activity; signal transducer activity; metal ion binding; catalytic activity; protein binding; cation binding; hydrolase activity; magnesium ion binding
Cellular component	cytoplasm; membrane; nucleoplasm; nucleus; cytosol; plasma membrane
Biological process	cellular response to transforming growth factor beta stimulus; peptidyl-threonine dephosphorylation; negative regulation of SMAD protein complex assembly; protein dephosphorylation; negative regulation of transforming growth factor beta receptor signaling pathway; Wnt signaling pathway; negative regulation of transcription by RNA polymerase II; negative regulation of I-kappaB kinase/NF-kappaB signaling; negative regulation of BMP signaling pathway; positive regulation of protein export from nucleus; positive regulation of Wnt signaling pathway; positive regulation of transcription, DNA-templated; N-terminal protein myristoylation; positive regulation of I-kappaB kinase/NF-kappaB signaling; dephosphorylation
Sources:Amigo / QuickGO
Orthologs
Databases	NCBI: entry; OMA: entry
Species	Human	Mouse
Entrez	5494	19042
Ensembl	ENSG00000100614	ENSMUSG00000021096
UniProt	P35813	P49443
RefSeq (mRNA)	NM_021003; NM_177951; NM_177952	NM_008910
RefSeq (protein)	NP_066283; NP_808820; NP_808821	NP_032936
Location (UCSC)	Chr 14: 60.25 – 60.3 Mb	Chr 12: 72.76 – 72.8 Mb
PubMed search
- Wikidata
View/Edit Human	View/Edit Mouse

Protein phosphatase 1A is an enzyme that in humans is encoded by the PPM1A gene.

The protein encoded by this gene is a member of the PP2C family of Ser/Thr protein phosphatases. PP2C family members are known to be negative regulators of cell stress response pathways. This phosphatase dephosphorylates, and negatively regulates the activities of, MAP kinases and MAP kinase kinases. It has been shown to inhibit the activation of p38 and JNK kinase cascades induced by environmental stresses. This phosphatase can also dephosphorylate cyclin-dependent kinases, and thus may be involved in cell cycle control. Overexpression of this phosphatase is reported to activate the expression of the tumor suppressor gene TP53/p53, which leads to G2/M cell cycle arrest and apoptosis. Three alternatively spliced transcript variants encoding two distinct isoforms have been described.

== Interactions ==
PPM1A has been shown to interact with Metabotropic glutamate receptor 3. In 2006, Dr. Feng found that PPM1A can terminate TGF-beta signaling by inactivating Smad3 via dephosphorylation. Smad3 is an essential component of the TGF-beta signalling pathway.
