= TC-N 22A =

Identifiers
- IUPAC name: 4,5,6,8-Tetrahydro-N-2-pyridinylpyrazolo[3',4':6,7]cyclohepta[1,2]thiazol-2-amine
- CAS Number: 1314140-00-5
- PubChem CID: 46836562
- IUPHAR/BPS: 6231
- ChemSpider: 26612639
- ChEMBL: ChEMBL1830707

Chemical and physical data
- Formula: C_{14}H_{13}N_{5}S
- Molar mass: 283.35 g·mol^{−1}
- 3D model (JSmol): Interactive image
- SMILES: C2(SC(NC4=NC=CC=C4)=N3)=C3C1=CNN=C1CCC2
- InChI: InChI=1S/C14H13N5S/c1-2-7-15-12(6-1)17-14-18-13-9-8-16-19-10(9)4-3-5-11(13)20-14/h1-2,6-8H,3-5H2,(H,16,19)(H,15,17,18); Key:DBISXWCOHGUFSF-UHFFFAOYSA-N

TC-N 22A is an experimental drug that is a positive allosteric modulator for the glutamate receptor mGluR4. It was developed as a potential medication for the treatment of Parkinson's disease, and has also been used as a lead compound for the development of further derivatives.
