= CECXG =

Chemical compound

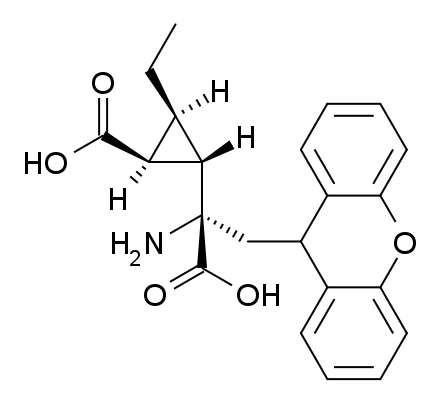

Identifiers
- IUPAC name: 2-(1'SR,2'SR,3'SR)-2'-carboxy-3'-ethylcyclopropyl-2-(9-xanthylmethyl)glycine
- CAS Number: 216164-12-4
- PubChem CID: 44329042
- ChemSpider: 28190823

Chemical and physical data
- Formula: C_{22}H_{23}NO_{5}
- Molar mass: 381.428 g·mol^{−1}
- 3D model (JSmol): Interactive image
- SMILES: c4cccc2c4Oc3ccccc3C2CC(N)(C(O)=O)C1C(C(=O)O)C1CC
- InChI: InChI=1S/C22H23NO5/c1-2-12-18(20(24)25)19(12)22(23,21(26)27)11-15-13-7-3-5-9-16(13)28-17-10-6-4-8-14(15)17/h3-10,12,15,18-19H,2,11,23H2,1H3,(H,24,25)(H,26,27)/t12-,18+,19+,22+/m1/s1; Key:NBAKIHCDPVZWRB-KQLBNOIASA-N

CECXG (3'-ethyl-LY-341,495) is a research drug which acts as a potent and selective antagonist for the group II metabotropic glutamate receptors (mGluR_{2/3}), with reasonable selectivity for mGluR_{3}. While it is some five times less potent than LY-341,495 at mGluR_{3}, it has 38x higher affinity for mGluR_{3} over mGluR_{2}, making it one of the few ligands available that is able to distinguish between these two closely related receptor subtypes.
