= ML337 =

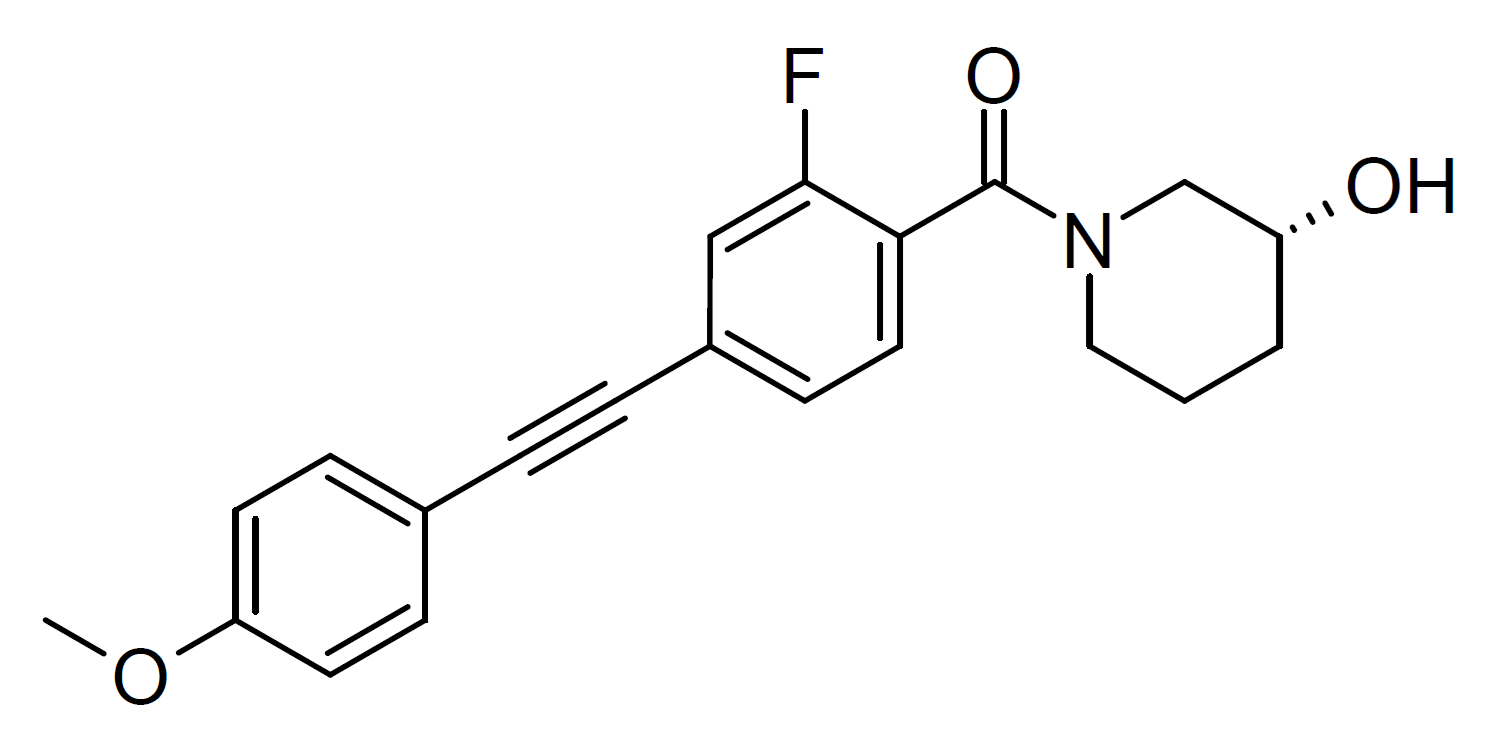

Identifiers
- IUPAC name: (R)-(2-fluoro-4-[(4-methoxyphenyl)ethynyl]phenyl)(3-hydroxypiperidin-1-yl)methanone
- CAS Number: 1443118-44-2
- PubChem CID: 60204017
- IUPHAR/BPS: 8765
- ChemSpider: 29785018
- ChEMBL: ChEMBL2385886

Chemical and physical data
- Formula: C_{21}H_{20}FNO_{3}
- Molar mass: 353.393 g·mol^{−1}
- 3D model (JSmol): Interactive image
- SMILES: COC1=CC=C(C=C1)C#CC2=CC(=C(C=C2)C(=O)N3CCC[C@H](C3)O)F
- InChI: InChI=1S/C21H20FNO3/c1-26-18-9-6-15(7-10-18)4-5-16-8-11-19(20(22)13-16)21(25)23-12-2-3-17(24)14-23/h6-11,13,17,24H,2-3,12,14H2,1H3/t17-/m1/s1; Key:QBCRLDPMQHPGIM-QGZVFWFLSA-N

ML337 is an experimental drug that acts as a negative allosteric modulator selective for the glutamate receptor mGluR3. It has only moderate potency with an IC_{50} of 450 nM, but is highly selective over the closely related subtype mGluR2 with no effect even at 30,000 nM, and so has been used to study the effects of mGluR3 in isolation, which had previously been difficult to separate from mGluR2 mediated effects.
