= AZ12216052 =

Chemical compound

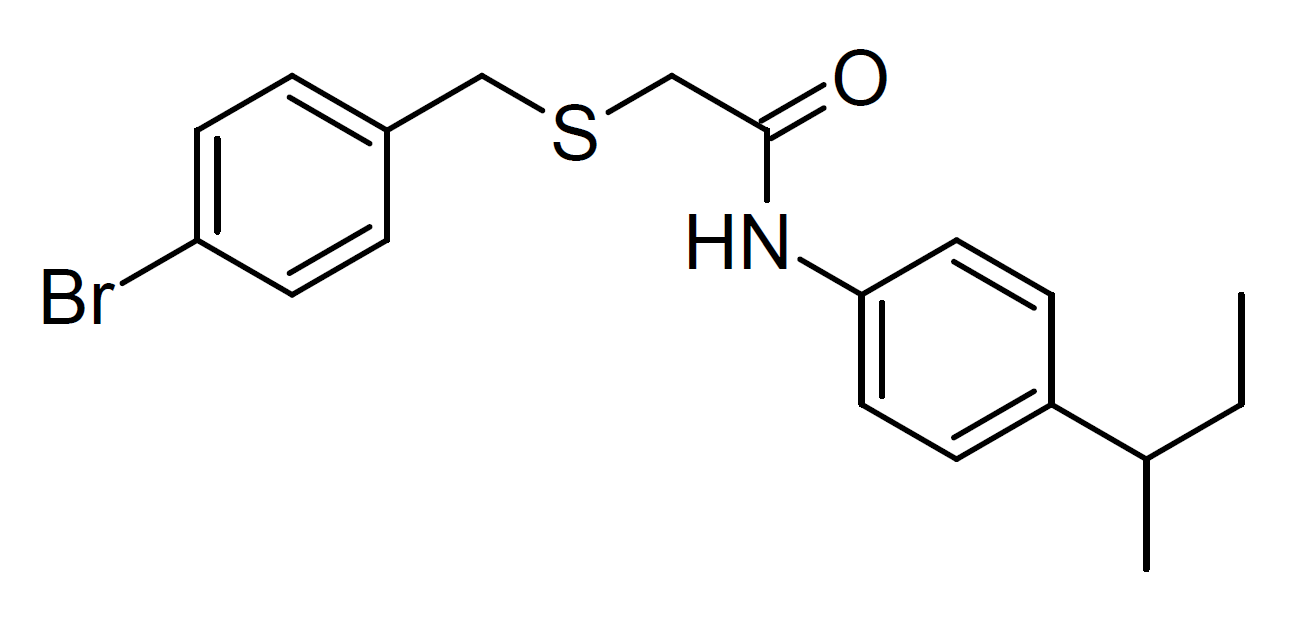

Identifiers
- IUPAC name: 2-[(4-bromophenyl)methylsulfanyl]-N-(4-butan-2-ylphenyl)acetamide
- CAS Number: 1290628-31-7
- PubChem CID: 73755190
- ChemSpider: 29342334

Chemical and physical data
- Formula: C_{19}H_{22}BrNOS
- Molar mass: 392.36 g·mol^{−1}
- 3D model (JSmol): Interactive image
- SMILES: CCC(C)C1=CC=C(C=C1)NC(=O)CSCC2=CC=C(C=C2)Br
- InChI: InChI=1S/C19H22BrNOS/c1-3-14(2)16-6-10-18(11-7-16)21-19(22)13-23-12-15-4-8-17(20)9-5-15/h4-11,14H,3,12-13H2,1-2H3,(H,21,22); Key:QKUYZJOTWYRWNF-UHFFFAOYSA-N

AZ-12216052 is a drug which acts as a potent and selective positive allosteric modulator of the metabotropic glutamate receptor 8, and is used for research into the role of this receptor subtype in various processes including anxiety and neuropathic pain.
