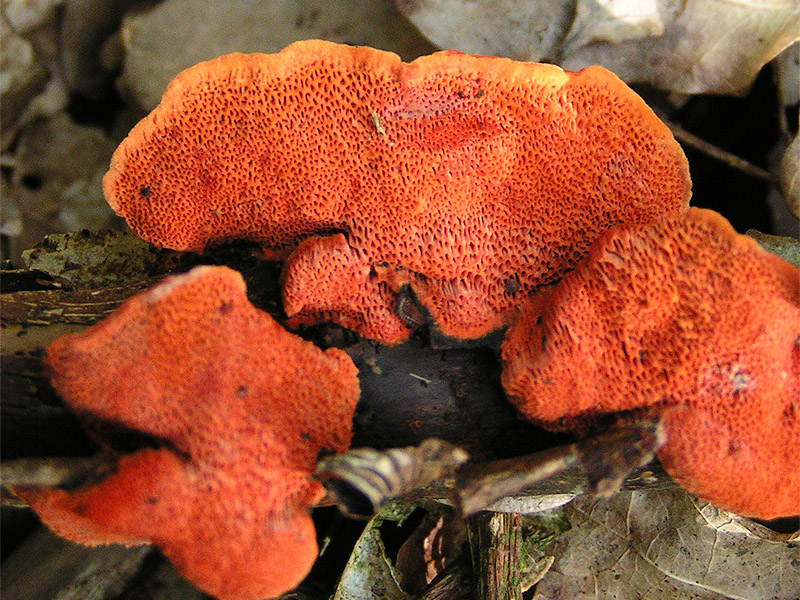
- Pycnoporus cinnabarinus

Scientific classification
- Kingdom: Fungi
- Division: Basidiomycota
- Class: Agaricomycetes
- Order: Polyporales
- Family: Polyporaceae
- Genus: Pycnoporus; P.Karst. (1881)

Type species
- Pycnoporus cinnabarinus (Jacq.) P.Karst. (1881)

Species
- Pycnoporus cinnabarinus; Pycnoporus coccineus; Pycnoporus palibini; Pycnoporus puniceus; Pycnoporus sanguineus

Synonyms
- Xylometron Paulet (1808)

= Pycnoporus =

Genus of fungi

Pycnoporus is a genus of fungi in the family Polyporaceae. This genus is distinguished from most other polypores because of its brilliant red-orange color. Modern mycology recognizes five distinct species of Pycnoporus: the type P. cinnabarinus, P. coccineus, P. palibini, P. puniceus, and P. sanguineus. These species are divided somewhat by morphology, biogeography, and DNA sequence.

== Biogeography ==
Pycnoporus cinnabarinus occurs in cooler, temperate regions within Europe and North America. Pycnoporus sanguineus occurs in warmer, tropical regions within South America, North America, and Asia. Pycnoporus coccineus occurs in temperate areas of Australia and New Zealand. Pycnoporus puniceus is a rare species found in Southeastern Asia and Malaysia.

== Description ==
Fruiting bodies are typically sessile, corky, slightly tomentose to glaborose. on fallen hardwood logs, but can be on coniferous trees as well. These fungi live in diverse habitats, but are typically located near a source of water. Pileus length x width x height (thickness) can range from 1–9 cm (l) x 1–7 cm (w) x 0.2–2 cm (h). Colors range on the scale of paprika red to flame orange but almost always are vibrant. Spores are white, oblong, somewhat pointed, 2-3 x 4-6 um. KOH reactions yield a dark brown to black color for most specimens but can bleach out (turn white) the pileus of a few specimens over longer time periods. Specimens typically retain their strong red-orange color for long periods of time, especially when dried and stored properly. Yet some turn dingy brown or gray and fade in color over time.

The red colour of Pycnoporus species comes from pigments that are chemically related to phenoxazinone, including cinnabarin, tramesanguin and cinnabarinic acid.

== Identification ==
In order to identify the species of Pycnoporus a few characteristics must be carefully observed. To distinguish between P. cinnabarinus and P. sanguineus one must note the thickness of the pileus. P. cinnabarinus has a fruiting body ranging from 5 to 15 mm in thickness while P. sanguineus ranges from 1–5 mm thick. Additionally P. sanguineus typically contains darker red pigments that do not easily fade. Several collected specimens of P. cinnabarinus show pale orange pigmentation in areas with direct sunlight. Lastly, P. cinnabarinus contains larger pores per mm (2-4) than P. sanguineus with 4-6 pores per mm.

== Uses ==
Pycnoporus fungi are used heavily for industry because of their ability to produce powerful lignolytic enzymes that break down lignin and tough polysaccharides in wood and paper. The major enzyme that differentiates this fungus from other white rotters is laccase and under the correct conditions Pycnoporus can produce large concentrations of this enzyme. Pycnoporus fungi also produce copper and iron metalloenzymes that are involved in the chemical transformation of aromatic compounds found in plant cell walls.

Other uses have been reported in Australia. Aboriginal peoples have used it for curing mouth sores, ulcers, and teething of infants.
