= ADX71743 =

Chemical compound

Identifiers
- IUPAC name: 6-(2,4-dimethylphenyl)-2-ethyl-4,5,6,7-tetrahydro-1,3-benzoxazol-4-one
- CAS Number: 1431641-29-0
- PubChem CID: 53391766
- IUPHAR/BPS: 6217
- ChemSpider: 34980747
- ChEMBL: ChEMBL4174742

Chemical and physical data
- Formula: C_{17}H_{19}NO_{2}
- Molar mass: 269.344 g·mol^{−1}
- 3D model (JSmol): Interactive image
- SMILES: CCC1=NC2=C(O1)CC(CC2=O)C3=C(C=C(C=C3)C)C
- InChI: InChI=1S/C17H19NO2/c1-4-16-18-17-14(19)8-12(9-15(17)20-16)13-6-5-10(2)7-11(13)3/h5-7,12H,4,8-9H2,1-3H3; Key:CPKZCQHJDFSOJT-UHFFFAOYSA-N

ADX71743 is a drug which acts as a potent and selective negative allosteric modulator of the metabotropic glutamate receptor 7. Few selective ligands are available for this receptor, and so ADX71743 has played an important role into scientific research into the role of this receptor in various processes such as memory formation, nociception, absence seizures and psychosis.
