= DCPG =

Chemical

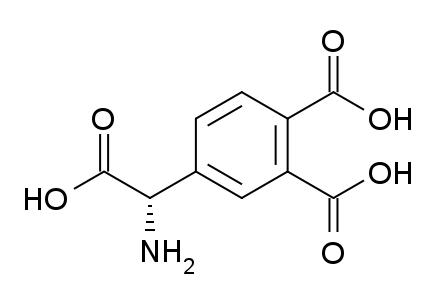

Identifiers
- IUPAC name: 4-[(1S)-1-amino-2-hydroxy-2-oxoethyl]phthalic acid
- CAS Number: 201730-11-2
- PubChem CID: 16062593
- IUPHAR/BPS: 1407
- ChemSpider: 17222214
- UNII: W3Y53JA9W3
- CompTox Dashboard (EPA): DTXSID60581628
- ECHA InfoCard: 100.161.870

Chemical and physical data
- Formula: C_{10}H_{9}NO_{6}
- Molar mass: 239.183 g·mol^{−1}
- 3D model (JSmol): Interactive image
- SMILES: O=C(O)[C@@H](N)c1cc(c(C(=O)O)cc1)C(=O)O
- InChI: InChI=1S/C10H9NO6/c11-7(10(16)17)4-1-2-5(8(12)13)6(3-4)9(14)15/h1-3,7H,11H2,(H,12,13)(H,14,15)(H,16,17)/t7-/m0/s1; Key:IJVMOGKBEVRBPP-ZETCQYMHSA-N

DCPG ((S)-3,4-DCPG) is a drug used in scientific research, which acts as a potent and subtype-selective agonist for the metabotropic glutamate receptor mGluR_{8}. It has anticonvulsant effects in animal studies, and has also been investigated as a possible treatment for hyperalgesia.
