= Valiglurax =

Identifiers
- IUPAC name: N-(2H-pyrazolo[3,4-b]pyridin-3-yl)-1-(trifluoromethyl)isoquinolin-6-amine
- CAS Number: 1976050-09-5
- PubChem CID: 134191471
- IUPHAR/BPS: 10135
- ChemSpider: 88296853
- ChEMBL: ChEMBL4797139

Chemical and physical data
- Formula: C_{16}H_{10}F_{3}N_{5}
- Molar mass: 329.286 g·mol^{−1}
- 3D model (JSmol): Interactive image
- SMILES: C1=CC2=C(NN=C2N=C1)NC3=CC4=C(C=C3)C(=NC=C4)C(F)(F)F
- InChI: InChI=1S/C16H10F3N5/c17-16(18,19)13-11-4-3-10(8-9(11)5-7-20-13)22-15-12-2-1-6-21-14(12)23-24-15/h1-8H,(H2,21,22,23,24); Key:RUEXKBWCUUFJMY-UHFFFAOYSA-N

Valiglurax (VU0652957) is an experimental drug that is a positive allosteric modulator for the glutamate receptor mGluR4. It was developed as a potential medication for the treatment of Parkinson's disease.
