= Cinnabarinic acid =

Chemical compound

Names
- IUPAC name 2-amino-3-oxophenoxazine-1,9-dicarboxylic acid
- Other names 3-Hydroxyanthranilic acid dimer

Identifiers
| CAS Number | 606-59-7 |
| 3D model (JSmol) | Interactive image |
| ChEBI | CHEBI:3715 |
| ChEMBL | ChEMBL2322655 |
| ChemSpider | 102864 |
| KEGG | C05640 |
| PubChem CID | 114918 |
| UNII | 2XYB6EX2PG |
| CompTox Dashboard (EPA) | DTXSID30209408 |
- InChI: InChI=1S/C14H8N2O6/c15-10-6(17)4-8-12(9(10)14(20)21)16-11-5(13(18)19)2-1-3-7(11)22-8/h1-4H,15H2,(H,18,19)(H,20,21) Key: FSBKJYLVDRVPTK-UHFFFAOYSA-N
- SMILES: C1=CC(=C2C(=C1)OC3=CC(=O)C(=C(C3=N2)C(=O)O)N)C(=O)O

Properties
| Chemical formula | C_{12}H_{8}N_{2}O_{6} |
| Molar mass | 276.204 g·mol^{−1} |

Supplementary data page
- [[]]
- Except where otherwise noted, data are given for materials in their standard state (at 25 °C [77 °F], 100 kPa). Infobox references

Cinnabarinic acid is a metabolite formed through the oxidative processing of tryptophan. It is an endogenous metabolite of the kynurenine pathway of tryptophan catabolism, formed by oxidative dimerization of two molecules of 3-hydroxyanthranilic acid. It functions both as a partial agonist at type 4 metabotropic glutamate receptors (mGlu_{4}) and as a ligand for the aryl hydrocarbon receptor (AhR), with implications for neuroprotection and immunomodulation.

Studies have demonstrated that the compound functions as a selective, low-efficacy agonist at the metabotropic glutamate receptor 4 (mGlu_{4}), where it modulates cyclic adenosine monophosphate and inositol phosphate signaling pathways in neuronal cells, an effect that has been linked to potential neuroprotective properties. It has been also shown to bind and activate the aryl hydrocarbon receptor in immune cells, thereby driving interleukin-22 production in T helper subsets and shifting the balance between Th17 and regulatory T cells.

Cinnabarinic acid has emerged as a key mediator at the crossroads of neuroimmunology. In preclinical models of excitotoxic injury, it appears to confer neuroprotective effects through metabotropic glutamate receptor 4–mediated signaling. In addition, by engaging the aryl hydrocarbon receptor and inducing interleukin 22, cinnabarinic acid modulates epithelial and barrier immunity. Its contributions to inflammatory processes, hepatic protection, and cellular redox homeostasis remain areas of active investigation.

== See also ==
- Pycnoporus
- Pycnoporus cinnabarinus
- Metabotropic glutamate receptor 4
