= AMN082 =

Names
- IUPAC name N,N′-Dibenzhydrylethane-1,2-diamine

Identifiers
CAS Number	83027-13-8; (dihydrochloride): 97075-46-2
3D model (JSmol)	Interactive image; (dihydrochloride): Interactive image
ChemSpider	1459618; (dihydrochloride): 9873115
PubChem CID	11698390
CompTox Dashboard (EPA)	DTXSID801320362
- InChI: InChI=1S/C28H28N2/c1-5-13-23(14-6-1)27(24-15-7-2-8-16-24)29-21-22-30-28(25-17-9-3-10-18-25)26-19-11-4-12-20-26/h1-20,27-30H,21-22H2 Key: DTZDSNQYNPNCPK-UHFFFAOYSA-N; (dihydrochloride): InChI=1S/C28H28N2.2ClH/c1-5-13-23(14-6-1)27(24-15-7-2-8-16-24)29-21-22-30-28(25-17-9-3-10-18-25)26-19-11-4-12-20-26;;/h1-20,27-30H,21-22H2;2*1H Key: YRQCDCNQANSUPB-UHFFFAOYSA-N
- SMILES: C=1C=CC(=CC1)C(NCCNC(C=2C=CC=CC2)C=3C=CC=CC3)C=4C=CC=CC4; (dihydrochloride): Cl.Cl.N(CCNC(c1ccccc1)c2ccccc2)C(c3ccccc3)c4ccccc4

Properties
Chemical formula	C_{28}H_{28}N_{2}
Molar mass	392.546 g·mol^{−1}
- Except where otherwise noted, data are given for materials in their standard state (at 25 °C [77 °F], 100 kPa). verify (what is ?) Infobox references

AMN082 (N,N′-dibenzhydrylethane-1,2-diamine) is a selective metabotropic glutamate receptor 7 (mGluR7) allosteric agonist. It mimics the effect of glutamate. AMN082 is the first selective mGluR7 agonist and has expanded the potential array of research opportunities on the effects of mGluR7 in the central nervous system.

== Significance ==
The two main types of glutamate receptors are ionotropic receptors and metabotropic receptors. Ionotropic receptors (iGluRs) are fast-acting ligand-gated ion channels and include AMPA receptors, kainate receptors, and NMDA receptors. Metabotropic receptors are G-protein coupled receptors that mediate slower, longer-lasting effects through second messenger systems and are responsible for other neuronal functions that are not typically controlled by iGluRs. mGluRs are split into 3 separate groups (Group I, Group II, Group III) based on pharmacological profile, sequence homology, and preferred signal transduction pathway. mGlur7 is a member of Group III, the least studied of the groups. AMN082 is pharmacological tool used to expand research on Group III mGluRs.
