= XAP044 =

Chemical compound

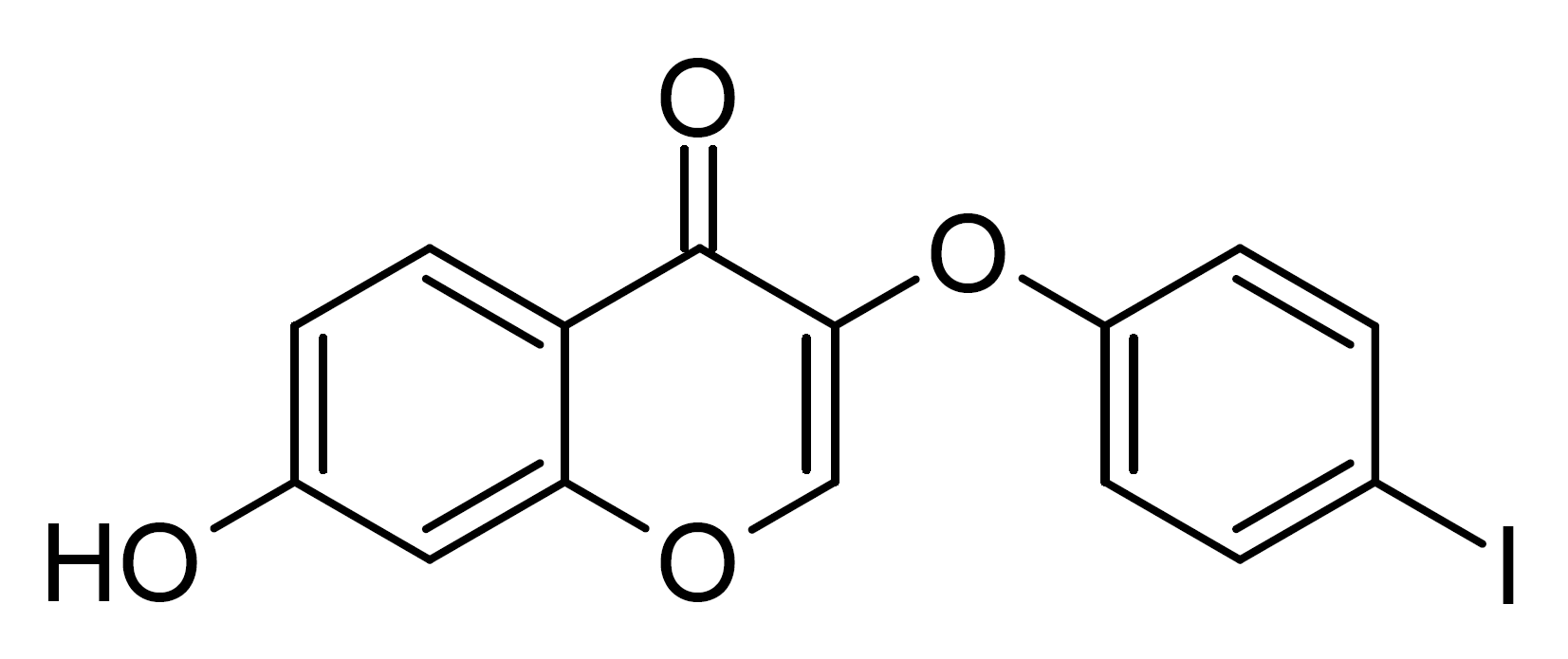

Identifiers
- IUPAC name: 7-hydroxy-3-(4-iodophenoxy)-4H-chromen-4-one
- CAS Number: 196928-50-4
- PubChem CID: 5428913
- IUPHAR/BPS: 8545
- ChemSpider: 4558326

Chemical and physical data
- Formula: C_{15}H_{9}IO_{4}
- Molar mass: 380.137 g·mol^{−1}
- 3D model (JSmol): Interactive image
- SMILES: C1=CC(=CC=C1OC2=COC3=C(C2=O)C=CC(=C3)O)I
- InChI: InChI=1S/C15H9IO4/c16-9-1-4-11(5-2-9)20-14-8-19-13-7-10(17)3-6-12(13)15(14)18/h1-8,17H; Key:XXZKJJYWINSUMJ-UHFFFAOYSA-N

XAP044 is a drug which acts as a potent and selective antagonist of the metabotropic glutamate receptor 7 (mGluR_{7}). It inhibits long-term potentiation in the amygdala and inhibits responses associated with stress and anxiety in animal models, as well as being used to study the role of mGluR_{7} in various other processes.
