= Pomaglumetad =

Chemical compound

Clinical data
- ATC code: none

Legal status
- Legal status: US: Not FDA-approved

Identifiers
- IUPAC name: (−)-(1R,4S,5S,6S)-4-amino-2-sulfonylbicyclo[3.1.0]hexane-4,6-dicarboxylic acid
- CAS Number: 635318-11-5
- PubChem CID: 9834591
- ChemSpider: 8010312
- UNII: 531QUG7P9E
- ChEBI: CHEBI:94640
- CompTox Dashboard (EPA): DTXSID40212943

Chemical and physical data
- Formula: C_{7}H_{9}NO_{6}S
- Molar mass: 235.21 g·mol^{−1}
- 3D model (JSmol): Interactive image
- SMILES: C1[C@]([C@@H]2[C@H]([C@@H]2S1(=O)=O)C(=O)O)(C(=O)O)N
- InChI: InChI=1S/C7H9NO6S/c8-7(6(11)12)1-15(13,14)4-2(3(4)7)5(9)10/h2-4H,1,8H2,(H,9,10)(H,11,12)/t2-,3-,4+,7+/m1/s1; Key:AVDUGNCTZRCAHH-MDASVERJSA-N

Pomaglumetad (LY-404,039) is an amino acid analog drug that acts as a highly selective agonist for the metabotropic glutamate receptor group II subtypes mGluR_{2} and mGluR_{3}. Pharmacological research has focused on its potential antipsychotic and anxiolytic effects. Pomaglumetad is intended as a treatment for schizophrenia and other psychotic and anxiety disorders by modulating glutamatergic activity and reducing presynaptic release of glutamate at synapses in limbic and forebrain areas relevant to these disorders. Human studies investigating therapeutic use of pomaglumetad have focused on the prodrug pomaglumetad methionil (LY-2140023), a methionine amide of pomaglumetad since pomaglumetad exhibits low oral absorption and bioavailability in humans.

Early human trials using this prodrug form of pomaglumetad gave encouraging results. However, pharmaceutical company Eli Lilly terminated further development of the compound in 2012 after it failed in phase III clinical trials. In September 2013, the results of a randomized, placebo-controlled clinical trial investigating the impact of adjunctive pomaglumetad methionil on prominent negative symptoms in schizophrenia was published and failed to demonstrate any benefit.

In 2015, Denovo Biopharma exclusively licensed pomaglumetad methionil (the prodrug) for further development, having identified "a meaningful subset of patients who showed significantly improved outcomes".

== Pharmacology ==
=== Pharmacodynamics ===
Clinical development of pomaglumetad resulted from efforts to discover potent and selective mGluR agonists for the treatment of psychiatric disorders. Pomaglumetad is highly selective for group II metabotropic glutamate receptors mGluR_{2} and mGluR_{3}. These receptors reduce the activity of postsynaptic potentials in the cortex and act by inhibiting the release of glutamate and GABA. pomaglumetad has been shown to act as a potent full agonist at group II mGluRs as demonstrated by its ability to inhibit cyclic adenosine monophosphate, cAMP, formation as a result of stimulation by forskolin. Pomaglumetad has been shown to modulate glutamatergic activity in the limbic and forebrain areas, where group II mGlu receptors are most densely localized.

The specific binding of pomaglumetad to human cloned mGlu receptors has been found to be highest for mGluR_{2} (K_{i} = 149 ± 11 nM) and relatively high for mGluR_{3} (K_{i} = 92 ± 14 nM). Research suggests that it does not have any appreciable affinity for other metabotropic glutamate receptors, ionotropic NMDA receptors, or kainate receptors, nor does it appear to have any affinity for adrenergic, benzodiazepine/GABAergic, histaminergic or muscarinic receptors. The functional activity of pomaglumetad on mGluR receptors has been further demonstrated by investigating the drug's ability to suppress electrically stimulated excitatory postsynaptic potentials, or EPSPs. Pomaglumetad has been shown to attenuate cortically evoked EPSPs in rat striatal spiny neurons in a concentration-dependent manner, mediated by activation of mGluR_{2} and mGluR_{3} receptors. This suppressive effect of pomaglumetad on stimulated EPSPs is reversed by the use of mGluR_{2/3} antagonists, such as LY341495.

Pomaglumetad possesses partial agonist actions at D_{2} receptors and inhibits the binding of the D_{2}-specific antagonist [3H]domperidone to human cloned D_{2} receptors. It increases the release of dopamine as well as its metabolites DOPAC and HVA in the prefrontal cortex in a manner similar to the atypical antipsychotic clozapine. Pomaglumetad also appears to have some effects on serotonin. It has been shown that pomaglumetad increases serotonin turnover, increasing the ratio of 5-HIAA to 5-HT, and suppresses serotonin-induced glutamate release in the prefrontal cortex.

There is disagreement in the literature as to the possible agonistic action that pomaglumetad has on dopamine receptors. Attempts by Eli Lilly and AstraZeneca to replicate findings showing potent partial agonist action of mGluR_{2/3} agonists at D_{2} receptors were unsuccessful.

=== Novelty ===
Based on the glutamate hypothesis of schizophrenia, glutamate receptor agonists have been suggested as an effective treatment for psychotic patients. Pomaglumetad was one of the first drugs to be suggested as effective in treating psychosis without any apparent interference in dopaminergic function. Existing antipsychotic medications primarily treat schizophrenia by acting as antagonists at D2 receptors, while pomaglumetad has very low affinity for biogenic amine receptors.

Structurally, pomaglumetad is a close relative to other mGluR_{2/3} orthosteric agonists eglumetad, LY-379,268, LY-389,795, and MGS-008, all of which are members of the bicyclohexane family. Pomaglumetad was the preferred drug candidate for further development due to its antipsychotic efficacy and lack of motor coordination effects at doses up to 30 mg/kg.

== Animal studies ==
The pharmacokinetic profile of pomaglumetad has been primarily investigated in rodent models. It has shown high in vitro potency and efficacy as well as antipsychotic potential in animal studies. In overnight-fasted rats, intravenous dosing resulted in an AUC_{0-24} value of 2.9 μg*h/mL and a C_{max} value of 7.5 μg/mL. Oral administration resulted in an AUC_{0-24} value of 7.2 μg*h/mL and a C_{max} value of 4.0 μg/mL. The oral bioavailability in these rats was found to be 63%.

Pomaglumetad demonstrates similar efficacy to clozapine for the treatment of psychotic symptoms in amphetamine and PCP animal models. In both mice and rat studies, the drug demonstrates inhibition of induced hyperlocomotion and conditioned avoidance responding. Pomaglumetad has also been shown to attenuate fear-potentiated startle and reduce marble burying in rodents, predictive of anxiolytic efficacy. Use of pomaglumetad in rodent models indicates a lack of motor side effects or impairment, as determined by experiments using a rotarod. There also appear to be no sedative effects.

Animal studies and neurochemical models have also shown that use of pomaglumetad augments the efficacy of known antipsychotics, predictive of potential clinical efficacy in schizophrenia treatment. Assays of locomotion and conditioned avoidance showed evidence of synergy between pomaglumetad and antipsychotic medication, as well as an absence of motor impairment typically observed with high doses of antipsychotic medications. The combination of pomaglumetad (5 and 20 mg/kg) and risperidone (0.3 mg/kg) achieved prefrontal cortical dopamine efflux significantly higher than that observed with treatment by either drug alone.

== Pomaglumetad methionil ==
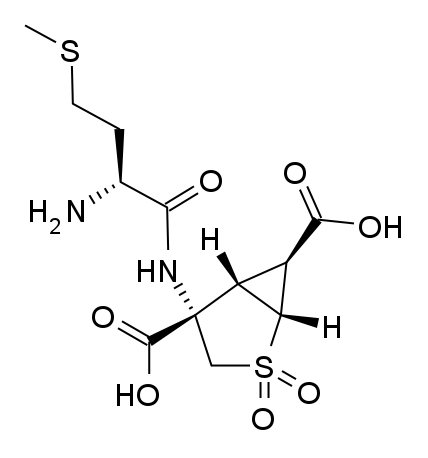
Pomaglumetad methionil, a prodrug of pomaglumetad.

Despite its apparent efficacy in animal models and in vitro, as well as its highly selective agonistic properties at mGlu_{2} and mGlu_{3} receptors, pomaglumetad displayed only 3% oral bioavailability in humans in a phase I clinical trial. A single dose of 200 mg results in an AUC value of 900 ng*h/mL. The drug's poor uptake has been cited as, in part, due to its interaction with the peptide transporter PepT 1. This led to the synthesis and development of pomaglumetad methionil (LY-2140023), an oral methionine prodrug of pomaglumetad, in 2010 for oral treatment of schizophrenia by Eli Lilly.

=== Synthesis and pharmacology ===
Pomaglumetad methionil was identified using the analogous peptide prodrug approach used previously for talaglumetad, another prodrug of eglumetad. Synthesis was the result of preparation of LY-389795 followed by oxidation to pomaglumetad and coupling with L-methionine. Pomaglumetad methionil uses a human peptide transporter and hydrolytic pathways to deliver pomaglumetad to systemic circulation in humans. It is rapidly absorbed and hydrolyzed to produce active pomaglumetad (~70% conversion), increasing its estimated bioavailability to 49%. In humans, use of pomaglumetad methionil resulted in significantly higher plasma levels of pomaglumetad compared with oral administration of LY-404039. Pomaglumetad methionil appears to be an inactive prodrug, as K_{i} values for the drug have been found to be greater than 100 μM.

=== Treatment for schizophrenia ===
Pomaglumetad methionil is the first drug acting on mGlu receptors that has been studied in humans for the treatment of schizophrenia. It has been proposed as useful treatment of both positive and negative symptoms by acting as a selective agonist at mGlu receptors and modulating glutamatergic neurotransmission. It is suspected that pomaglumetad methionil may balance and normalize dysregulated and hyperactive cortical pyramidal neurons in regions associated with schizophrenia and psychosis such as the thalamus, prefrontal cortex, and limbic system. Clinical trials using pomaglumetad methionil have investigated its use as a therapy when administered alone and as an adjuvant therapy used in addition to atypical antipsychotics.

=== Dosage and usage ===
The dosage of pomaglumetad methionil given to patients has varied by clinical trial, though dosages have typically ranged between 10 mg and 40 mg twice daily (BID). In an early phase II monotherapy trial, the dosage shown to be efficacious was 40 mg BID. Later trials investigating the use of pomaglumetad methionil as an adjuvant to the antipsychotic medications already used by patients participating in the study utilized a lower dose of 20 mg BID. If treatment was well tolerated after a week at this target dose, the dose was increased to 40 mg BID. However, if the 20 mg dose was not well tolerated, the dose was decreased to 10 mg.

=== Efficacy and clinical trials ===
In 2007, a randomized phase II clinical trial showed that pomaglumetad methionil taken twice daily for 4 weeks improved schizophrenia symptoms as measured with the PANSS and CGI-S when compared to placebo. However, post hoc analysis did not demonstrate a statistically significant difference in efficacy between pomaglumetad methionil and olanzapine (positive control) groups. The researchers on the clinical trial hypothesized that the lack of significant difference between pomaglumetad methionil and olanzapine on their outcome measures was due to incorrect dosage of pomaglumetad methionil, and that the optimal therapeutic dose was yet to be determined.

A second randomized, double-blind, placebo- and active-controlled clinical trial gave schizophrenia patients various doses (5, 20, 40, or 80 mg) of pomaglumetad methionil monohydrate twice daily, yet none of the four doses were found to be more efficacious than placebo on measures of PANSS total score. However, the results of this study were considered inconclusive because neither the LY-2140023 or the olanzapine (active control) groups demonstrated significant differences in treatment as compared to the placebo. Due to the possibility of a heightened placebo response that may have reduced the ability to detect a significant response to the drug across the pomaglumetad methionil and olanzapine groups, clinical studies of the drug's efficacy were continued.

A phase II, multicenter, randomized, parallel, active-controlled study with an open-label design was conducted in 2013 to investigate tolerability, efficacy and adverse effects of long-term treatment with pomaglumetad methionil. Patients receiving pomaglumetad methionil were compared to patients receiving other antipsychotic medications, including olanzapine, risperidone, and aripiprazole, for a 24-week treatment phase and optional 28-week extension phase. Researchers found that over the initial 6–8 weeks of treatment, the improvement on the PANSS did not differ between groups. At later time points, it was found that the groups receiving the antipsychotic medications showed significantly greater improvement than the pomaglumetad methionil group.

=== Tolerability and side effects ===
Pomaglumetad methionil has generally been found to be safe and tolerable. The most common treatment-emergent adverse effects reported with use of the drug include insomnia, nausea, headache, somnolence, affect lability and blood creatine phosphokinase increase. No clinically significant changes in vital signs or worsening of extrapyramidal symptoms were reported in association with pomaglumetad methionil use during an initial phase II clinical trial. However, a second, multicenter study reported four patients experiencing convulsions, suggesting a potential for increased risk of seizures during treatment. A long-term study found that there was no statistically significant difference in the time to discontinuation of use due to lack of tolerability between patients using pomaglumetad methionil and other antipsychotic medications.

Mild weight loss has also been associated with pomaglumetad methionil. In patients receiving 40 mg twice daily, a 0.51 kg weight reduction was observed after 4 weeks of treatment.

=== Eli Lilly stops phase III development ===
In August 2012, Eli Lilly and Company announced their decision to stop their ongoing clinical studies investigating pomaglumetad methionil as a treatment for schizophrenia after their phase II study did not meet its primary endpoint. The company completed a phase II, randomized, double-blind, placebo- and active-controlled, parallel-group-assignment, dose-ranging, inpatient, multi-center clinical trial. Patients were randomized to receive 5, 20, 40, or 80 mg of pomaglumetad methionil, placebo, or olanzapine for 28 days. Results of the clinical trial indicated that neither pomaglumetad methionil nor olanzapine were significantly more efficacious than the placebo as determined with PANSS total scores. Post hoc analyses indicated only a trend towards improvement with pomaglumetad methionil, while olanzapine was associated with a significant improvement in total PANSS total score. Of the decision to stop development, Jan Lundberg, PhD and president of Lilly Research Laboratories, said "I'm disappointed in what these results mean for patients with schizophrenia who still are searching for options to treat this terrible illness".

=== Denovo Biopharma licenses pomaglumetad methionil ===
In 2015, Denovo Biopharma exclusively licensed pomaglumetad methionil for further development, having identified "a meaningful subset of patients who showed significantly improved outcomes". Under licensing deal, Denovo gains all rights to develop, manufacture, and commercialize pomaglumetad globally, including transfer of all intellectual property and other rights, data, and information. Lilly has an option to re-acquire pomaglumetad upon a successful clinical trial, for predetermined but undisclosed financial terms.

== See also ==
- Pomaglumetad methionil
- Eglumetad and talaglumetad
- List of investigational antipsychotics
