= PHCCC =

Chemical compound

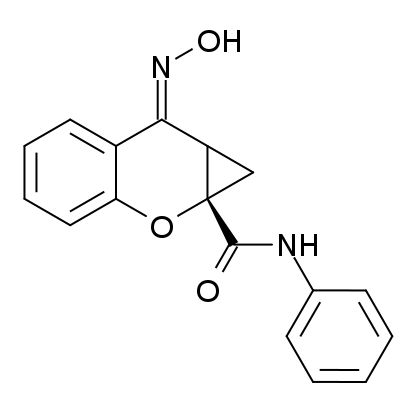

Identifiers
- IUPAC name: (−)-N-Phenyl-7-(hydroxyimino)cyclopropa[b]chromen-1a-carboxamide
- CAS Number: 179068-02-1
- PubChem CID: 3579925
- ChemSpider: 2816644
- UNII: 875PGG7NBA

Chemical and physical data
- Formula: C_{17}H_{14}N_{2}O_{3}
- Molar mass: 294.310 g·mol^{−1}
- 3D model (JSmol): Interactive image
- SMILES: c4ccccc4NC(=O)C1(CC1C2=NO)Oc3ccccc23
- InChI: InChI=1S/C17H14N2O3/c20-16(18-11-6-2-1-3-7-11)17-10-13(17)15(19-21)12-8-4-5-9-14(12)22-17/h1-9,13,21H,10H2,(H,18,20); Key:FPXPIEZPAXSELW-UHFFFAOYSA-N

PHCCC is a research drug which acts as a glutamate receptor ligand, particularly being a positive allosteric modulator at the mGluR_{4} subtype, as well as an agonist at mGluR_{6}. It has anxiolytic effects in animal studies. PHCCC and similar drugs have been suggested as novel treatments for Parkinson's disease.

== See also ==
- CPCCOEt
