= Metabotropic glutamate receptor 4 =

Mammalian protein found in humans

GRM4

Identifiers
- Aliases: GRM4, GPRC1D, MGLUR4, mGluR4, glutamate metabotropic receptor 4
- External IDs: OMIM: 604100; MGI: 1351341; GeneCards: GRM4

Gene location (Human)
Chr.	Chromosome 6 (human)
Band	6p21.31	Start	34,018,643 bp
Band	6p21.31	End	34,155,622 bp

Gene location (Mouse)
Chr.	Chromosome 17 (mouse)
Band	17|17 A3.3	Start	27,641,361 bp
Band	17|17 A3.3	End	27,740,377 bp
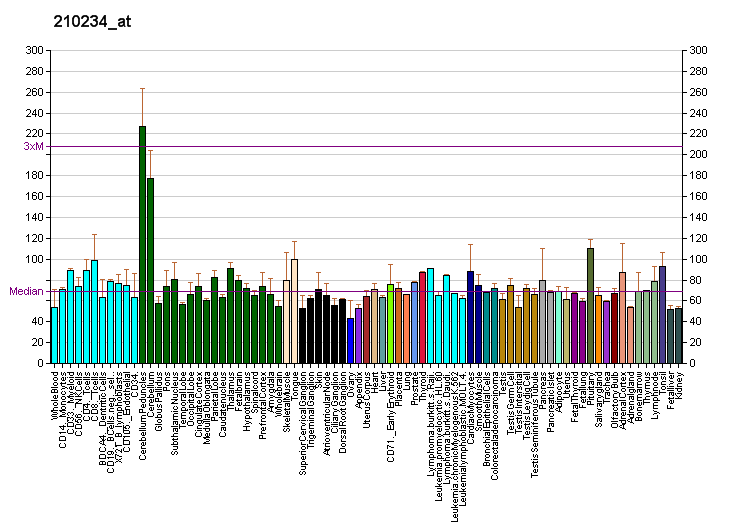
RNA expression pattern
Bgee	Human / Mouse (ortholog); Top expressed in: paraflocculus of cerebellum; right hemisphere of cerebellum; cerebellar vermis; nucleus accumbens; putamen; caudate nucleus; Brodmann area 10; middle frontal gyrus; islet of Langerhans; quadriceps femoris muscle / Top expressed in: cerebellar cortex; cerebellar vermis; lobe of cerebellum; zygote; secondary oocyte; medial dorsal nucleus; primary oocyte; medial geniculate nucleus; olfactory tubercle; nucleus of stria terminalis; More reference expression data
BioGPS	More reference expression data
Gene ontology
Molecular function	glutamate receptor activity; G protein-coupled receptor activity; signal transducer activity
Cellular component	integral component of membrane; plasma membrane; integral component of plasma membrane; intracellular anatomical structure; presynaptic membrane; cytoplasmic vesicle; membrane
Biological process	regulation of neuron apoptotic process; adenylate cyclase-inhibiting G protein-coupled glutamate receptor signaling pathway; neurotransmitter secretion; positive regulation of MAPK cascade; signal transduction; chemical synaptic transmission; regulation of synaptic transmission, glutamatergic; G protein-coupled receptor signaling pathway; G protein-coupled glutamate receptor signaling pathway
Sources:Amigo / QuickGO
Orthologs
Databases	NCBI: entry; OMA: entry
Species	Human	Mouse
Entrez	2914	268934
Ensembl	ENSG00000124493	ENSMUSG00000063239
UniProt	Q14833	Q68EF4
RefSeq (mRNA)	NM_000841; NM_001256809; NM_001256810; NM_001256811; NM_001256812 NM_001256813; NM_001256814; NM_001282847	NM_001013385; NM_001291045; NM_001360192; NM_001379317
RefSeq (protein)	NP_000832; NP_001243738; NP_001243740; NP_001243741; NP_001243742 NP_001269776	NP_001013403; NP_001277974; NP_001347121
Location (UCSC)	Chr 6: 34.02 – 34.16 Mb	Chr 17: 27.64 – 27.74 Mb
PubMed search
- Wikidata
View/Edit Human	View/Edit Mouse

Metabotropic glutamate receptor 4 is a protein that in humans is encoded by the GRM4 gene.

Together with GRM6, GRM7 and GRM8 it belongs to group III of the metabotropic glutamate receptor family. Group III receptors are linked to the inhibition of the cyclic AMP cascade. Activation of GRM4 has potential therapeutic benefits in the treatment of parkinson's disease. Splice variant "taste-GRM4" is involved in the perception of umami taste.

== Ligands ==
=== Orthosteric ===
- Cinnabarinic acid, a tryptophan metabolite
- LSP1-2111: agonist
- LSP4-2022: agonist
- LSP2-9166: mixed agonist at mGluR_{4} and mGluR_{7}

=== Positive allosteric modulators (PAMs) ===
- ADX88178
- Foliglurax (PXT-002331, DT-1687)
- Tricyclic thiazolopyrazole derivative 22a: EC_{50} = 9 nM, E_{max} = 120%
- ML-128: EC_{50} = 240 nM, E_{max} = 182%
- Valiglurax (AP-472) (VU0652957)
- VU-0418506
- VU-001171: EC_{50} = 650 nM, E_{max} = 141%, 36-fold shift
- VU0155041: subtype-selective PAM, intrinsic allosteric agonist activity, robust in-vivo activity
- VU0364770
- PHCCC: PAM of mGluR4, negative allosteric modulator of mGluR1, direct agonist at mGluR6
- TC-N 22A
