= Eglumetad =

Chemical compound

Clinical data
- Other names: Eglumegad; LY-354740; LY354740
- ATC code: none

Identifiers
- IUPAC name: (1S,2S,5R,6S)-2-Aminobicyclo[3.1.0]hexane-2,6-dicarboxylic acid
- CAS Number: 176199-48-7
- PubChem CID: 213056
- IUPHAR/BPS: 1393
- ChemSpider: 184747
- UNII: ONU5A67T2S
- CompTox Dashboard (EPA): DTXSID40170094

Chemical and physical data
- Formula: C_{8}H_{11}NO_{4}
- Molar mass: 185.179 g·mol^{−1}
- 3D model (JSmol): Interactive image
- SMILES: O=C(O)[C@H]1[C@]2([H])CC[C@](C(O)=O)(N)[C@@]21[H]
- InChI: InChI=1S/C8H11NO4/c9-8(7(12)13)2-1-3-4(5(3)8)6(10)11/h3-5H,1-2,9H2,(H,10,11)(H,12,13)/t3-,4-,5-,8-/m0/s1; Key:VTAARTQTOOYTES-RGDLXGNYSA-N

Eglumetad (INN), also known as eglumegad and by its developmental code name LY-354740, is a research drug developed by Eli Lilly and Company, which is being investigated for its potential in the treatment of anxiety and drug addiction. It is a glutamate derived compound and its mode of action implies a novel mechanism.

== Mechanism of action ==
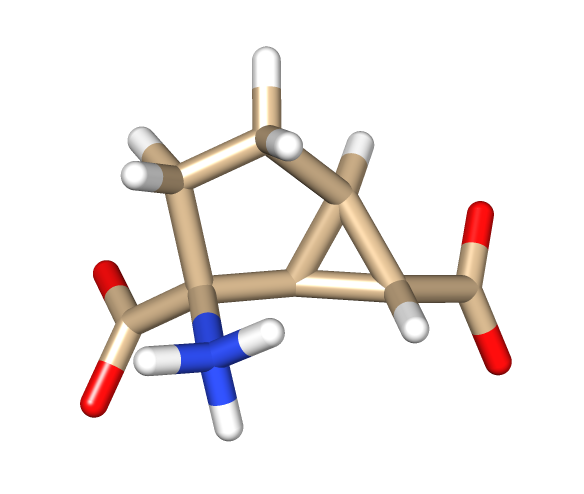
Eglumetad in a mGlu2 receptor bound conformation

Eglumetad acts as a group-selective agonist for the group II metabotropic glutamate receptors (mGluR_{2}_{/}_{3}). It is unclear whether eglumetad directly interacts with dopamine D_{2} receptors.

== Effects ==
In experiments on mice, eglumetad was found to be as effective as diazepam for treating anxiety symptoms in several standard tests, but without producing any of the negative side effects of diazepam such as sedation and memory impairment. Tests in humans confirmed that it produced anxiolytic effects without producing sedation. However it did slightly reduce cognitive performance in tests on monkeys.

Eglumetad has also been found to be effective in relieving the symptoms of withdrawal from chronic use of both nicotine and morphine in animals, as well as inhibiting the development of tolerance to morphine, raising hope that this drug may be useful for treating drug addiction in humans.

Eglumetad and related drugs are neuroprotective and are synergistic with the neuroprotection produced by N-Methyl-D-aspartic acid (NMDA) antagonist drugs, which may make these drugs useful in aiding recovery from brain injury.

This class of drugs also interacts with hallucinogenic drugs, with eglumetad reducing the effects of 5-HT_{2A} agonist hallucinogens, while conversely the mGluR_{2/3} antagonist LY341495 increased the behavioural effects of these drugs. This suggests that mGluR_{2/3} agonists such as eglumetad may have potential uses in the treatment of some forms of psychosis, although eglumetad had only limited effects on the action of the dissociative drug phencyclidine which is generally a better model for schizophrenia than the 5-HT_{2A} agonist hallucinogens.

Eglumetad also interferes in the hypothalamic–pituitary–adrenal axis, with chronic oral administration of this drug leading to markedly reduced baseline cortisol levels in Bonnet macaques; acute infusion of eglumetad resulted in a marked diminution of yohimbine-induced stress response in those animals.

In human adrenocortical cells, eglumetad has been shown to down-regulate intracellular cyclic AMP (cAMP) and steroidogenesis, with a significant decrease in aldosterone and cortisol production.

== Clinical development ==
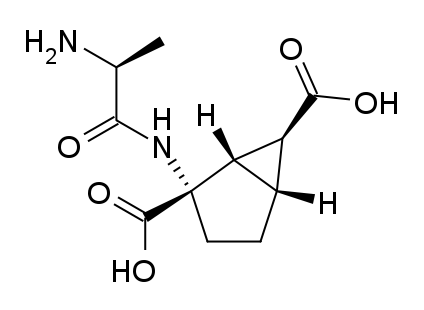
Talaglumetad (LY-544,344), a prodrug of eglumetad.

Development of this drug and related compounds is continuing, with several clinical trials completed and more planned. Poor oral bioavailability of the original formulation led to limited efficacy in the initial human trials, and so the prodrug form talaglumetad (LY-544344) did seem to be a more likely drug candidate for further development. However a clinical trial of talaglumetad was discontinued early based on findings of convulsions in preclinical studies.

== See also ==
- List of investigational antipsychotics
- Pomaglumetad
- Pomaglumetad methionil
- DCG-IV
- HYDIA
