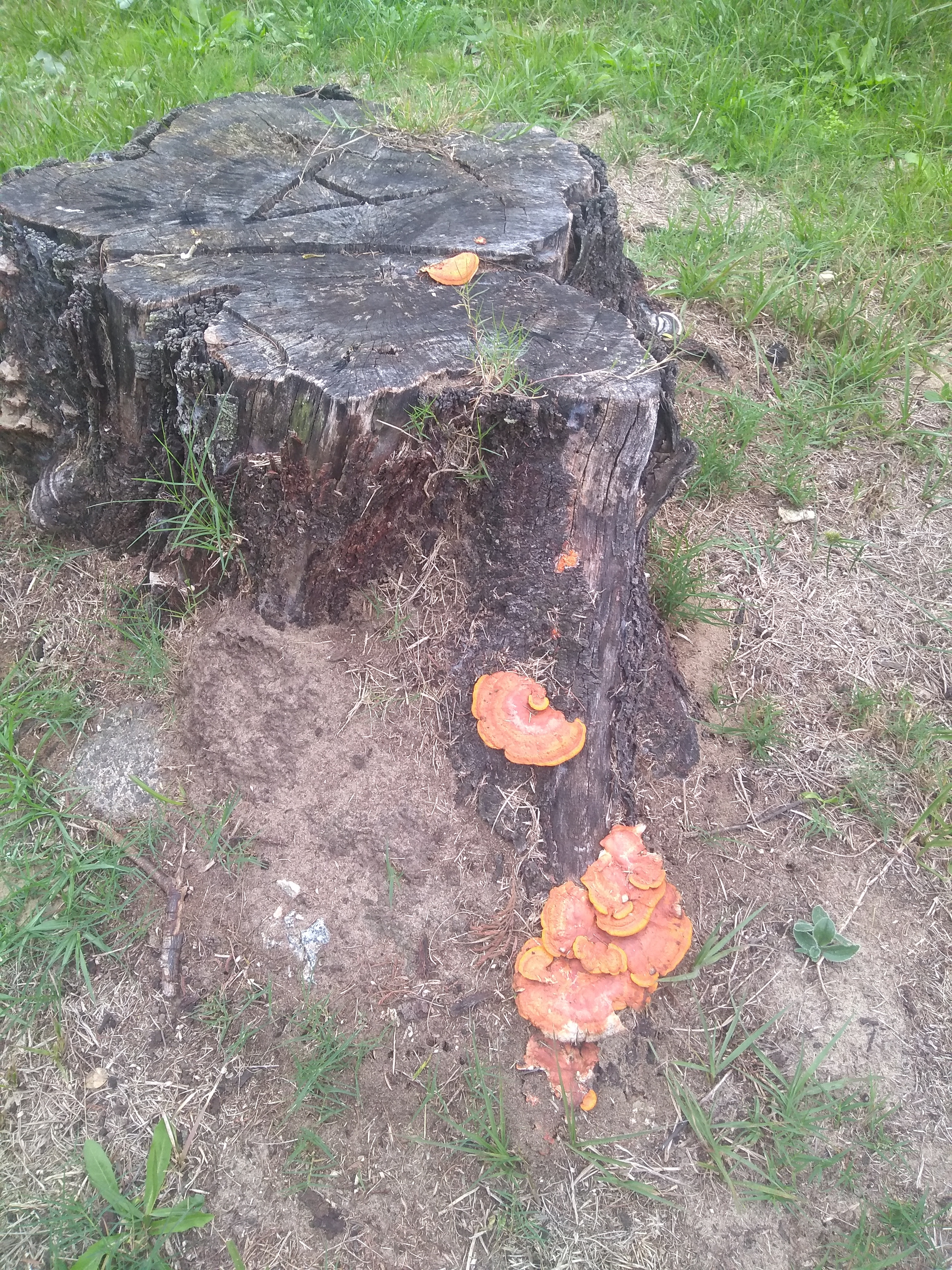

Scientific classification
- Kingdom: Fungi
- Division: Basidiomycota
- Class: Agaricomycetes
- Order: Polyporales
- Family: Polyporaceae
- Genus: Pycnoporus
- Species: P. sanguineus

Binomial name
- Pycnoporus sanguineus (L.) Murrill (1904)

Synonyms
- Boletus ruber Lam. (1783); Boletus sanguineus L. (1763); Coriolus sanguineus (L.) G.Cunn. (1949); Fabisporus sanguineus (L.) Zmitr. (2001); Microporus sanguineus (L.) Pat. (1900); Polyporus sanguineus (L.) Fr. (1821); Polystictus sanguineus (L.) G.Mey. (1818); Trametes cinnabarina var. sanguinea (L.) Pilát (1936); Trametes sanguinea (L.) Imazeki (1943); Trametes sanguinea (L.) Lloyd (1924)

= Pycnoporus sanguineus =

Species of fungus

Pycnoporus sanguineus
- Mycological characteristics
- Pores on hymenium
- Cap is convex
- Hymenium is decurrent
- Stipe is bare
- Spore print is white
- Ecology is saprotrophic or parasitic
- Edibility is inedible

Pycnoporus sanguineus is a white rot saprobic fungus. It was discovered on Guana Island (part of the Virgin Islands) but occurs throughout the tropics and subtropics, usually growing on dead hardwoods. It grows in the form of a thin dry conk with a lateral attachment to its substrate, or sometimes a very short stipe. The cap is orange-red to orange, lightening to salmon/buff in age. It has concentric zonation, and is finely tomentose to nearly glabrous. The pores on the underside are round, measuring 5-6 per mm with tubes up to 2mm deep. It is inedible due to its tough texture.

It is also a tree pathogen infecting species of Platanus and Mangifera.

== Description ==
Pycnoporus sanguineus is used for both industrial and medicinal purposes throughout the world. A pigment extracted from the caps called cinnabarin is used in textile industries for the partial and complete de-colorization of certain dyes. Other industrial uses of this species include testing methods for wood treatment products and enzymes used in bio-remediation for the breakdown of crude oils. Traditional medicinal uses were first utilized by natives in surrounding areas of this species. Medicinal uses of P. sanguineus help relieve symptoms of the following diseases: arthritis, gout, styptic, sore throats, ulcers, tooth aches, fevers, and hemorrhages. P. sanguineus also displays numerous anti-bacterial properties against E. coli, K. pneumoniae, P. aeruginosa, S. typhi, and S. aureus by inhibiting specific metabolic pathways. Currently, P. sanguineus is being used in medicine for the absorption of certain heavy metals contained within the blood stream.
