= MMPIP =

Chemical compound

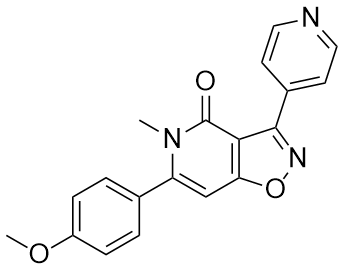
- Two-dimensional molecular structure

Identifiers
- IUPAC name: 6-(4-methoxyphenyl)-5-methyl-3-pyridin-4-ylisoxazolo[4,5-c]pyridin-4(5H)-one
- CAS Number: 479077-02-6
- PubChem CID: 9945530
- IUPHAR/BPS: 3341
- ChemSpider: 8121142
- ChEMBL: ChEMBL593489
- CompTox Dashboard (EPA): DTXSID90433202

Chemical and physical data
- Formula: C_{19}H_{15}N_{3}O_{3}
- Molar mass: 333.347 g·mol^{−1}
- 3D model (JSmol): Interactive image
- SMILES: COc3ccc(cc3)C2CC(C1C(=O)N2C)ON=C1c4ccncc4

MMPIP is a drug used in scientific research that acts as a selective antagonist for the metabotropic glutamate receptor subtype mGluR_{7}. This receptor subtype appears to be involved in the downstream response to cocaine in the brain.
