= Tremella rubromaculata =

Scientific classification
- Kingdom: Fungi
- Division: Basidiomycota
- Class: Tremellomycetes
- Order: Tremellales
- Family: Tremellaceae
- Genus: Tremella
- Species: T. rubromaculata

Binomial name
- Tremella rubromaculata Lowy (1964)

Species of fungus

Tremella rubromaculata is a species of fungus in the family Tremellaceae. It produces reddish orange, lobed, gelatinous basidiocarps (fruit bodies) and is parasitic on other fungi on dead branches of broad-leaved trees. It was originally described from Guatemala.

== Taxonomy ==
Tremella rubromaculata was first published in 1964 by American mycologist Bernard Lowy based on a collection made in Guatemala.

== Description ==
Fruit bodies are gelatinous, bright reddish orange, up to 2.5 cm (1 in) across, and lobed. Microscopically, the basidia are tremelloid (ellipsoid, with oblique to vertical septa), 4-celled, 17 to 21 by 8 to 11 μm. The basidiospores are ellipsoid, smooth, 8 to 10.5 by 6 to 8 μm.

== Similar species ==
Tremella dysenterica, described from Brazil, is bi-coloured (yellow and reddish orange) and similarly lobed to subfrondose, but has smaller basidia and smaller spores (5.5 to 8.5 by 4 to 5.5 μm). Elsewhere, Tremella erythrina is similarly coloured, but only known from China.

== Habitat and distribution ==
Tremella rubromaculata is a parasite on lignicolous fungi, but its host species is unknown. It is found on dead, attached or fallen branches of broad-leaved trees.

The species was described from Guatemala and has also been reported from Brazil and Mexico.
