= Metabotropic glutamate receptor 7 =

Mammalian protein found in humans

GRM7
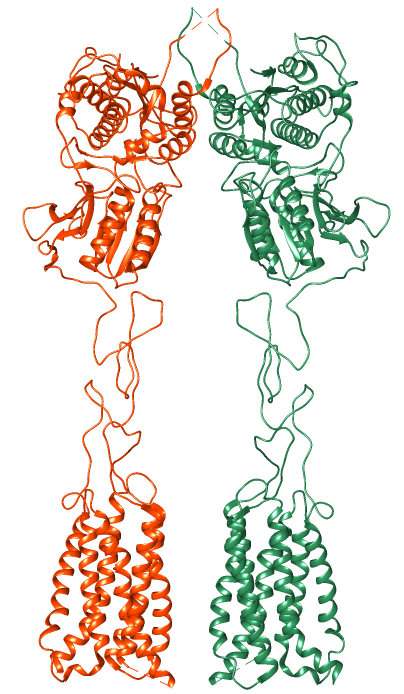

Identifiers
- Aliases: GRM7, GLUR7, GPRC1G, MGLU7, MGLUR7, PPP1R87, glutamate metabotropic receptor 7, NEDSHBA
- External IDs: OMIM: 604101; MGI: 1351344; GeneCards: GRM7
Available structures
PDB	Ortholog search: PDBe RCSB
PDB	List of PDB id codes 3MQ4, 5C5C

Gene location (Human)
Chr.	Chromosome 3 (human)
Band	3p26.1	Start	6,770,001 bp
Band	3p26.1	End	7,741,533 bp

Gene location (Mouse)
Chr.	Chromosome 6 (mouse)
Band	6|6 E3	Start	110,622,542 bp
Band	6|6 E3	End	111,544,191 bp
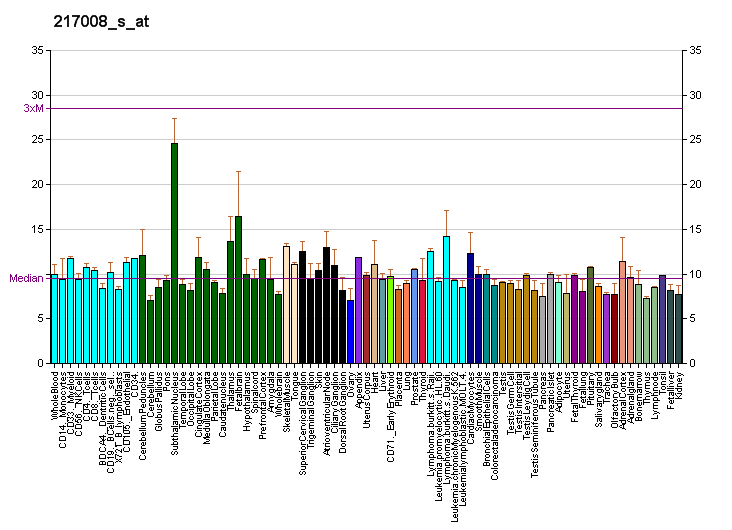
RNA expression pattern
Bgee	Human / Mouse (ortholog); Top expressed in: endothelial cell; middle temporal gyrus; Region I of hippocampus proper; Brodmann area 23; entorhinal cortex; olfactory zone of nasal mucosa; sperm; orbitofrontal cortex; dorsolateral prefrontal cortex; Brodmann area 9 / Top expressed in: medial dorsal nucleus; superior colliculus; mammillary body; olfactory tubercle; medial geniculate nucleus; piriform cortex; subiculum; ventromedial nucleus; substantia nigra; nucleus accumbens; More reference expression data
BioGPS	More reference expression data
Gene ontology
Molecular function	glutamate receptor activity; calcium ion binding; PDZ domain binding; serine binding; G protein-coupled receptor activity; group III metabotropic glutamate receptor activity; adenylate cyclase inhibitor activity; signal transducer activity; glutamate binding; calcium channel regulator activity
Cellular component	integral component of membrane; postsynaptic membrane; membrane; receptor complex; plasma membrane; integral component of plasma membrane; dendritic shaft; presynaptic active zone; axon; dendrite; cell cortex; asymmetric synapse; presynaptic membrane
Biological process	negative regulation of glutamate secretion; response to stimulus; hearing; behavioral fear response; adenylate cyclase-inhibiting G protein-coupled glutamate receptor signaling pathway; signal transduction; regulation of cyclase activity; regulation of synaptic transmission, glutamatergic; chemical synaptic transmission; G protein-coupled receptor signaling pathway; adenylate cyclase-inhibiting G protein-coupled receptor signaling pathway; G protein-coupled glutamate receptor signaling pathway
Sources:Amigo / QuickGO
Orthologs
Databases	NCBI: entry; OMA: entry
Species	Human	Mouse
Entrez	2917	108073
Ensembl	ENSG00000196277	ENSMUSG00000056755
UniProt	Q14831	Q68ED2
RefSeq (mRNA)	NM_000844; NM_181874; NM_181875	NM_177328; NM_001346640; NM_177970
RefSeq (protein)	NP_000835; NP_870989	NP_001333569; NP_796302
Location (UCSC)	Chr 3: 6.77 – 7.74 Mb	Chr 6: 110.62 – 111.54 Mb
PubMed search
- Wikidata
View/Edit Human	View/Edit Mouse

Metabotropic glutamate receptor 7 is a protein that in humans is encoded by the GRM7 gene.

== Function ==
L-glutamate is the major excitatory neurotransmitter in the central nervous system and activates both ionotropic and metabotropic glutamate receptors. Glutamatergic neurotransmission is involved in most aspects of normal brain function and can be perturbed in many neuropathologic conditions. The metabotropic glutamate receptors are a family of G protein-coupled receptors, that have been divided into 3 groups on the basis of sequence homology, putative signal transduction mechanisms, and pharmacologic properties. Group I includes GRM1 and GRM5 and these receptors have been shown to activate phospholipase C. Group II includes GRM2 and GRM3 while Group III includes GRM4, GRM6, GRM7 and GRM8. Group II and III receptors are linked to the inhibition of the cyclic AMP cascade but differ in their agonist selectivities. Alternative splice variants of GRM8 have been described but their full-length nature has not been determined.

Glutamate has lower affinity for mGluR7 than the other metabotropic glutamate receptors and it has been suggested that mGluR7 may have a regulatory role to dampen the effects of excessive glutamate levels.

== Ligands ==
=== Agonists ===
- AMN082: allosteric agonist; induces rapid internalization; non-glutamatergic binding component
- LSP2-9166: mixed agonist at mGluR_{4} and mGluR_{7}

=== Antagonists ===
- MMPIP: allosteric antagonist/inverse agonist
- XAP044

=== Negative allosteric modulators ===
- ADX71743

== Interactions ==
Metabotropic glutamate receptor 7 has been shown to interact with PICK1.

== Clinical ==
Mutations in both copies have been associated with developmental and epileptic encephalopathy, microcephaly, hypomyelination and cerebral atrophy.
