= HYDIA =

Chemical compound

Identifiers
- IUPAC name: (1S,2R,3R,5R,6S)-2-amino-3-hydroxybicyclo[3.1.0]hexane-2,6-dicarboxylic acid
- CAS Number: 259134-85-5
- PubChem CID: 9794223
- ChemSpider: 7969990
- CompTox Dashboard (EPA): DTXSID501028622

Chemical and physical data
- Formula: C_{8}H_{11}NO_{5}
- Molar mass: 201.178 g·mol^{−1}
- 3D model (JSmol): Interactive image
- SMILES: C1[C@H]2[C@@H]([C@H]2[C@@]([C@@H]1O)(C(=O)O)N)C(=O)O
- InChI: InChI=1S/C8H11NO5/c9-8(7(13)14)3(10)1-2-4(5(2)8)6(11)12/h2-5,10H,1,9H2,(H,11,12)(H,13,14)/t2-,3+,4-,5-,8-/m0/s1; Key:NTPXNEQCDPWJQA-AZDHXYLBSA-N

HYDIA is a drug that is used in neuroscience research, which acts as a potent and selective antagonist for the group II metabotropic glutamate receptors (mGluR_{2/3}). It has been useful in the mapping of the group II mGluR receptor proteins and their molecular modeling. HYDIA is similar in structure to group II mGluR agonists such as eglumetad and pomaglumetad, but the addition of the 3-hydroxy group reverses the activity to a competitive antagonist. Other derivatives such as the 3-benzyloxy ether are more potent antagonists than HYDIA itself.
