= CPCCOEt =

Chemical compound

Identifiers
- IUPAC name: (−)-ethyl (7E)-7-hydroxyimino-1,7a-dihydrocyclopropa[b]chromene-1a-carboxylate
- CAS Number: 179067-99-3
- PubChem CID: 6278000
- IUPHAR/BPS: 1382
- ChemSpider: 23214736
- ChEBI: CHEBI:91562
- ChEMBL: ChEMBL337583

Chemical and physical data
- Formula: C_{13}H_{13}NO_{4}
- Molar mass: 247.250 g·mol^{−1}
- 3D model (JSmol): Interactive image
- SMILES: CCOC(=O)[C@]12CC1/C(=N\O)c1ccccc1O2
- InChI: InChI=1S/C13H13NO4/c1-2-17-12(15)13-7-9(13)11(14-16)8-5-3-4-6-10(8)18-13/h3-6,9,16H,2,7H2,1H3/b14-11-/t9?,13-/m0/s1; Key:FXCTZFMSAHZQTR-ZBUQWEBQSA-N

CPCCOEt is a drug used in scientific research, which acts as a non-competitive antagonist at the metabotropic glutamate receptor subtype mGluR_{1}, with high selectivity although only moderate binding affinity. It is used mainly in basic research into the function of the mGluR_{1} receptor, including the study of behavioural effects in animals including effects on memory and addiction.

== See also ==
- PHCCC
