= Tremella dysenterica =

Scientific classification
- Kingdom: Fungi
- Division: Basidiomycota
- Class: Tremellomycetes
- Order: Tremellales
- Family: Tremellaceae
- Genus: Tremella
- Species: T. dysenterica

Binomial name
- Tremella dysenterica Möller (1895)

Species of fungus

Tremella dysenterica is a species of fungus in the family Tremellaceae. It produces bright yellow, red-spotted, lobed to subfrondose, gelatinous basidiocarps (fruit bodies) and is parasitic on other fungi on dead branches of broad-leaved trees. It was originally described from Brazil and has been recorded elsewhere in the neotropics and in Africa.

== Taxonomy ==
Tremella dysenterica was first published in 1895 by German mycologist Alfred Möller based on a collection made in Brazil.

== Description ==
Fruit bodies are gelatinous, bright watery-yellow to deep yellow with orange to scarlet spots and streaks, up to 4 cm (1.5 in) across, and lobed to weakly frondose. Microscopically, the basidia are tremelloid (ellipsoid, with oblique to vertical septa), 4-celled, 14 to 18 by 8 to 12 μm. The basidiospores are ellipsoid, smooth, 5.5 to 8.5 by 4 to 5.5 μm.

== Similar species ==
Tremella rubromaculata, described from Guatemala without reference to T. dysenterica, appears macroscopically very similar but differs microscopically in having larger basidiospores (8 to 10.5 by 6 to 8 μm) and basidia.

== Habitat and distribution ==
Tremella dysenterica is a parasite on lignicolous fungi, but its host species is unknown, though collections have been noted on pyrenomycetes. It is found on dead, attached or fallen branches of broad-leaved trees.

The species is currently known from Brazil, Belize, and Cameroon.
