= Metabotropic glutamate receptor 3 =

Mammalian protein found in humans

GRM3
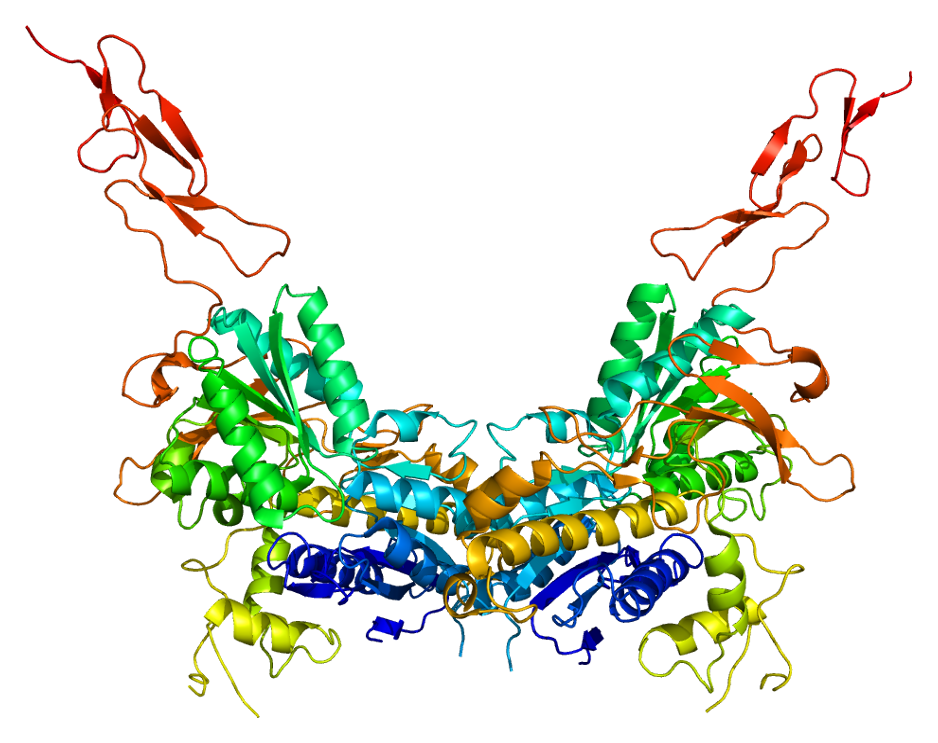
Available structures
PDB	Ortholog search: PDBe RCSB
PDB	List of PDB id codes 3SM9, 4XAR, 5CNK, 5CNM

Identifiers
- Aliases: GRM3, GLUR3, GPRC1C, MGLUR3, mGlu3, glutamate metabotropic receptor 3
- External IDs: OMIM: 601115; MGI: 1351340; HomoloGene: 651; GeneCards: GRM3; OMA:GRM3 - orthologs

Gene location (Human)
Chr.	Chromosome 7 (human)
Band	7q21.11-q21.12	Start	86,643,909 bp
Band	7q21.11-q21.12	End	86,864,879 bp
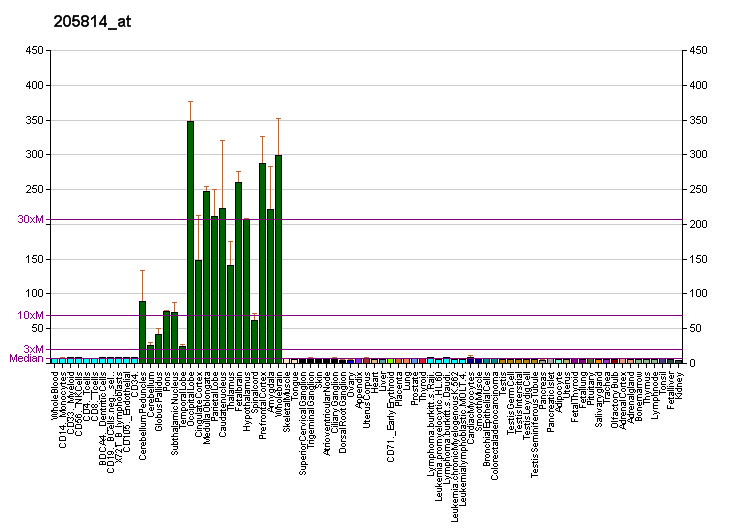
RNA expression pattern
Bgee	Human / Mouse (ortholog); Top expressed in: endothelial cell; middle frontal gyrus; buccal mucosa cell; corpus callosum; Brodmann area 46; inferior ganglion of vagus nerve; Brodmann area 10; putamen; orbitofrontal cortex; Region I of hippocampus proper / n/a; More reference expression data
BioGPS	More reference expression data
Gene ontology
Molecular function	glutamate receptor activity; group II metabotropic glutamate receptor activity; calcium channel regulator activity; signal transducer activity; G protein-coupled receptor activity
Cellular component	integral component of membrane; axon; neuron projection; dendritic spine; postsynaptic membrane; integral component of plasma membrane; postsynaptic density; membrane; plasma membrane; presynaptic membrane; glutamatergic synapse; integral component of postsynaptic membrane; integral component of presynaptic membrane
Biological process	negative regulation of adenylate cyclase activity; signal transduction; chemical synaptic transmission; regulation of synaptic transmission, glutamatergic; adenylate cyclase-inhibiting G protein-coupled glutamate receptor signaling pathway; G protein-coupled glutamate receptor signaling pathway; G protein-coupled receptor signaling pathway
Sources:Amigo / QuickGO
Orthologs
Species	Human	Mouse
Entrez	2913	108069
Ensembl	ENSG00000198822	ENSMUSG00000003974
UniProt	Q14832	Q9QYS2
RefSeq (mRNA)	NM_000840; NM_001363522	NM_181850
RefSeq (protein)	NP_000831; NP_001350451	NP_862898
Location (UCSC)	Chr 7: 86.64 – 86.86 Mb	n/a
PubMed search
- Wikidata
View/Edit Human	View/Edit Mouse

Metabotropic glutamate receptor 3 (mGluR3) is an inhibitory G_{i}/G_{0}-coupled G-protein coupled receptor (GPCR) generally localized to presynaptic sites of neurons in classical circuits. However, in higher cortical circuits in primates, mGluR3 are localized post-synaptically, where they strengthen rather than weaken synaptic connectivity. In humans, mGluR3 is encoded by the GRM3 gene. Deficits in mGluR3 signaling have been linked to impaired cognition in humans, and to increased risk of schizophrenia, consistent with their expanding role in cortical evolution.

== Structure ==
In humans, mGluR3 is encoded by the GRM3 gene on chromosome 7. At least five protein-coding isoforms are predicted based on genomic information. The mGluR3 protein is a seven-pass transmembrane protein.

== Function ==
L-glutamate is the major excitatory neurotransmitter in the central nervous system and activates both ionotropic and metabotropic glutamate receptors. Glutamatergic neurotransmission is involved in most aspects of normal brain function and can be perturbed in many neuropathologic conditions. The metabotropic glutamate receptors are a family of G protein-coupled receptors, that have been divided into 3 groups on the basis of sequence homology, putative signal transduction mechanisms, and pharmacologic properties. Group I includes GRM1 and GRM5 and these receptors have been shown to activate phospholipase C. Group II includes GRM2 and GRM3 while Group III includes GRM4, GRM6, GRM7 and GRM8. Group II and III receptors are linked to the inhibition of the cyclic AMP cascade but differ in their agonist selectivities.

mGluR3 assumes an expanded role in the primate association cortex, where it supports higher cognitive functions. In rodents, mGluR3 are located primarily at presynaptic terminals, where they inhibit glutamate release. By contrast, in the primate prefrontal cortex and entorhinal cortex, mGluR3 are predominantly postsynaptic, residing on dendritic spines where they regulate the cAMP-driven activation of calcium signaling.

Feedforward cAMP–calcium signaling can open nearby potassium channels, reducing synaptic efficacy and impairing cognition—a phenomenon termed dynamic network connectivity. mGluR3 counteract this process by closing potassium channels and thereby strengthening the functional connectivity of prefrontal cortical networks. In addition to responding to glutamate, mGluR3 are also activated by N-acetylaspartylglutamic acid (NAAG), which is co-released with glutamate but selectively stimulates mGluR3. Levels of NAAG in the cerebrospinal fluid correlate with cognitive performance. During neuroinflammation, the enzyme glutamate carboxypeptidase II (GCPII) degrades NAAG, thereby impairing prefrontal cortical cognitive function. A gain-of-function variant in the gene encoding GCPII has been linked to cognitive impairment in humans.

== Clinical significance ==
The mGluR3 receptor encoded by the GRM3 gene has been found to be associated with a range of psychiatric disorders, including bipolar affective disorder as well as schizophrenia.

A mutation in the Kozak sequence in the 1st exon of the GRM3 gene was shown to change translation and transcription of cloned GRM3 gene constructs and was significantly associated with bipolar disorder with an odds ratio of 4.4. Subsequently, a marker in GRM3 was implicated in a large genome-wide association study of schizophrenia with statistical significance of p<10^{−9}. A follow-up study of the Kozak sequence variant showed that it was associated with increased risk of bipolar disorder, schizophrenia and alcoholism. The mGluR3 receptor encoded by GRM3 is targetable by several drugs that have been used in previous trials of schizophrenia and anxiety disorder. The agonist, antagonist and allosteric modulator drugs of mGluR3 can now be explored as new treatments for mental illness. Other scientific evidence has been published which shows that the well established anti-manic drug lithium carbonate also changes GRM3 gene expression in the mouse brain after treatment with lithium carbonate.

== Ligands ==
mGluR3 modulators that are significantly selective over the isoform mGluR2 are known since 2013.

=== Agonists ===
- with a bicyclo[3.1.0]hexane skeleton
  - MGS-0028
  - LY404040
  - LY379268
  - LY354740; its (+)-C4α-methyl analog is a GluR2 agonist / GluR3 antagonist
  - LY-2794193
- (R)-2-amino-4-(4-hydroxy[1,2,5]thiadiazol-3-yl)butyric acid

=== Antagonists ===
- CECXG – 38x selectivity for mGlu_{3} over mGlu_{2}
- LY-341,495 and its 1-fluoro analog: potent orthosteric antagonists
- MGS-0039, HYDIA (both with bicyclo[3.1.0]hexane skeleton)

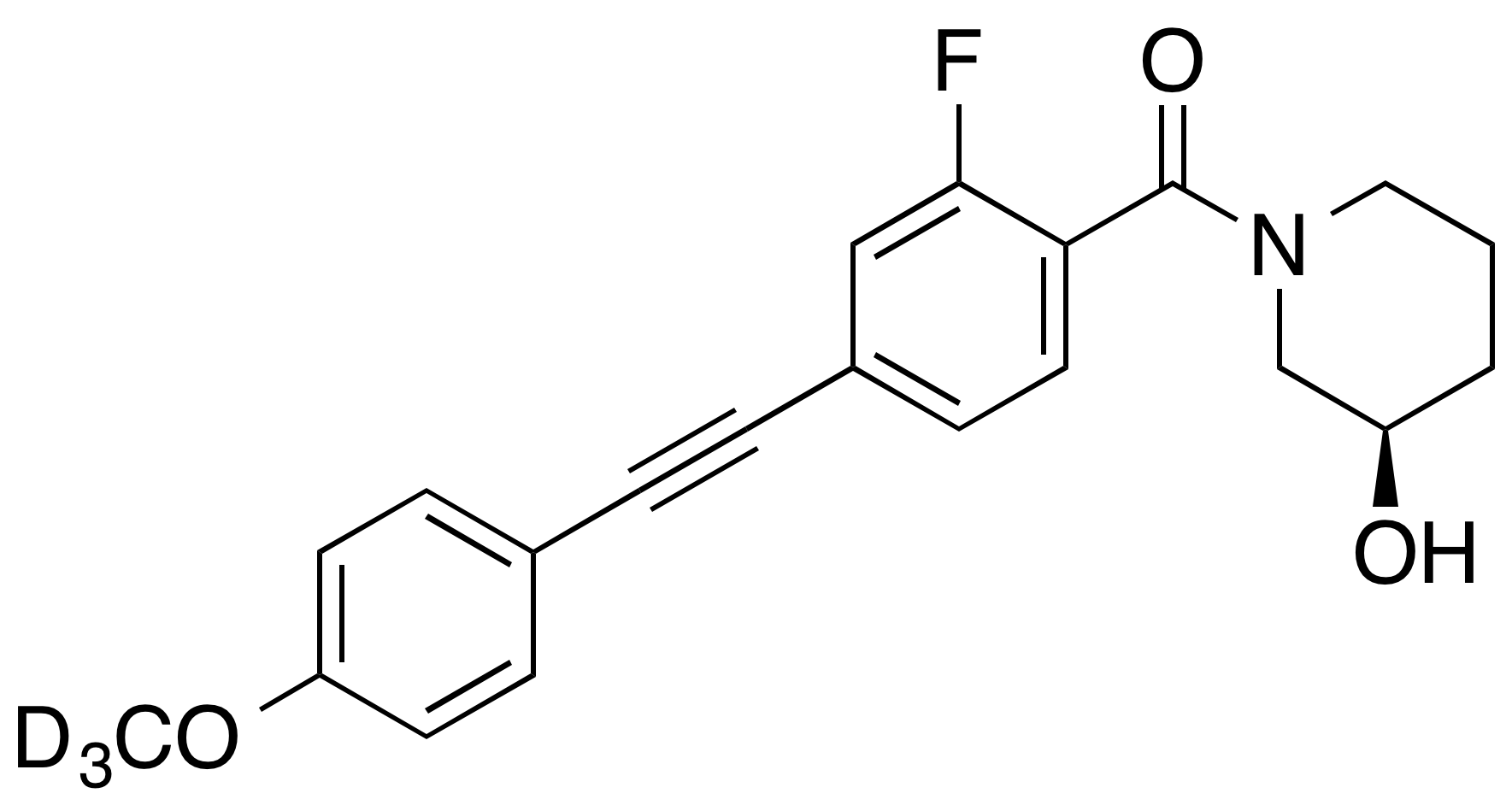
D_{3}-ML337

=== Allosteric modulators ===
- ML337: selective NAM, IC50 = 450 nM for mGluR3, IC50 >30μM for mGluR2
- MNI-137: inhibitor
- VU-0650786: NAM
- compound 7p: non-competitive antagonist (presumably allosteric inhibitor)
- LY 2389575: negative allosteric modulator.

== Interactions ==
Metabotropic glutamate receptor 3 has been shown to interact with:

- GRIP1,
- PICK1, and
- PPM1A.
- Raptin

== See also ==
- Metabotropic glutamate receptor
