= Remeglurant =

Chemical compound

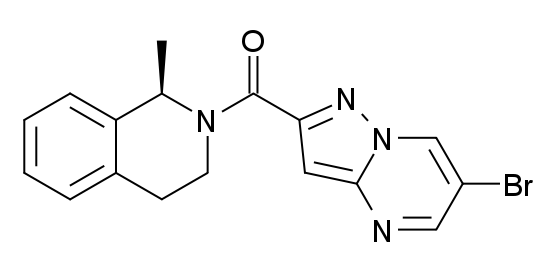

Clinical data
- Other names: MRZ-8456
- ATC code: None

Identifiers
- IUPAC name: (6-Bromopyrazolo[1,5-a]pyrimidin-2-yl)[(1R)-1-methyl-3,4-dihydro-2(1H)-isoquinolinyl]methanone
- CAS Number: 1309783-00-3
- PubChem CID: 24810684
- ChemSpider: 32701693
- UNII: Y7H8880HMD
- CompTox Dashboard (EPA): DTXSID501032318

Chemical and physical data
- Formula: C_{17}H_{15}BrN_{4}O
- Molar mass: 371.238 g·mol^{−1}
- 3D model (JSmol): Interactive image
- SMILES: C[C@@H]1c2ccccc2CCN1C(=O)c3cc4ncc(cn4n3)Br
- InChI: InChI=1S/C17H15BrN4O/c1-11-14-5-3-2-4-12(14)6-7-21(11)17(23)15-8-16-19-9-13(18)10-22(16)20-15/h2-5,8-11H,6-7H2,1H3/t11-/m1/s1; Key:TUYZYSNXXSTKQX-LLVKDONJSA-N

Remeglurant (INN; developmental code name MRZ-8456) is a drug which acts as a selective antagonist of the mGlu_{5} receptor. It is under development by Merz Pharmaceuticals for the treatment of drug-induced dyskinesia but no development has been reported since at least 2016.

== See also ==
- Basimglurant
- Dipraglurant
- Fenobam
- Mavoglurant
- Raseglurant
