= GRN-529 =

Chemical compound

Identifiers
- IUPAC name: (4-(Difluoromethoxy)-3-(pyridin-2-ylethynyl)phenyl)(5H-pyrrolo[3,4-b]pyridin-6(7H)-yl)methanone
- CAS Number: 1253291-12-1
- PubChem CID: 59548652
- IUPHAR/BPS: 6428
- ChemSpider: 27471591
- UNII: D77QDV7E9J
- CompTox Dashboard (EPA): DTXSID501030348

Chemical and physical data
- Formula: C_{22}H_{15}F_{2}N_{3}O_{2}
- Molar mass: 391.378 g·mol^{−1}
- 3D model (JSmol): Interactive image
- SMILES: O=C(N1CC(C=CC=N2)=C2C1)C3=CC(C#CC4=CC=CC=N4)=C(OC(F)F)C=C3
- InChI: InChI=1S/C22H15F2N3O2/c23-22(24)29-20-9-7-16(12-15(20)6-8-18-5-1-2-10-25-18)21(28)27-13-17-4-3-11-26-19(17)14-27/h1-5,7,9-12,22H,13-14H2; Key:JITMSIRHBAVREW-UHFFFAOYSA-N

GRN-529 is a drug that was developed by Wyeth as a negative allosteric modulator of the metabotropic glutamate receptor 5 (mGluR5).

A study conducted by Pfizer found that GRN-529 reduced repetitive behaviors without sedation and partially increased sociability in mouse models of autism.

Another study conducted by Pfizer found a therapeutically relevant effect in animal models of depression. It is theorized to work by reducing glutamate receptor hyperactivity.

== See also ==
- Fenobam
- MPEP
- MTEP
