= C8H9NO2 =

The molecular formula C_{8}H_{9}NO_{2} may refer to:

- Aminomethylbenzoic acid
- Benzyl carbamate
- Hydroxydanaidal
- Metacetamol
- Methyl anthranilate
- N-Phenylglycine
- Phenylglycine
- Paracetamol
