= CTEP =

Chemical compound

Identifiers
- IUPAC name: 2-chloro-4-[2-[2,5-dimethyl-1-[4-(trifluoromethoxy)phenyl]imidazol-4-yl]ethynyl]pyridine
- CAS Number: 871362-31-1
- PubChem CID: 11646823
- IUPHAR/BPS: 6409
- ChemSpider: 9821562
- UNII: E3BWG5775S
- CompTox Dashboard (EPA): DTXSID50469986

Chemical and physical data
- Formula: C_{19}H_{13}ClF_{3}N_{3}O
- Molar mass: 391.78 g·mol^{−1}
- 3D model (JSmol): Interactive image; Interactive image
- SMILES: Clc2cc(ccn2)C#Cc1nc(C)n(c1C)-c(cc3)ccc3OC(F)(F)F; FC(F)(F)Oc3ccc(n2c(c(C#Cc1ccnc(Cl)c1)nc2C)C)cc3
- InChI: InChI=1S/C19H13ClF3N3O/c1-12-17(8-3-14-9-10-24-18(20)11-14)25-13(2)26(12)15-4-6-16(7-5-15)27-19(21,22)23/h4-7,9-11H,1-2H3; Key:GOHCTCOGYKAJLZ-UHFFFAOYSA-N

CTEP (Ro4956371) is a research drug developed by Hoffmann-La Roche that acts as a selective allosteric antagonist of the metabotropic glutamate receptor subtype mGluR_{5}, binding with nanomolar affinity and over 1000 times selectivity over all other receptor targets tested. In animal studies it was found to have a high oral bioavailability and a long duration of action, lasting 18 hours after a single dose, giving it considerably improved properties over older mGluR_{5} antagonists such as MPEP, MTEP and fenobam.
