= ADX-47273 =

Chemical compound

Identifiers
- IUPAC name: (S)-(4-fluorophenyl)-(3-[3-(4-fluoro-phenyl)-[1,2,4]-oxadiazol-5-yl]piperidin-1-yl)methanone
- CAS Number: 851881-60-2 851881-59-9 (R isomer), 837413-22-6 (racemate)
- PubChem CID: 11383075
- IUPHAR/BPS: 1420
- ChemSpider: 9557988
- UNII: 4C4P7L0W63
- ChEMBL: ChEMBL381055
- CompTox Dashboard (EPA): DTXSID80234386

Chemical and physical data
- Formula: C_{20}H_{17}F_{2}N_{3}O_{2}
- Molar mass: 369.372 g·mol^{−1}
- 3D model (JSmol): Interactive image
- SMILES: FC1=CC=C(C(N2CCC[C@@H](C2)C3=NC(C4=CC=C(F)C=C4)=NO3)=O)C=C1
- InChI: InChI=1S/C20H17F2N3O2/c21-16-7-3-13(4-8-16)18-23-19(27-24-18)15-2-1-11-25(12-15)20(26)14-5-9-17(22)10-6-14/h3-10,15H,1-2,11-12H2/t15-/m0/s1; Key:VXQCCZHCFBHTTD-HNNXBMFYSA-N

ADX-47273 is a research pharmaceutical developed by Addex Therapeutics which acts as a positive allosteric modulator (PAM) selective for the metabotropic glutamate receptor subtype mGluR_{5}. It has nootropic and antipsychotic effects in animal studies, and has been used as a lead compound to develop improved derivatives.

== See also ==
- Dipraglurant
- Raseglurant
