= MFZ 10-7 =

Chemical compound

Identifiers
- IUPAC name: 3-Fluoro-5-((6-methylpyridin-2-yl)ethynyl)benzonitrile
- CAS Number: 1224431-15-5
- ChemSpider: 26334163
- UNII: FV36HKQ9RA
- ChEMBL: ChEMBL1784608
- CompTox Dashboard (EPA): DTXSID501336029

Chemical and physical data
- Formula: C_{15}H_{9}FN_{2}
- Molar mass: 236.244
- 3D model (JSmol): Interactive image
- SMILES: Cc1cccc(n1)C#Cc2cc(cc(c2)F)C#N
- InChI: InChI=1S/C15H9FN2/c1-11-3-2-4-15(18-11)6-5-12-7-13(10-17)9-14(16)8-12/h2-4,7-9H,1H3; Key:ZGEXQIMQZVRTDZ-UHFFFAOYSA-N

MFZ 10-7 (3-fluoro-5-((6-methylpyridin-2-yl)ethynyl)benzonitrile) is a drug with potential applications in the treatment of addiction, which acts as a negative allosteric modulator of the metabotropic glutamate receptor subtype 5 (mGluR5). Others of the kind, namely MPEP and MTEP, are not considered to have translational potential for human use due to off-target effects and short half-lives. Drugs of this kind have been used to offset craving for drugs of abuse such as cocaine in in vivo animal administration models.

== See also ==
- Fenobam
- CTEP
