= Amdiglurax =

BDNF-modulating drug for depression and PTSD

Clinical data
- Other names: NSI-189; NSI189; NeuralStem Inc 189; ALTO-100; ALTO100
- Routes of administration: Oral
- Drug class: Hippocampal neurogenesis/neuroplasticity stimulant; Indirect brain-derived neurotrophic factor modulator
- ATC code: None

Legal status
- Legal status: US: Investigational New Drug

Pharmacokinetic data
- Elimination half-life: 17.4–20.5 hours

Identifiers
- IUPAC name: (4-Benzylpiperazin-1-yl)-[2-(3-methylbutylamino)pyridin-3-yl]methanone
- CAS Number: 1270138-40-3 1270138-41-4 (phosphate)
- PubChem CID: 50922681
- DrugBank: DB16230
- ChemSpider: 32701740
- UNII: YVE9U408ZL
- ChEBI: CHEBI:228696
- ChEMBL: ChEMBL4302505
- CompTox Dashboard (EPA): DTXSID901025668

Chemical and physical data
- Formula: C_{22}H_{30}N_{4}O
- Molar mass: 366.509 g·mol^{−1}
- 3D model (JSmol): Interactive image
- SMILES: CC(C)CCNC1=C(C=CC=N1)C(=O)N2CCN(CC2)CC3=CC=CC=C3
- InChI: InChI=1S/C22H30N4O/c1-18(2)10-12-24-21-20(9-6-11-23-21)22(27)26-15-13-25(14-16-26)17-19-7-4-3-5-8-19/h3-9,11,18H,10,12-17H2,1-2H3,(H,23,24); Key:DYTOQURYRYYNOR-UHFFFAOYSA-N

Amdiglurax (INN), also known by its former developmental code names ALTO-100 and NSI-189 (short for "NeuralStem Inc. 189"), is a drug described as a hippocampal neurogenesis stimulant and indirect brain-derived neurotrophic factor (BDNF) modulator which is under development for the treatment of major depressive disorder (MDD), bipolar depression, and post-traumatic stress disorder (PTSD). There has also been interest in amdiglurax for possible treatment of cognitive impairment and neurodegeneration. It is taken orally.

Amdiglurax's exact mechanism of action is unknown. However, it has been disclosed to act as a highly potent agonist of the TLX. On the other hand, its developer disclosed amdiglurax to act as a dual agonist and positive allosteric modulator ("ago-PAM") of the metabotropic glutamate mGlu_{5} receptor and attributed its antidepressant-like effects to this action. The drug is thought to work through indirectly enhancing BDNF signaling and increasing neuroplasticity and neurogenesis in the hippocampus. It dose-dependently increases hippocampal volume at sufficiently high doses in rodents. However, the drug did not significantly affect hippocampal volume at the assessed doses in humans in a clinical study. Amdiglurax is a first-in-class drug and a small molecule.

As of July 2024, amdiglurax is in phase 2 clinical trials for MDD, bipolar depression, and PTSD. A phase 3 trial for MDD is being planned. Findings of the effectiveness of amdiglurax in treating MDD in phase 1 and 2 trials have been mixed, although cognitive and memory improvements have been observed. Amdiglurax is under development by Alto Neuroscience and was previously under development by Neuralstem, Inc. It has been sold online as a nootropic and antidepressant.

== Pharmacology ==
=== Pharmacodynamics ===
Depression is associated with atrophy of the hippocampus, reduced hippocampal neurogenesis, and smaller hippocampal volumes. Major mechanisms thought to contribute to these changes include prolonged exposure to stress (in part mediated by increased hippocampal glucocorticoid signaling), environmental deprivation, and physical inactivity, among others. Reduced hippocampal volume is associated with more severe depressive symptoms, repeated depressive episodes, longer durations of depressive episodes, earlier onset of depression, and early-life adversity, among other factors. The hippocampus is a key structure for memory, and reduced hippocampal volumes in people with depression have been associated with cognitive and memory impairments. Antidepressant therapy has been associated with reversal of hippocampal atrophy, and hippocampal neurogenesis could be essential in recovery from depression. These changes may be mediated by increased hippocampal brain-derived neurotrophic factor (BDNF) signaling. The hippocampus is known to project to and regulate the mesolimbic dopamine reward pathway, among other areas, and dysregulation of this pathway could be involved in the anhedonia and amotivation seen in people with depression. On the basis of the preceding findings, enhancing hippocampal neurogenesis has been of interest for possible pharmaceutical treatment of depression.

Amdiglurax was identified through a neurogenesis functional screen in vitro with a library of 10,269 compounds. It has been found to enhance hippocampal neuroplasticity and neurogenesis in multiple preclinical models. In addition, the drug dose-dependently increases hippocampal volume in mice. In one study, there was an approximate 36% increase at 10 mg/kg and an approximate 66% increase at 30 mg/kg. There appears to be a bell-shaped dose–response curve, with 100 mg/kg being less effective than 30 mg/kg in stimulating hippocampal volume. The morphological effects of amdiglurax are confined to the dentate gyrus of the hippocampus and the subventricular zone (SVZ) and there are no known morphological effects elsewhere in the brain. It is unknown whether the hippocampal volume increase exclusively represents neurogenesis or also includes neuropil augmentation.

The exact mechanism of action or biological target of amdiglurax is unknown. Amdiglurax does not interact with any monoamine transporters, monoamine receptors, or amino acid targets (e.g., the NMDA receptor or the AMPA receptor). Screening against 52 neurotransmitter-related receptors, ion channels, and enzymes and screening against 900 kinases was negative. Amdiglurax is said to work in part through indirectly modulating BDNF and its signaling. It has also been found to upregulate glial-derived neurotrophic factor (GDNF), vascular endothelial growth factor (VEGF), and Skp, Cullin, F-box (SCF) in vitro, with more robust effects on BDNF and SCF than on VEGF or GDNF. Amdiglurax has been found to increase signaling of the tropomyosin receptor kinase B (TrkB) pathway, and antibodies against BDNF and SCF have been found to oppose effects of amdiglurax in preclinical models.

A 2022 patent disclosed that NSI-189 is a highly potent agonist of the nuclear receptor TLX (NR2E1), with a reported EC_{50} of 36.1 pM (0.0361 nM) in an ALPHA assay. This receptor is known to be a master regulator of hippocampal neurogenesis in the brain. Previously an orphan receptor, the TLX is now known to have the fatty acid oleic acid as an endogenous agonist. Oleic acid is peripherally selective, necessitating the use of synthetic drugs to act on this receptor for potential medical applications. On the other hand, its developer disclosed amdiglurax to act as a dual agonist and positive allosteric modulator of the metabotropic glutamate mGlu_{5} receptor and attributed its antidepressant-like effects to this action in a 2026 patent.

In a small phase 1 clinical study, amdiglurax (40–150 mg/day) for 4 weeks had no impact on hippocampal or amygdalar volume measured by magnetic resonance imaging (MRI) in people with major depressive disorder. There was a modest numerical increase in left hippocampal volume (b=0.35), but it was not statistically significant (p=0.12). The doses of amdiglurax used in humans are lower than those that have been found to increase hippocampal volume in some studies in mice although not in other studies. Despite the preceding, although no antidepressant effect over placebo was apparent in a phase 2 study, amdiglurax nonetheless produced significant cognitive and memory improvements in the study. The mixed effectiveness of amdiglurax in treating depression but its apparent cognitive benefits in clinical studies has been interpreted as suggesting that reduced hippocampal volumes are more associated with cognitive alterations in depression rather than with the mood effects of depression.

=== Pharmacokinetics ===
Amdiglurax is orally active and is administered orally in the form of tablets. Peak levels of amdiglurax are reached 1 to 2 hours after administration. Area-under-the-curve levels of amdiglurax increase linearly across a dosing range of 40 mg one to three times per day (i.e., 40–120 mg/day). Steady state levels of amdiglurax are reached within 4 to 5 days. The elimination half-life of amdiglurax has ranged from 17.4 to 20.5 hours in a few different clinical studies.

Unpublished in vitro studies of amdiglurax have shown limited metabolism to oxidized and glucuronidated products.

== Chemistry ==
Amdiglurax is a small molecule and benzylpiperazine-aminopyridine compound.

== History ==
Amdiglurax was first described by 2010. Early development of amdiglurax was supported by the Defense Advanced Research Projects Agency (DARPA) and the National Institutes of Health (NIH).

== Clinical development ==
=== By neuralstem, inc. ===
NSI-189 completed a phase I clinical trial for MDD in 2011, where it was administered to 41 healthy volunteers. A phase Ib clinical trial for treating MDD in 24 patients started in 2012 and completed in July 2014, with results published in December 2015.

In July 2017, it was announced that a phase II clinical trial with 220 patients failed to meet its primary effectiveness endpoint (MADRS) in MDD. However, statistically significant improvements have been reported on a number of secondary depression and cognition endpoints. Upon the announcement of the unsuccessful trial, Neuralstem stock plummeted by 61%. More detailed analysis of the trial results was released in December 2017 and January 2018. It revealed statistically significant improvements on patient-reported depression scales and in aspects of cognition for the 40 mg/day dose. Of particular note are improvements in memory (effect size Cohen's d = 1.12, p = 0.002), working memory (d = 0.81, p = 0.020), and executive functioning (d = 0.66, p = 0.048) as measured by the CogScreen computerized test.

In August 2020 another phase 2 study with 220 participants was done. An 80 mg dose of NSI-189 showed significant benefit over placebo in the subgroup of patients who were moderately depressed (MADRS < 30) but was not significant in patients who were severely depressed (MADRS ≥ 30). The study concluded that NSI-189 is effective as a safe adjunctive therapy, with the most significant antidepressant and pro-cognitive benefits noted in patients with moderate depression.

In addition to MDD, Neuralstem had said that it has intended to pursue clinical development of NSI-189 for a variety of other neurological conditions, including traumatic brain injury, Alzheimer's disease, post-traumatic stress disorder, stroke, and to prevent cognitive and memory decline in aging.

=== By alto neuroscience ===
In 2021, Neuralstem merged with another company to become Palisade Bio, who in 2021 sold NSI-189 to an unknown buyer for up to $4.9 million. In 2024, it was revealed that this buyer was Alto Neuroscience, which is now developing NSI-189 under the new developmental code name ALTO-100.

Preliminary effectiveness of amdiglurax in the treatment of MDD has been demonstrated in new phase 2 trials. A significantly larger improvement in depressive symptoms (~46%) was observed in patients with a cognitive biomarker compared to patients without the biomarker profile in phase 2 studies published in 2023. This cognitive biomarker was determined by a web-based memory test.

Other drugs under development by Alto Neuroscience as of August 2024 include ALTO-203 (histamine H_{3} receptor inverse agonist), ALTO-300 (agomelatine reformulation—melatonin MT_{1} and MT_{2} receptor agonist and serotonin 5-HT_{2C} receptor antagonist), and ALTO-202 (NR2B subunit-containing NMDA receptor antagonist). As with amdiglurax, they are all under development for treatment of major depressive disorder.

== Research ==
NSI-189 was additionally under development by Neuralstem for treatment of a variety of conditions besides major depressive disorder, including Alzheimer's disease, Angelman syndrome, brain injuries, cognition disorders, diabetic neuropathy, neurodegenerative disorders, post-traumatic stress disorder (PTSD), stroke, and diabetes, but no recent development has been reported for these indications as of September 2022.

Amdiglurax is being developed by Alto Neuroscience exclusively for treatment of major depressive disorder, bipolar depression, and post-traumatic stress disorder as of July 2024. In May 2026, development for major depressive disorder, PTSD, Alzheimer's disease, and other indications was discontinued, with the only remaining active indication being bipolar depression. Amdiglurax is in phase 2 trials for bipolar depression as of this date.

== See also ==
- List of investigational antidepressants
- List of investigational bipolar disorder drugs
- List of investigational cognition and memory disorder drugs
- List of investigational post-traumatic stress disorder drugs
