= Raseglurant =

Chemical compound

Clinical data
- ATC code: None

Identifiers
- IUPAC name: 2-[(3-Fluorophenyl)ethynyl]-4,6-dimethyl-3-pyridinamine
- CAS Number: 757950-09-7
- PubChem CID: 10331863
- ChemSpider: 8507323
- UNII: 66UCJ8Z8L1
- CompTox Dashboard (EPA): DTXSID40226707

Chemical and physical data
- Formula: C_{15}H_{13}FN_{2}
- Molar mass: 240.281 g·mol^{−1}
- 3D model (JSmol): Interactive image
- SMILES: Fc2cccc(C#Cc1nc(cc(c1N)C)C)c2
- InChI: InChI=1S/C15H13FN2/c1-10-8-11(2)18-14(15(10)17)7-6-12-4-3-5-13(16)9-12/h3-5,8-9H,17H2,1-2H3; Key:MEDCLNYIYBERKO-UHFFFAOYSA-N

Raseglurant (INN; development code ADX-10059) is a negative allosteric modulator of the mGlu_{5} receptor and derivative of MPEP which was under development by Addex Therapeutics for the treatment of migraine, gastroesophageal reflux disease, and dental anxiety. It reached phase II clinical trials for all of the aforementioned indications before being discontinued due to the observation of possible predictive signs of hepatotoxicity in patients with long-term use.

== See also ==
- List of investigational Parkinson's disease drugs
- Basimglurant
- Dipraglurant
- Fenobam
- Mavoglurant
