= GET-73 =

Antialcohol treatment

Identifiers
- IUPAC name: 4-methoxy-N-[[4-(trifluoromethyl)phenyl]methyl]butanamide
- CAS Number: 202402-01-5
- PubChem CID: 10221200
- PubChem SID: 8396692
- DrugBank: DB12928
- ChemSpider: 8396692
- UNII: U5CLZ223FH
- KEGG: D84113
- ChEMBL: ChEMBL4297543
- ECHA InfoCard: 100.232.073

Chemical and physical data
- Formula: C_{13}H_{16}F_{3}NO_{2}
- Molar mass: 275.271 g·mol^{−1}
- 3D model (JSmol): Interactive image
- SMILES: COCCCC(=O)NCC1=CC=C(C=C1)C(F)(F)F
- InChI: InChI=InChI=1S/C13H16F3NO2/c1-19-8-2-3-12(18)17-9-10-4-6-11(7-5-10)13(14,15)16/h4-7H,2-3,8-9H2,1H3,(H,17,18); Key:QLZOWJNFLXSDSH-UHFFFAOYSA-N

GET 73 is an investigational new drug, developed by Laboratorio Farmaceutico CT SRL, that is being evaluated for treating alcohol use disorder (AUD). It acts as a negative allosteric modulator (NAM) of the metabotropic glutamate receptor 5 (mGluR5), a receptor system implicated in the neurobiology of addiction and alcohol-related behaviors.

Preclinical studies indicate that GET 73 reduces voluntary alcohol intake, diminishes the alcohol deprivation effect, and demonstrates neuroprotective properties against alcohol-induced neurotoxicity in animal models. It has also been evaluated in early-phase human trials for safety and potential efficacy in reducing alcohol craving and consumption.

GET 73 is a more structurally complex analog of GHB.
