= Dipraglurant =

Chemical compound

Clinical data
- Other names: ADX-48621
- ATC code: None

Identifiers
- IUPAC name: 6-Fluoro-2-[4-(2-pyridinyl)-3-butyn-1-yl]imidazo[1,2-a]pyridine
- CAS Number: 872363-17-2
- PubChem CID: 44557636
- ChemSpider: 25069676
- UNII: CV8JZR21A1
- CompTox Dashboard (EPA): DTXSID90236230

Chemical and physical data
- Formula: C_{16}H_{12}FN_{3}
- Molar mass: 265.291 g·mol^{−1}
- 3D model (JSmol): Interactive image
- SMILES: c1ccnc(c1)C#CCCc2cn3cc(ccc3n2)F
- InChI: InChI=1S/C16H12FN3/c17-13-8-9-16-19-15(12-20(16)11-13)7-2-1-5-14-6-3-4-10-18-14/h3-4,6,8-12H,2,7H2; Key:LZXMUJCJAWVHPZ-UHFFFAOYSA-N

Dipraglurant (INN; development code ADX-48621) is a negative allosteric modulator of the mGlu_{5} receptor which is under development by Addex Therapeutics for the treatment of Parkinson's disease levodopa-induced dyskinesia (PD-LID). As of 2014, it is in phase II clinical trials for this indication. Addex Therapeutics is also investigating an extended-release formulation of dipraglurant for the treatment of non-parkinsonian dystonia.

== See also ==
- Basimglurant
- Fenobam
- Mavoglurant
- Raseglurant
