= Oleic acid =

18-Carbon monounsaturated fatty acid

- Oleic acid

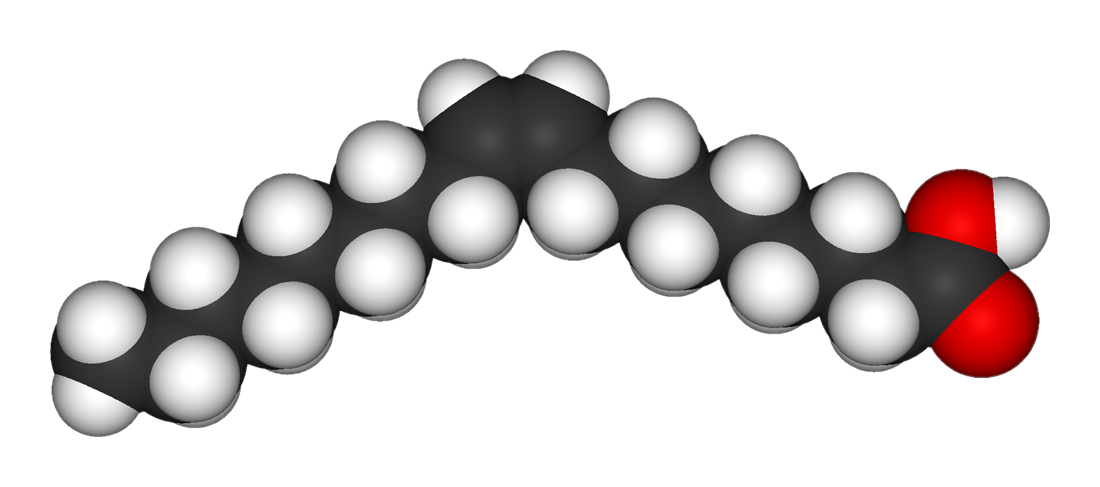

Names
- Preferred IUPAC name (Z)-octadec-9-enoic acid
- Other names Oleic acid (9Z)-Octadecenoic acid (Z)-Octadec-9-enoic acid cis-9-Octadecenoic acid cis-Δ^{9}-Octadecenoic acid 18:1 cis-9 (Lipid numbers)

Identifiers
CAS Number	112-80-1
3D model (JSmol)	Interactive image
ChEMBL	ChEMBL8659
ChemSpider	393217
DrugBank	DB04224
ECHA InfoCard	100.003.643
IUPHAR/BPS	1054
PubChem CID	445639
UNII	2UMI9U37CP
CompTox Dashboard (EPA)	DTXSID1025809
- InChI: InChI=1S/C18H34O2/c1-2-3-4-5-6-7-8-9-10-11-12-13-14-15-16-17-18(19)20/h9-10H,2-8,11-17H2,1H3,(H,19,20)/b10-9- Key: ZQPPMHVWECSIRJ-KTKRTIGZSA-N; InChI=1/C18H34O2/c1-2-3-4-5-6-7-8-9-10-11-12-13-14-15-16-17-18(19)20/h9-10H,2-8,11-17H2,1H3,(H,19,20)/b10-9- Key: ZQPPMHVWECSIRJ-KTKRTIGZBB
- SMILES: CCCCCCCC\C=C/CCCCCCCC(O)=O

Properties
Chemical formula	C_{18}H_{34}O_{2}
Molar mass	282.468 g·mol^{−1}
Appearance	colorless oily liquid with lard-like odor
Density	0.895 g/mL
Melting point	13 to 14 °C (55 to 57 °F; 286 to 287 K)
Boiling point	360 °C (680 °F; 633 K)
Solubility in water	Insoluble
Solubility in ethanol	Soluble
Magnetic susceptibility (χ)	−208.5·10^{−6} cm^{3}/mol

Hazards
- GHS labelling
Pictograms	(GHS07: Exclamation mark)
Signal word	Warning
Hazard statements	H315, H319
Precautionary statements	P264, P264+P265, P280, P302+P352, P305+P351+P338, P321, P332+P317, P337+P317, P362+P364
NFPA 704 (fire diamond)	1 1 0
Flash point	189 °C (372 °F; 462 K) (closed cup)
Autoignition temperature	363 °C (685 °F; 636 K)

Related compounds
Related compounds	Elaidic acid
- Except where otherwise noted, data are given for materials in their standard state (at 25 °C [77 °F], 100 kPa). verify (what is ?) Infobox references

Oleic acid is a fatty acid that occurs naturally in various animal and vegetable fats and oils. It is an odorless, colorless oil, although commercial samples may be yellowish due to the presence of impurities. In chemical terms, oleic acid is classified as a monounsaturated omega-9 fatty acid, abbreviated with a lipid number of 18:1 cis-9, and a main product of Δ9-desaturase. It has the formula CH_{3}−(CH_{2})_{7}−CH=CH−(CH_{2})_{7}−COOH. The name derives from the Latin word oleum, which means oil. It is the most common fatty acid in nature. The salts and esters of oleic acid are called oleates. It is a common component of oils, and thus occurs in many types of food, as well as in soap.

== Occurrence ==
Fatty acids (or their salts) often do not occur as such in biological systems. Instead fatty acids such as oleic acid occur as their esters, commonly triglycerides, which are the greasy materials in many natural oils. Oleic acid is the most common monounsaturated fatty acid in nature. It is found in fats (triglycerides), the phospholipids that make membranes, cholesteryl esters, and wax esters.

Triglycerides of oleic acid comprise the majority of olive oil (about 70%). It also makes up 59–75% of pecan oil, 61% of canola oil, 36–67% of peanut oil, 60% of macadamia oil, 20–80% of sunflower oil, 15–20% of grape seed oil, sea buckthorn oil, 40% of sesame oil, and 14% of poppyseed oil. High oleic variants of plant sources such as sunflower (~80%) and canola oil (70%) also have been developed. It is abundantly present in many animal fats, constituting 37 to 56% of chicken and turkey fat, and 44 to 47% of lard.

Oleic acid is the most abundant fatty acid in human adipose tissue, and second in abundance in human tissues overall, following palmitic acid.

Free oleic acid occurs in oils and fats as a product of the breakdown of triglycerides. Olive oil exceeding 2% free oleic acid is graded unfit for human consumption. See Fatty acid § Free fatty acids. Some ants use it as a chemical signal.

== Production and chemical behavior ==
The biosynthesis of oleic acid involves the action of the enzyme stearoyl-CoA 9-desaturase acting on stearoyl-CoA. In effect, stearic acid is dehydrogenated to give the monounsaturated derivative, oleic acid.

Oleic acid undergoes the typical reactions of carboxylic acids and alkenes. It is soluble in aqueous base to give soaps called oleates. Iodine adds across the double bond. Hydrogenation of the double bond yields the saturated derivative stearic acid. Oxidation at the double bond occurs slowly in air, and is known as rancidification in foodstuffs and as drying in coatings.

Reduction of the carboxylic acid group yields oleyl alcohol. Ozonolysis of oleic acid is an important route to azelaic aldehyde. The coproduct is nonanoic aldehyde:

H_{17}C_{8}CH=CHC_{7}H_{14}CO_{2}H + 4"O" → HO_{2}CC_{7}H_{14}CHO + H_{17}C_{8}CHO

Through further oxidation azelaic acid is produced the Esters of azelaic acid find applications in lubrication and plasticizers.

Neutralizing oleic acid with ethanolamines gives the protic ionic liquid monoethanolamine oleate.

== Related compounds ==
The trans isomer of oleic acid is called elaidic acid or trans-9-octadecenoic acid. These isomers have distinct physical properties and biochemical properties. Elaidic acid, the most abundant trans fatty acid in diet, appears to have an adverse effect on health. A reaction that converts oleic acid to elaidic acid is called elaidinization.

Another naturally occurring isomer of oleic acid is petroselinic acid.

In chemical analysis, fatty acids are separated by gas chromatography of their methyl ester derivatives. Alternatively, separation of unsaturated isomers is possible by argentation thin-layer chromatography.

In ethenolysis, methyl oleate, the methyl ester of the acid, converts to 1-decene and methyl 9-decenoate:

CH_{3}(CH_{2})_{7}CH=CH(CH_{2})_{7}CO_{2}Me + CH_{2}=CH_{2} → CH_{3}(CH_{2})_{7}CH=CH_{2} + MeO_{2}C(CH_{2})_{7}CH=CH_{2}

Several organometallic oleates exist:

- Cobalt oleate
- Copper oleate

== Dietary sources ==
Properties of vegetable oils The nutritional values are expressed as percent (%) by mass of total fat.
Type	Processing treatment	Saturated fatty acids	Monounsaturated fatty acids		Polyunsaturated fatty acids				Smoke point
Type	Processing treatment	Saturated fatty acids	Total	Oleic acid (ω−9)	Total	α-Linolenic acid (ω−3)	Linoleic acid (ω−6)	ω−6:3 ratio	Smoke point
Avocado		11.6	70.6	67.9	13.5	1	12.5	12.5:1	250 °C (482 °F)
Brazil nut		17.6	26.7	26.1	55.7	0.1	55.6	457:1	208 °C (406 °F)
Canola		7.4	63.3	61.8	28.1	9.1	18.6	2:1	204 °C (400 °F)
Coconut		82.5	6.3	6	1.7	0.019	1.68	88:1	175 °C (347 °F)
Corn		12.9	27.6	27.3	54.7	1	58	58:1	232 °C (450 °F)
Cottonseed		25.9	17.8	19	51.9	1	54	54:1	216 °C (420 °F)
Cottonseed	hydrogenated	93.6	1.5		0.6	0.2	0.3	1.5:1	
Flaxseed/linseed		9.0	18.4	18	67.8	53	13	0.2:1	107 °C (225 °F)
Grape seed		9.6	16.1	15.8	69.9	0.10	69.6	very high	216 °C (421 °F)
Hemp seed		7.0	9.0	9.0	82.0	22.0	54.0	2.5:1	166 °C (330 °F)
High-oleic safflower oil		7.5	75.2	75.2	12.8	0	12.8	very high	212 °C (414 °F)
Olive (extra virgin)		13.8	73.0	71.3	10.5	0.7	9.8	14:1	193 °C (380 °F)
Palm		49.3	37.0	40	9.3	0.2	9.1	45.5:1	235 °C (455 °F)
Palm	hydrogenated	88.2	5.7		0				
Peanut		16.2	57.1	55.4	19.9	0.318	19.6	61.6:1	232 °C (450 °F)
Rice bran oil		25	38.4	38.4	36.6	2.2	34.4	15.6:1	232 °C (450 °F)
Sesame		14.2	39.7	39.3	41.7	0.3	41.3	138:1	
Soybean		15.6	22.8	22.6	57.7	7	51	7.3:1	238 °C (460 °F)
Soybean	partially hydrogenated	14.9	43.0	42.5	37.6	2.6	34.9	13.4:1	
Sunflower oil		8.99	63.4	62.9	20.7	0.16	20.5	128:1	227 °C (440 °F)
Walnut oil	unrefined	9.1	22.8	22.2	63.3	10.4	52.9	5:1	160 °C (320 °F)

== Biological activity ==
Oleic acid is an endogenous agonist of the TLX, a previously orphan nuclear receptor. It is peripherally selective, necessitating the use of synthetic drugs to act on this receptor for potential medical applications. The drug amdiglurax (NSI-189, ALTO-100) has been reported to act as a highly potent agonist of the TLX.

== Uses ==
Safflower and olive oil have one of the highest levels of oleic acid among dietary fats

Oleic acid is used as a component in many foods, in the form of its triglycerides. It is a component of the normal human diet, being a part of animal fats and vegetable oils.

Oleic acid as its sodium salt is a major component of soap as an emulsifying agent. It is also used as an emollient. Small amounts of oleic acid are used as an excipient in pharmaceuticals, and it is used as an emulsifying or solubilizing agent in aerosol products.

=== Niche uses ===
Oleic acid is used to induce lung damage in certain types of animals for the purpose of testing new drugs and other means to treat lung diseases. Specifically in sheep, intravenous administration of oleic acid causes acute lung injury with corresponding pulmonary edema.

Oleic acid is used as a soldering flux in stained glass work for joining lead came.

== Health effects ==
Oleic acid is the most common monounsaturated fat in the human diet (~90% of all monounsaturated fats). Monounsaturated fat consumption has been associated with decreased low-density lipoprotein (LDL) cholesterol, and possibly with increased high-density lipoprotein (HDL) cholesterol. Oleic acid may be responsible for the hypotensive (blood pressure reducing) effects of olive oil that is considered a health benefit. A 2017 review found that diets enriched in oleic acid are beneficial for regulating body weight.

The United States FDA has approved a health claim on reduced risk of coronary heart disease for high oleic (> 70% oleic acid) oils. Some oil plants have cultivars bred to increase the amount of oleic acid in the oils. In addition to providing a health claim, the heat stability and shelf life may also be improved, but only if the increase in monounsaturated oleic acid levels correspond to a substantial reduction in polyunsaturated fatty acid (especially α-linolenic acid) content. When the saturated fat or trans fat in a fried food is replaced with a stable high oleic oil, consumers may be able to avoid certain health risks associated with consuming saturated fat and trans fat.

== See also ==
- Oleylamine – the corresponding amine
- Oleamide – the corresponding amide
