= LSN2463359 =

Metabotropic glutamate receptor 5 positive allosteric modulator

Names
- IUPAC name N-Propan-2-yl-5-(2-pyridin-4-ylethynyl)pyridine-2-carboxamide

Identifiers
CAS Number	1401031-52-4
3D model (JSmol)	Interactive image
ChEMBL	ChEMBL2431212
ChemSpider	30835751.html : 30835751
EC Number	802-759-0
IUPHAR/BPS	6394
PubChem CID	72551298
CompTox Dashboard (EPA)	DTXSID601166641
- InChI: InChI=1S/C16H15N3O/c1-12(2)19-16(20)15-6-5-14(11-18-15)4-3-13-7-9-17-10-8-13/h5-12H,1-2H3,(H,19,20) Key: STAFRSGTRKNXHF-UHFFFAOYSA-N
- SMILES: CC(C)NC(=O)C1=NC=C(C=C1)C#CC2=CC=NC=C2

Properties
Chemical formula	C_{16}H_{15}N_{3}O
Molar mass	265.316 g·mol^{−1}

Hazards
- GHS labelling
Pictograms	(GHS07: Exclamation mark)
Signal word	Warning
Hazard statements	H302, H315, H319, H335
Precautionary statements	P261, P264, P264+P265, P270, P271, P280, P301+P317, P302+P352, P304+P340, P305+P351+P338, P319, P321, P330, P332+P317, P337+P317, P362+P364, P403+P233, P405, P501
- Except where otherwise noted, data are given for materials in their standard state (at 25 °C [77 °F], 100 kPa). Infobox references

LSN2463359 is a drug used in scientific research.

== Mechanism of action ==
LSN2463359 is a positive allosteric modulator of the mGluR_{5}, which means it increases the activity of glutamate (an excitatory neurotransmitter) at this receptor.

== Potential uses ==
A study has found that LSN2463359 and similar drugs can be used as a treatment to some aspects of cognitive deficits in schizophrenia. Another study also mention that it could be used in the treatment of schizophrenia due to the potential interactions between NMDA receptors and mGluR_{5}.
