= AZD9272 =

Medication

AZD 9272
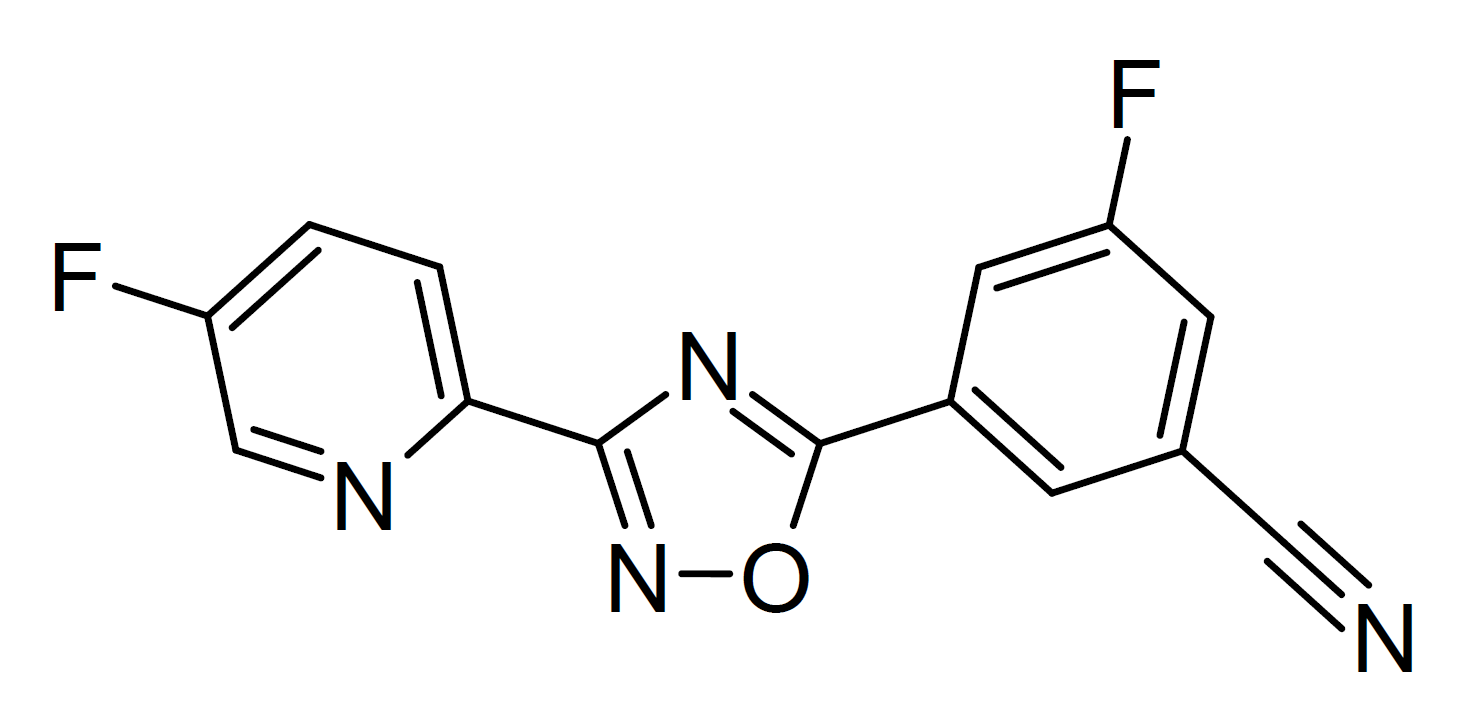

Identifiers
- IUPAC name: 3-fluoro-5-[3-(5-fluoropyridin-2-yl)-1,2,4-oxadiazol-5-yl]benzonitrile
- CAS Number: 327056-26-8
- PubChem CID: 9838729
- IUPHAR/BPS: 6439
- ChemSpider: 8014449
- UNII: 54SQ9B412I
- ChEMBL: ChEMBL2164551

Chemical and physical data
- Formula: C_{14}H_{6}F_{2}N_{4}O
- Molar mass: 284.226 g·mol^{−1}
- 3D model (JSmol): Interactive image
- SMILES: N#Cc1cc(cc(F)c1)c1nc(no1)c1ncc(F)cc1
- InChI: InChI=1S/C14H6F2N4O/c15-10-1-2-12(18-7-10)13-19-14(21-20-13)9-3-8(6-17)4-11(16)5-9/h1-5,7H; Key:RBSPCALDSNXWEP-UHFFFAOYSA-N

AZD 9272 is a drug which acts as a selective antagonist for the metabotropic glutamate receptor subtype mGluR5. It was unsuccessful in human trials as an analgesic, but continues to be widely used in research especially as its radiolabelled forms.

== See also ==
- Basimglurant
- Fenobam
