= C18H13ClFN3 =

The molecular formula C_{18}H_{13}ClFN_{3} (molar mass: 325.767 g/mol, exact mass: 325.0782 u) may refer to:

- Basimglurant (RG-7090)
- Midazolam
