= SIB-1757 =

Chemical compound

Identifiers
- IUPAC name: 6-methyl-2-(phenylazo)-3-pyridinol
- CAS Number: 31993-01-8
- PubChem CID: 6849066
- ChemSpider: 10654582
- CompTox Dashboard (EPA): DTXSID00425754
- ECHA InfoCard: 100.164.315

Chemical and physical data
- Formula: C_{12}H_{11}N_{3}O
- Molar mass: 213.240 g·mol^{−1}
- 3D model (JSmol): Interactive image
- SMILES: Oc1ccc(C)nc1\N=N\c2ccccc2
- InChI: InChI=1S/C12H11N3O/c1-9-7-8-11(16)12(13-9)15-14-10-5-3-2-4-6-10/h2-8,16H,1H3/b15-14+; Key:LOCPVWIREQIGNQ-CCEZHUSRSA-N

SIB-1757 is a drug used in scientific research which was one of the first compounds developed that acts as a selective antagonist for the metabotropic glutamate receptor subtype mGluR_{5}. It has anti-hyperalgesia effects in animals. SIB-1757 along with other mGluR_{5} antagonists has been shown to have neuroprotective and hepatoprotective effects, and it is also used to study the role of the mGluR_{5} receptor in brain development.
