= Cobalt oleate =

Names
- IUPAC name Cobalt (Z)-octadec-9-enoate
- Other names Cobaltous oleate

Identifiers
CAS Number	19192-71-3
3D model (JSmol)	Interactive image
ChemSpider	17215414
ECHA InfoCard	100.038.953
EC Number	242-865-9
PubChem CID	14389596
UNII	5YJ884691M
CompTox Dashboard (EPA)	DTXSID6027769
- InChI: InChI=1S/2C18H34O2.Co/c2*1-2-3-4-5-6-7-8-9-10-11-12-13-14-15-16-17-18(19)20;/h2*9-10H,2-8,11-17H2,1H3,(H,19,20);/q;;+2/p-2/b2*10-9-; Key: LHEFLUZWISWYSQ-CVBJKYQLSA-L
- SMILES: CCCCCCCC/C=C\CCCCCCCC(=O)[O-].CCCCCCCC/C=C\CCCCCCCC(=O)[O-].[Co+2]

Properties
Chemical formula	C_{36}H_{66}CoO_{4}
Molar mass	621.853 g·mol^{−1}
Appearance	Purple powder
Solubility	Soluble in benzene, carbon tetrachloride, pyridine, chloroform, quinoline

Hazards
- GHS labelling
Pictograms	(GHS07: Exclamation mark) (GHS09: Environmental hazard)
Signal word	Warning
Hazard statements	H317, H411, H412
Precautionary statements	P261, P272, P273, P280, P302+P352, P321, P333+P313, P362+P364, P391, P501

Related compounds
Other cations	Copper oleate; Sodium oleate
- Except where otherwise noted, data are given for materials in their standard state (at 25 °C [77 °F], 100 kPa). Infobox references

Cobalt oleate is an organometallic compound with the formula Co(C_{18}H_{33}O_{2})_{2}. When cobalt oleate is added to non-polar solvents, the viscosity rapidly increases, and then continues increasing over time. This unusual viscosity effect is caused by the formation of a weak coordination complex with the solvent molecules.

== Preparation ==
Cobalt oleate can be synthesized by heating a solution of sodium oleate and cobalt(II) chloride to 70 °C.

2 NaC_{18}H_{33}O_{2} + CoCl_{2} → 2 NaCl + Co(C_{18}H_{33}O_{2})_{2}

== See also ==
- Oleic acid
