= Elaidic acid =

18-Carbon monounsaturated fatty acid

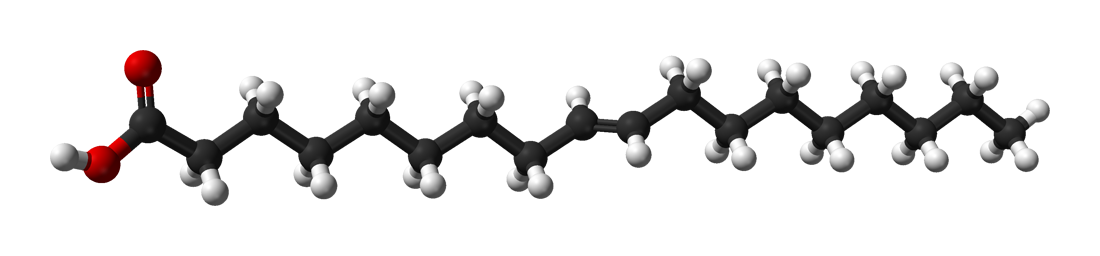

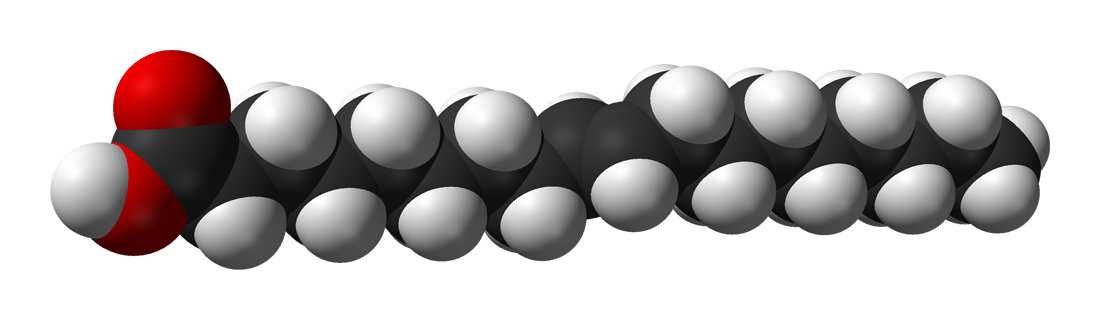

Names
- IUPAC name (E)-octadec-9-enoic acid
- Other names (E)-9-octadecenoic acid (9E)-octadecenoic acid trans-9-octadecenoic acid 18:1 trans-9 C18:1 trans-9

Identifiers
CAS Number	112-79-8
3D model (JSmol)	Interactive image
ChEBI	CHEBI:27997
ChEMBL	ChEMBL460657
ChemSpider	553123
DrugBank	DB04224
ECHA InfoCard	100.003.642
KEGG	C01712
PubChem CID	637517
UNII	4837010H8C
CompTox Dashboard (EPA)	DTXSID8058619
- InChI: InChI=1S/C18H34O2/c1-2-3-4-5-6-7-8-9-10-11-12-13-14-15-16-17-18(19)20/h9-10H,2-8,11-17H2,1H3,(H,19,20)/b10-9+ Key: ZQPPMHVWECSIRJ-MDZDMXLPSA-N; InChI=1/C18H34O2/c1-2-3-4-5-6-7-8-9-10-11-12-13-14-15-16-17-18(19)20/h9-10H,2-8,11-17H2,1H3,(H,19,20)/b10-9+ Key: ZQPPMHVWECSIRJ-MDZDMXLPBT
- SMILES: O=C(O)CCCCCCC/C=C/CCCCCCCC

Properties
Chemical formula	C_{18}H_{34}O_{2}
Molar mass	282.46 g/mol
Appearance	colorless waxy solid
Density	0.8734 g/cm^{3}
Melting point	45 °C (113 °F)
Magnetic susceptibility (χ)	−204.8·10^{−6} cm^{3}/mol
- Except where otherwise noted, data are given for materials in their standard state (at 25 °C [77 °F], 100 kPa). verify (what is ?) Infobox references

Elaidic acid is a chemical compound with the formula C_{18}H_{34}O_{2}, specifically the fatty acid with structural formula HOOC−(CH_{2})_{7}−CH=CH−(CH_{2})_{7}−CH_{3}, with the double bond (between carbon atoms 9 and 10) in trans configuration. It is a colorless solid. Its salts and esters are called elaidates.

Elaidic acid is an unsaturated trans fatty acid, with code C18:1 trans-9. This compound has attracted attention because it is a major trans fat found in hydrogenated vegetable oils, and trans fats have been implicated in heart disease.

It is the trans isomer of oleic acid. The name of the elaidinization reaction comes from elaidic acid.

== Etymology ==
The name elaidic comes from the Ancient Greek word ἔλαιον (élaion), meaning oil.

== Occurrence and bioactivity ==
Elaidic acid occurs mostly in industrial hydrogenation of polyunsaturated fatty acids. It's also present in small amounts in goat and cow milk (very roughly 0.1% of the fatty acids) and in some meats.

Elaidic acid increases plasma cholesterylester transfer protein (CETP) activity which lowers HDL cholesterol.

== See also ==
- Oleic acid
