= TLX =

Protein-coding gene in the species Homo sapiens

NR2E1

Identifiers
- Aliases: NR2E1, TLL, TLX, XTLL, nuclear receptor subfamily 2 group E member 1
- External IDs: OMIM: 603849; MGI: 1100526; GeneCards: NR2E1
Available structures
| PDB | Ortholog search: PDBe RCSB |
| PDB | List of PDB id codes 4XAJ |

Gene location (Human)
| Chr. | Chromosome 6 (human) |
| Band | 6q21 | Start | 108,166,022 bp |
| Band | 6q21 | End | 108,188,805 bp |

Gene location (Mouse)
| Chr. | Chromosome 10 (mouse) |
| Band | 10 B2|10 22.89 cM | Start | 42,437,959 bp |
| Band | 10 B2|10 22.89 cM | End | 42,459,628 bp |
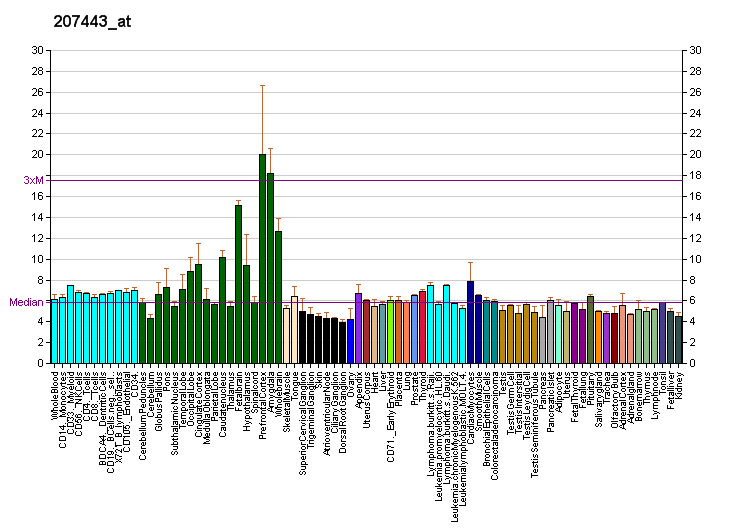
RNA expression pattern
| Bgee | Human / Mouse (ortholog); Top expressed in: ventricular zone; secondary oocyte; ganglionic eminence; retinal pigment epithelium; caudate nucleus; internal globus pallidus; amygdala; putamen; nucleus accumbens; entorhinal cortex / Top expressed in: zygote; secondary oocyte; ventricular zone; primary oocyte; olfactory epithelium; medial ganglionic eminence; retinal pigment epithelium; male urethra; pretectal area; neural layer of retina; More reference expression data |
| BioGPS | More reference expression data |
Gene ontology
| Molecular function | sequence-specific DNA binding; DNA binding; DNA-binding transcription factor activity; zinc ion binding; DNA-binding transcription activator activity, RNA polymerase II-specific; histone deacetylase binding; metal ion binding; steroid hormone receptor activity; DNA-binding transcription repressor activity, RNA polymerase II-specific; enzyme binding; DNA-binding transcription factor activity, RNA polymerase II-specific; protein binding |
| Cellular component | nucleoplasm; nucleus |
| Biological process | glial cell migration; cell fate commitment; negative regulation of astrocyte differentiation; regulation of transcription, DNA-templated; negative regulation of neuron differentiation; somatic stem cell population maintenance; dentate gyrus development; negative regulation of neural precursor cell proliferation; regulation of cellular component organization; extracellular matrix organization; negative regulation of apoptotic process; negative regulation of transcription by RNA polymerase II; behavioral fear response; regulation of timing of neuron differentiation; transcription, DNA-templated; nervous system development; positive regulation of angiogenesis; anterior commissure morphogenesis; regulation of dendrite morphogenesis; positive regulation of neural precursor cell proliferation; multicellular organism development; brain development; positive regulation of cell cycle; amygdala development; retina development in camera-type eye; forebrain generation of neurons; layer formation in cerebral cortex; positive regulation of cell population proliferation; cerebral cortex development; social behavior; cerebral cortex neuron differentiation; regulation of cell migration involved in sprouting angiogenesis; camera-type eye development; olfactory bulb development; transcription initiation from RNA polymerase II promoter; positive regulation of stem cell proliferation; aggressive behavior; visual perception; steroid hormone mediated signaling pathway; positive regulation of transcription by RNA polymerase II; long-term potentiation |
Sources:Amigo / QuickGO
Orthologs
| Databases | NCBI: entry; OMA: entry |
| Species | Human | Mouse |
| Entrez | 7101 | 21907 |
| Ensembl | ENSG00000112333 | ENSMUSG00000019803 |
| UniProt | Q9Y466 | Q64104 |
| RefSeq (mRNA) | NM_001286102; NM_003269 | NM_152229 |
| RefSeq (protein) | NP_001273031; NP_003260 | NP_689415 |
| Location (UCSC) | Chr 6: 108.17 – 108.19 Mb | Chr 10: 42.44 – 42.46 Mb |
| PubMed search |
- Wikidata
| View/Edit Human | View/Edit Mouse |

Nuclear receptor TLX, also known as nuclear receptor subfamily 2 group E member 1 (NR2E1), is a protein that in humans is encoded by the NR2E1 gene. TLX is a member of the nuclear receptor family of intracellular transcription factors and is a homologue of the Drosophila tailless gene.

TLX is part of the nuclear receptor subfamily 2 of retinoid X receptor-like proteins. However, unlike the retinoid X receptors, in typical physiologic circumstances it mostly binds to DNA by itself (as a monomer) instead of binding to another protein as a dimer. Using the type I-IV classification system, this means it's likely a type IV nuclear receptor.

== Function ==
TLX regulates the expression of another nuclear receptor, retinoic acid receptor (RAR).

TLX also is essential for normal brain-eye coordination and appears to play a role in control of aggressive behavior.

Adult neural stem cells are nuclear receptor TLX-positive and TLX expression in these cells is crucial in maintaining their undifferentiated state. Furthermore, TLX regulates adult neural stem cell proliferation. Removal of TLX from the adult mouse brain resulted in a reduction of stem cell proliferation and spatial learning.

Tlx-positive cells of the subventricular zone of adult mouse brain are self-renewing stem cells. Mutation of the Tlx gene in adult mouse brain leads to complete loss of neurogenesis in the subventricular zone. Tlx is also required for transition from radial glial cells to astrocyte-like neural stem cells.

== Ligands ==
TLX was previously an orphan receptor, a receptor without a known endogenous ligand. However, it is now known that the fatty acid oleic acid as an endogenous agonist of TLX. Oleic acid is peripherally selective, necessitating the use of synthetic drugs to act on this receptor for potential medical applications.

Amdiglurax (NSI-189, ALTO-100) is a highly potent TLX agonist, with a reported EC_{50} of 36.1 pM (0.0361 nM) in an ALPHA assay.

TLX belongs to a small family of NRs that lack two helices in the ligand-binding domain, forming an enlarged binding pocket. Three compounds, termed ccrp1–3 (famprofazone, 1-(1,5-dimethylpyrazole-3-carbonyl)-4-(diphenylmethyl)piperazine, dydrogesterone), have been discovered in high-throughput screening that enhance TLX's ability of transcription repression with high potency.
