= SIB-1893 =

Chemical compound

Identifiers
- IUPAC name: (E)-2-methyl-6-(2-phenylethenyl)pyridine
- CAS Number: 7370-21-0
- PubChem CID: 235382
- ChemSpider: 4470920
- UNII: 4X2F5X24UK
- ChEMBL: ChEMBL88612
- CompTox Dashboard (EPA): DTXSID801017353

Chemical and physical data
- Formula: C_{14}H_{13}N
- Molar mass: 195.265 g·mol^{−1}
- 3D model (JSmol): Interactive image
- SMILES: c1ccccc1\C=C\c(nc2C)ccc2
- InChI: InChI=1S/C14H13N/c1-12-6-5-9-14(15-12)11-10-13-7-3-2-4-8-13/h2-11H,1H3/b11-10+; Key:SISOFUCTXZKSOQ-ZHACJKMWSA-N

SIB-1893 is a drug used in scientific research which was one of the first compounds developed that acts as a selective antagonist for the metabotropic glutamate receptor subtype mGluR_{5}. It has anticonvulsant and neuroprotective effects, and reduces glutamate release. It has also been found to act as a positive allosteric modulator of mGluR_{4}.
