= CDPPB =

Chemical compound

Identifiers
- IUPAC name: 3-cyano-N-(1,3-diphenyl-1H-pyrazol-5-yl)benzamide
- CAS Number: 781652-57-1
- PubChem CID: 11245456
- IUPHAR/BPS: 1422
- ChemSpider: 9420491
- UNII: Y4F3R8YW3G
- CompTox Dashboard (EPA): DTXSID80459996
- ECHA InfoCard: 100.222.673

Chemical and physical data
- Formula: C_{23}H_{18}N_{4}O
- Molar mass: 366.424 g·mol^{−1}
- 3D model (JSmol): Interactive image
- SMILES: c3ccccc3-n1nc(-c4ccccc4)cc1NC(=O)c(c2)cccc2C#N
- InChI: InChI=1S/C23H16N4O/c24-16-17-8-7-11-19(14-17)23(28)25-22-15-21(18-9-3-1-4-10-18)26-27(22)20-12-5-2-6-13-20/h1-15H,(H,25,28); Key:BKUIZWILNWHFHD-UHFFFAOYSA-N

CDPPB is a drug used in scientific research which acts as a positive allosteric modulator selective for the metabotropic glutamate receptor subtype mGluR_{5}. It has antipsychotic effects in animal models, and mGluR_{5} modulators are under investigation as potential drugs for the treatment of schizophrenia, as well as other applications.
