= Neuralstem, Inc. =

American biotechnology company

Neuralstem Inc.
- Company type: Public
- Traded as: Nasdaq: CUR
- Industry: Biotechnology
- Headquarters: Rockville, Maryland
- Key people: Richard J. Daly: President and CEO
- Products: Stem Cell Research (currently in human trials)
- Website: www.palisadebio.com

Neuralstem Inc. is a biotechnology company headquartered in Rockville, Maryland that specializes in developing commercial-scale production of multiple types of central nervous system stem cells. In October 2019 Neuralstem announces that the company has changed its name to Seneca Biopharma, Inc. In April 2021 Seneca Biopharma merged with Leading BioSciences to form the combined company Palisade Bio, Inc.

== Company information ==
Neuralstem's patented technology enables the production of neural stem cells of the brain and spinal cord in commercial quantities, and the ability to control the differentiation of these cells constitutively into mature, physiologically relevant human neurons and glial cells. Neuralstem's NSI-566 spinal cord-derived stem cell therapy Phase II clinical trials for ALS concluded final surgeries in July 2014. Discussion for phase 3 trials began in late 2020 with the FDA.

Neuralstem was awarded orphan status designation by the FDA for its ALS cell therapy. In addition to ALS, the company is also targeting major CNS conditions with its NSI-566 cell therapy platform, including spinal cord injury and ischemic stroke. The company has received approvals from the FDA and the Institutional Review Board of University of California, San Diego, to commence a Phase I safety trial in chronic spinal cord injury.

Neuralstem also maintains the ability to generate stable human neural stem cell lines suitable for systematic screening of large chemical libraries. Through this proprietary screening technology, Neuralstem has discovered and patented compounds that may stimulate the brain's capacity to generate neurons, possibly reversing pathologies associated with certain CNS conditions. The company also developed NSI-189, its first neurogenic small molecule product candidate, for the treatment of major depressive disorder (MDD). It sold NSI-189 in 2021 to an unknown buyer for up to $4.9 million.
