= Chlorohydroxyphenylglycine =

Names
- IUPAC name Amino(2-chloro-5-hydroxyphenyl)acetic acid

Identifiers
CAS Number	170846-74-9; 1303993-73-8 (sodium salt)
3D model (JSmol)	Interactive image
Abbreviations	CHPG
ChemSpider	2879711
ECHA InfoCard	100.162.133
IUPHAR/BPS	1417
PubChem CID	3645780
UNII	LSA5YS5PNZ
CompTox Dashboard (EPA)	DTXSID60394614
- InChI: InChI=1S/C8H8ClNO3/c9-6-2-1-4(11)3-5(6)7(10)8(12)13/h1-3,7,11H,10H2,(H,12,13) Key: UNIDAFCQFPGYJJ-UHFFFAOYSA-N; InChI=1/C8H8ClNO3/c9-6-2-1-4(11)3-5(6)7(10)8(12)13/h1-3,7,11H,10H2,(H,12,13) Key: UNIDAFCQFPGYJJ-UHFFFAOYAM
- SMILES: Clc1ccc(O)cc1C(N)C(=O)O

Properties
Chemical formula	C_{8}H_{6}ClNO_{3}
Molar mass	199.59 g·mol^{−1}
- Except where otherwise noted, data are given for materials in their standard state (at 25 °C [77 °F], 100 kPa). Infobox references

2-Chloro-5-hydroxyphenylglycine or CHPG is an agonist of the metabotropic glutamate receptors, specific for mGluR5.

It is capable of directly potentiating the depolarization of hippocampal CA1 neurons induced through NMDA administration.
