= Protic ionic liquid =

Monoethanolamine oleate is a typical protic ionic liquid.

A protic ionic liquid is an ionic liquid that is formed via proton transfer from a Brønsted acid to a Brønsted base. Unlike many other types of ionic liquids, which are formed through a series of synthesis steps, protic ionic liquids are easier to create because the acid and base must simply be mixed together.

== Properties ==
Because the proton transfer reaction is reversible, the equilibrium between reactants and ionic products can shift depending on the conditions. This equilibration significantly impact the properties of protic ionic liquids since some neutral acid and base species are generally present in the solution.

Many protic ionic liquids have non-negligible vapor pressure, even though traditional ionic liquids are often touted for their low vapor pressures. Some protic ionic liquids are distillable. Additionally, during distillation protic ionic liquids exhibit what appears to be a reactive azeotrope. In other words, initially only the acid or base is vaporized, but at a specific composition both the acid and base start to vaporize and the composition of the vapor and liquid is the same. This composition depends on the anion and cation and contains more acid than base. However, when mixed with water the vaporization behavior is different and an azeotrope no longer occurs at that same composition.

The density of a protic ionic liquid mixture also appears to be higher for the composition at which the azeotrope forms. That is, if some excess of the acid is present in the mixture the density increases.
