= Phenylglycine =

Names
- IUPAC name 2-Amino-2-phenylacetic acid
- Other names 2-Phenylglycine; Aminophenylacetic acid

Identifiers
CAS Number	2835-06-5 (D/L); 875-74-1 (D); 2935-35-5 (L)
3D model (JSmol)	Interactive image
Beilstein Reference	608018
ChEBI	CHEBI:55484; CHEBI:439819 (L)
ChEMBL	ChEMBL131226; ChEMBL378605 (L)
ChemSpider	3732
ECHA InfoCard	100.018.735
EC Number	200-719-1 220-608-1
KEGG	C18623 (L)
PubChem CID	3866 (D/L); 99291 (L)
UNII	96S7ZZ1KHE
CompTox Dashboard (EPA)	DTXSID70862455
- InChI: InChI=1S/C8H9NO2/c9-7(8(10)11)6-4-2-1-3-5-6/h1-5,7H,9H2,(H,10,11) Key: ZGUNAGUHMKGQNY-UHFFFAOYSA-N
- SMILES: C1=CC=C(C=C1)C(C(=O)O)N

Properties
Chemical formula	C_{8}H_{9}NO_{2}
Molar mass	151.165 g·mol^{−1}
Appearance	White solid
Melting point	290 °C (554 °F; 563 K)
- Except where otherwise noted, data are given for materials in their standard state (at 25 °C [77 °F], 100 kPa). Infobox references

Phenylglycine is the organic compound with the formula C_{6}H_{5}CH(NH_{2})CO_{2}H. It is a non-proteinogenic alpha amino acid related to alanine, but with a phenyl group in place of the methyl group. It is a white solid. The compound exhibits some biological activity.

== Preparation ==
It is prepared from benzaldehyde by amino cyanation (Strecker synthesis). It can also be prepared from glyoxal and by reductive amination of phenylglyoxylic acid.

== Ester ==
The ester methyl α‐phenylglycinate is used to convert carboxylic acids into homologated unsaturated ketones. These reactions proceed via cyclization of phenylglycinamides to oxazolones, which can be reductively cleaved with chromous reagents.

== See also ==
- N-Phenylglycine
- (RS)-MCPG
