= N-Phenylglycine =

Names
- IUPAC name N-Phenylglycine
- Systematic IUPAC name Anilinoacetic acid

Identifiers
CAS Number	103-01-5
3D model (JSmol)	Interactive image
ChemSpider	59416
ECHA InfoCard	100.002.792
EC Number	203-070-2
PubChem CID	66025
UNII	37YJW036TP
CompTox Dashboard (EPA)	DTXSID2047016
- InChI: InChI=1S/C8H9NO2/c10-8(11)6-9-7-4-2-1-3-5-7/h1-5,9H,6H2,(H,10,11) Key: NPKSPKHJBVJUKB-UHFFFAOYSA-N
- SMILES: C1=CC=C(C=C1)NCC(=O)O

Properties
Chemical formula	C_{8}H_{9}NO_{2}
Molar mass	151.165 g·mol^{−1}
Appearance	white solid
Melting point	127–128 °C (261–262 °F; 400–401 K)

Hazards
- GHS labelling
Pictograms	(GHS07: Exclamation mark)
Signal word	Warning
Hazard statements	H315, H319, H335
Precautionary statements	P261, P264, P271, P280, P302+P352, P304+P340, P305+P351+P338, P312, P321, P332+P313, P337+P313, P362, P403+P233, P405, P501
- Except where otherwise noted, data are given for materials in their standard state (at 25 °C [77 °F], 100 kPa). Infobox references

N-Phenylglycine is an organic compound with the formula C_{6}H_{5}NHCH_{2}CO_{2}H. This white solid achieved fame as the industrial precursor to indigo dye. It is a non-proteinogenic alpha amino acid related to sarcosine, but with an N-phenyl group in place of N-methyl.

== Preparation ==
It is prepared by the Strecker reaction involving the reaction of formaldehyde, hydrogen cyanide, and aniline. The resulting amino nitrile is hydrolyzed to give the carboxylic acid.

Pfleger's historic synthesis of indigo using N-phenylglycine

== See also ==
- Phenylglycine, an isomer with the formula C_{6}H_{5}CH(NH_{2})CO_{2}H.
