= Benzyl carbamate =

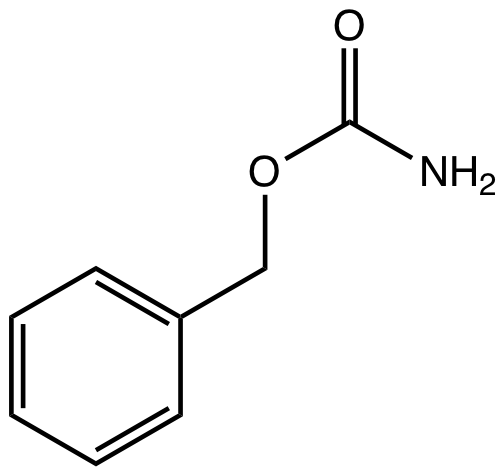

Names
- Preferred IUPAC name Benzyl carbamate
- Other names Carbamic acid, phenylmethyl ester

Identifiers
CAS Number	621-84-1
3D model (JSmol)	Interactive image
ChEMBL	ChEMBL2259788
ChemSpider	11638
ECHA InfoCard	100.009.738
EC Number	210-710-4
PubChem CID	12136
UNII	7890Q001S7
CompTox Dashboard (EPA)	DTXSID00211159
- InChI: InChI=1S/C8H9NO2/c9-8(10)11-6-7-4-2-1-3-5-7/h1-5H,6H2,(H2,9,10) Key: PUJDIJCNWFYVJX-UHFFFAOYSA-N
- SMILES: C1=CC=C(C=C1)COC(=O)N

Properties
Chemical formula	C_{8}H_{9}NO_{2}
Molar mass	151.165 g·mol^{−1}
Appearance	white solid
Melting point	88 °C (190 °F; 361 K)
Solubility in water	moderate
- Except where otherwise noted, data are given for materials in their standard state (at 25 °C [77 °F], 100 kPa). Infobox references

Benzyl carbamate is the organic compound with the formula C_{6}H_{5}CH_{2}OC(O)NH_{2}. The compound can be viewed as the ester of carbamic acid (O=C(OH)(NH_{2})) and benzyl alcohol, although it is produced from benzyl chloroformate with ammonia. It is a white solid that is soluble in organic solvents and moderately soluble in water. Benzyl carbamate is used as a protected form of ammonia in the synthesis of primary amines. After N-alkylation, C_{6}H_{5}CH_{2}OC(O) group is removable with Lewis acids.
