= (RS)-MCPG =

Chemical compound

(RS)-MCPG is a phenylglycine derivative and a non-selective antagonist of group I and II metabotropic glutamate receptors (mGluRs). It has been used in long-term potentiation (LTP) as well as long-term depression (LTD) research and proved that certain LTP and LTD pathways depend on mGluRs. Its full chemical name is (RS)-α-methyl-4-carboxyphenylglycine. It appears as a white solid and its molecular weight is 209.2 Da. Its molecular formula is C_{10}H_{11}NO_{4}.
