= Metacetamol =

Chemical compound

Clinical data
- Other names: N-Acetyl-meta-aminophenol; AMAP; meta-acetyl-aminophenol; 3-hydroxyacetanilide

Identifiers
- IUPAC name: N-(3-Hydroxyphenyl)acetamide
- CAS Number: 621-42-1
- PubChem CID: 12124
- ChemSpider: 11626
- UNII: V942ZCN81H
- ChEBI: CHEBI:76987
- ChEMBL: ChEMBL9419
- CompTox Dashboard (EPA): DTXSID3022089
- ECHA InfoCard: 100.009.717

Chemical and physical data
- Formula: C_{8}H_{9}NO_{2}
- Molar mass: 151.165 g·mol^{−1}
- 3D model (JSmol): Interactive image
- Melting point: 146 to 149 °C (295 to 300 °F)
- SMILES: CC(=O)NC1=CC(=CC=C1)O
- InChI: InChI=InChI=InChI=1S/C8H9NO2/c1-6(10)9-7-3-2-4-8(11)5-7/h2-5,11H,1H3,(H,9,10); Key:QLNWXBAGRTUKKI-UHFFFAOYSA-N

Metacetamol (developmental code name BS-749), also known as 3-hydroxyacetanilide and AMAP, is a regioisomer of paracetamol with analgesic and antipyretic properties, but has never been marketed as a drug.

Metacetamol is known to have several polymorphs. Form II is metastable, while form I is stable. Metacetamol polymorph II transforms to form I upon water moisture or direct contact with water and other popular solvents. Metacetamol II form may be obtained on cooling in narrow temperature regime.
