= Mavoglurant =

Names
- Preferred IUPAC name Methyl (3aR,4S,7aR)-4-hydroxy-4-[(3-methylphenyl)ethynyl]octahydro-1H-indole-1-carboxylate
- Other names AFQ056

Identifiers
CAS Number	543906-09-8
3D model (JSmol)	Interactive image
ChemSpider	8102466
ECHA InfoCard	100.219.728
IUPHAR/BPS	7586
PubChem CID	9926832
UNII	GT0I9SV4F6
CompTox Dashboard (EPA)	DTXSID30202777
- InChI: InChI=1S/C19H23NO3/c1-14-5-3-6-15(13-14)8-11-19(22)10-4-7-17-16(19)9-12-20(17)18(21)23-2/h3,5-6,13,16-17,22H,4,7,9-10,12H2,1-2H3/t16-,17-,19-/m1/s1 Key: ZFPZEYHRWGMJCV-ZHALLVOQSA-N; InChI=1/C19H23NO3/c1-14-5-3-6-15(13-14)8-11-19(22)10-4-7-17-16(19)9-12-20(17)18(21)23-2/h3,5-6,13,16-17,22H,4,7,9-10,12H2,1-2H3/t16-,17-,19-/m1/s1 Key: ZFPZEYHRWGMJCV-ZHALLVOQBN
- SMILES: O=C(OC)N3[C@@H]2CCC[C@@](O)(C#Cc1cccc(c1)C)[C@@H]2CC3

Properties
Chemical formula	C_{19}H_{23}NO_{3}
Molar mass	313.397 g·mol^{−1}
- Except where otherwise noted, data are given for materials in their standard state (at 25 °C [77 °F], 100 kPa). Infobox references

Mavoglurant (developmental code name AFQ-056) is an experimental drug candidate for the treatment of fragile X syndrome and other conditions. It exerts its effect as an antagonist of the metabotropic glutamate receptor 5 (mGluR_{5}).

Mavoglurant was under development by Novartis and reached phase II and phase III clinical trials. Phase IIb/III dose finding and evaluation trials for fragile X-syndrome were discontinued by the end of 2014. Otherwise, it would have been the first drug to treat the underlying disorder instead of the symptoms of fragile X syndrome. Mavoglurant was also in phase II clinical trials for levodopa-induced dyskinesia. In 2007, Norvartis had conducted a clinical study to assess its ability of reducing cigarette smoking, but no results had been published up till now. Novartis was conducting a clinical trial with this drug on obsessive–compulsive disorder.

Novartis discontinued development of mavoglurant for fragile X syndrome in April 2014 following disappointing trial results. Development was discontinued for other indications by 2017.

In 2023, Stalicla, a biotech company applying artificial intelligence to identify subgroups of high-responder patients, acquired worldwide rights from Novartis to progress the drug for substance-use and neurodevelopmental disorders.

== See also ==
- Basimglurant
