= MTEP =

Chemical compound

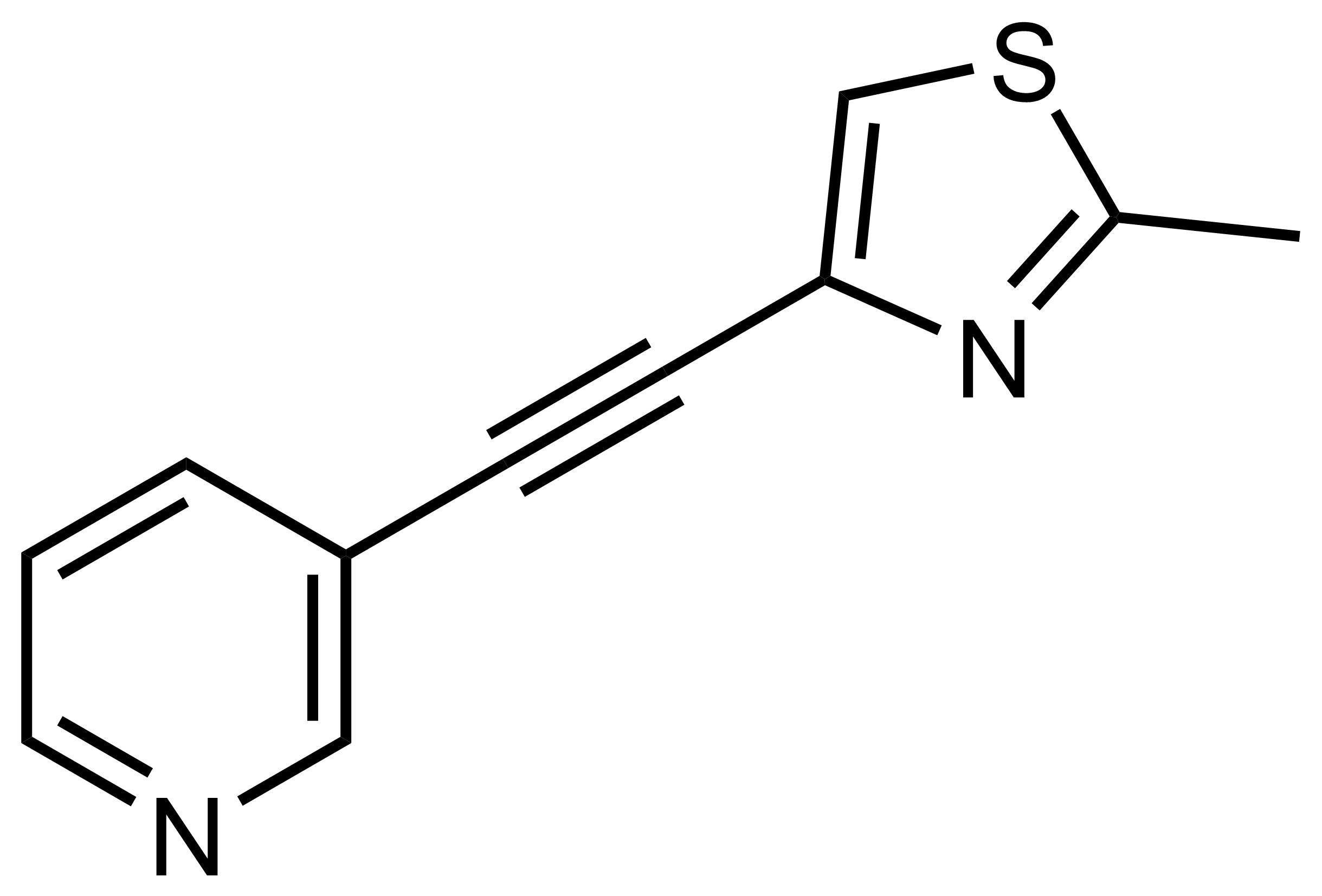

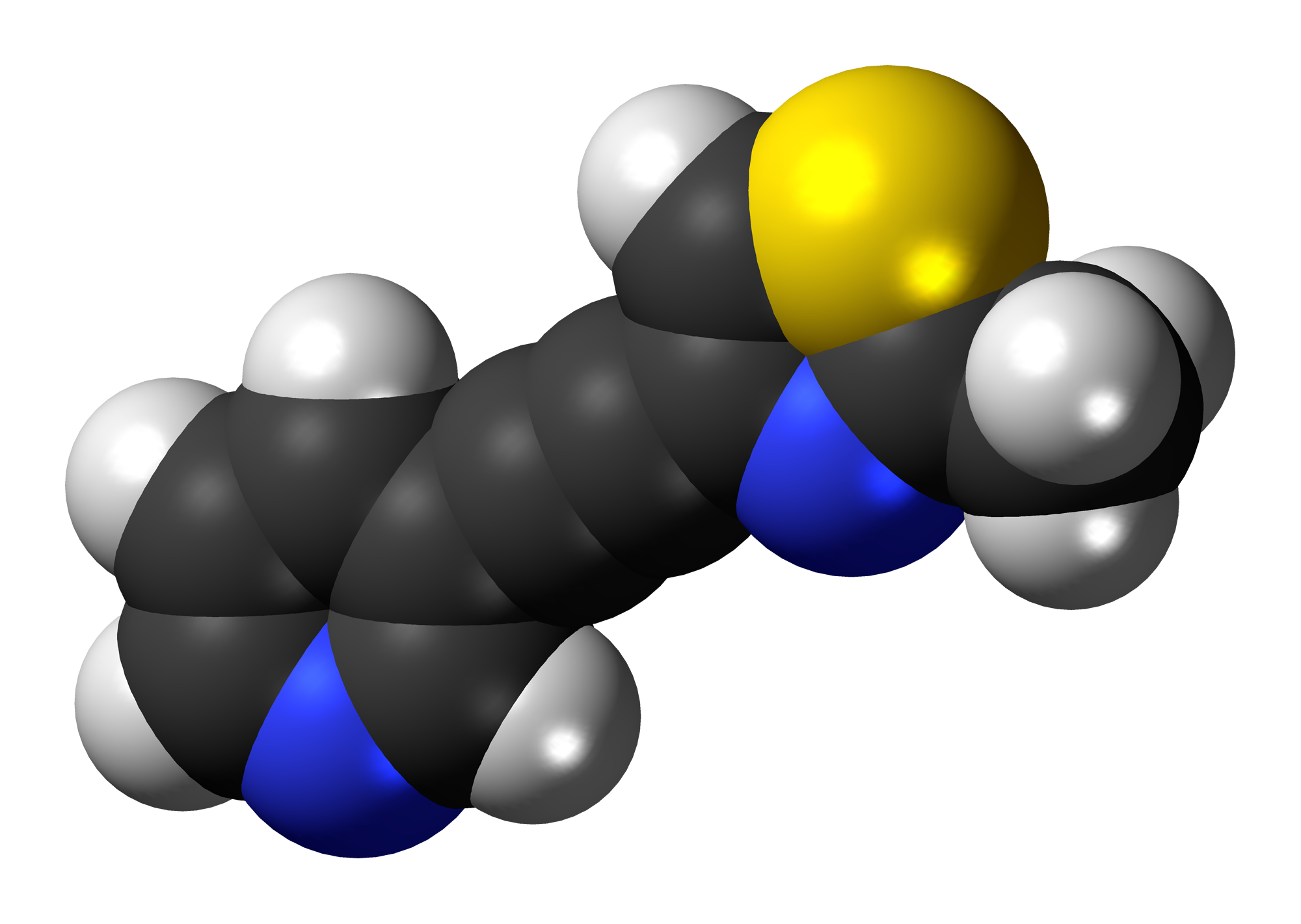

Identifiers
- IUPAC name: 3-[(2-methyl-1,3-thiazol-4-yl)ethynyl]pyridine
- CAS Number: 329205-68-7
- PubChem CID: 9794218
- IUPHAR/BPS: 3336
- ChemSpider: 7969985
- UNII: XDA7P9K5S6
- CompTox Dashboard (EPA): DTXSID30430775

Chemical and physical data
- Formula: C_{11}H_{8}N_{2}S
- Molar mass: 200.26 g·mol^{−1}
- 3D model (JSmol): Interactive image
- SMILES: CC1=NC(=CS1)C#CC2=CN=CC=C2
- InChI: InChI=1S/C11H8N2S/c1-9-13-11(8-14-9)5-4-10-3-2-6-12-7-10/h2-3,6-8H,1H3; Key:NRBNGHCYDWUVLC-UHFFFAOYSA-N

3-((2-Methyl-4-thiazolyl)ethynyl)pyridine (MTEP) is a research drug that was developed by Merck & Co. as a selective allosteric antagonist of the metabotropic glutamate receptor subtype mGluR5. Identified through structure-activity relationship studies on an older mGluR5 antagonist MPEP, MTEP has subsequently itself acted as a lead compound for newer and even more improved drugs.

MTEP is both more potent and more selective than MPEP as a mGluR5 antagonist, and produces similar neuroprotective, antidepressant, analgesic, and anxiolytic effects but with either similar or higher efficacy depending on the test used.

MTEP also has similar efficacy to MPEP in reducing the symptoms of morphine withdrawal, and has anti-addictive effects in a variety of animal models, both reducing ethanol self-administration, and also decreasing the addictive effects of nicotine, cocaine and methamphetamine.

== See also ==
- MPEP
- MFZ 10-7
- Fenobam
