= Basimglurant =

Chemical compound

Clinical data
- Routes of administration: By mouth
- ATC code: none

Legal status
- Legal status: Investigational

Identifiers
- IUPAC name: 2-chloro-4-{[1-(4-fluorophenyl)-2,5-dimethyl-1H-imidazol-4-yl]ethynyl}pyridine
- CAS Number: 802906-73-6
- PubChem CID: 11438771
- IUPHAR/BPS: 9309
- DrugBank: DB11833
- ChemSpider: 9613635
- UNII: 3110E3AO8S
- KEGG: D10864
- ChEMBL: ChEMBL3301626
- CompTox Dashboard (EPA): DTXSID801025734

Chemical and physical data
- Formula: C_{18}H_{13}ClFN_{3}
- Molar mass: 325.77 g·mol^{−1}
- 3D model (JSmol): Interactive image
- SMILES: Clc3nccc(C#Cc2nc(n(c1ccc(F)cc1)c2C)C)c3
- InChI: InChI=1S/C18H13ClFN3/c1-12-17(8-3-14-9-10-21-18(19)11-14)22-13(2)23(12)16-6-4-15(20)5-7-16/h4-7,9-11H,1-2H3; Key:UPZWINBEAHDTLA-UHFFFAOYSA-N

Basimglurant (INN; developmental code RG-7090 and RO-4917523) is a negative allosteric modulator of the mGlu_{5} receptor which is under development by Roche and Chugai Pharmaceutical for the treatment of treatment-resistant depression (as an adjunct) and fragile X syndrome. As of November 2016, it has undergone phase II clinical trials for both of these indications.

It was discovered in a medicinal chemistry effort conducted at Roche starting from the results of a small molecular weight compound library high-throughput screen based on a Ca21 mobilization assay with human mGlu5a (Jaeschke et al., 2015). The high-throughput screen identified several mGlu5 antagonists such as MPEP, MTEP, and fenobam. In partnership with Chugai Pharmaceutical, basimglurant is currently still undergoing revision from previous drug trials as of November 2016.

== Pharmacology ==
=== Mechanism of action ===
Preclinical research trials found that basimglurant has a high specificity for the glutamate receptor mGlu_{5}, and as a consequence of this specificity, also has a high level of safety.

=== Pharmacokinetics ===
Preclinical drug trials showed that basimglurant possessed a terminal half-life of 7 hours in rats and 20 hours in monkeys, indicating a dosing regimen of once daily in possible human patients. Research with rats and monkeys revealed a bioavailability of 50%, with additional studies showing that basimglurant has a rate of plasma protein binding of 98 to 99%.

== Clinical trials ==
Phase I clinical trials for basimglurant began in April 2015, and finished in September 2015. 56 people were spread out among 4 healthy cohorts, a major depressive disorder cohort, and a placebo cohort. The trial was undertaken to study (and verify) the safety of basimglurant as a potential drug. Completion of this trial allowed for basimglurant to begin phase II drug trials.

Phase II clinical trials have been undertaken, and a lack of efficacy was found overall. Improved secondary endpoints though of 1.5 mg dosage has prompted future clinical trials of the drug.

=== Future ===
Basimglurant has shown the desired characteristics of a drug with high bioavailability, few safety liabilities, and promise in the secondary endpoints of a phase IIb trial, it will most likely undergo future iterations and attempt to pass drug trials again.

== History ==
Basimglurant was originally developed for the treatment of fragile X syndrome, but after failing phase II clinical trials Roche abandoned the drug in this field of application and is renewing basimglurant as part of a treatment for depression.

== See also ==
- List of investigational antidepressants
