= 2-Methyl-6-(phenylethynyl)pyridine =

Chemical compound

Identifiers
- IUPAC name: 2-Methyl-6-(phenylethynyl)pyridine
- CAS Number: 96206-92-7
- PubChem CID: 3025961
- IUPHAR/BPS: 1426
- ChemSpider: 7970355
- UNII: 7VC0YVI27Y
- CompTox Dashboard (EPA): DTXSID7042564 DTXSID9043982, DTXSID7042564

Chemical and physical data
- Formula: C_{14}H_{11}N
- Molar mass: 193.249 g·mol^{−1}
- 3D model (JSmol): Interactive image
- SMILES: CC1=CC=CC(=N1)C#CC2=CC=CC=C2
- InChI: InChI=1S/C14H11N.ClH/c1-12-6-5-9-14(15-12)11-10-13-7-3-2-4-8-13;/h2-9H,1H3;1H; Key:PKDHDJBNEKXCBI-UHFFFAOYSA-N

2-Methyl-6-(phenylethynyl)pyridine (MPEP) is a research drug which was one of the first compounds found to act as a selective antagonist for the metabotropic glutamate receptor subtype mGluR5. After being originally patented as a liquid crystal for LCDs, it was developed by the pharmaceutical company Novartis in the late 1990s. It was found to produce neuroprotective effects following acute brain injury in animal studies, although it was unclear whether these results were purely from mGluR5 blockade as it also acts as a weak NMDA antagonist, and as a positive allosteric modulator of another subtype mGluR4, and there is also evidence for a functional interaction between mGluR5 and NMDA receptors in the same populations of neurons. It was also shown to produce antidepressant and anxiolytic effects in animals, and to reduce the effects of morphine withdrawal, most likely due to direct interaction between mGluR5 and the μ-opioid receptor.

The main significance of MPEP has been as a lead compound to develop more potent and selective mGluR5 antagonists such as MTEP, but research using MPEP itself continues, and recently it was shown to reduce self-administration of nicotine, cocaine, ketamine and heroin in animals, possibly through an MPEP-induced potentiation of the rewarding effect of the self-administered drug, and MPEP was also shown to possess weak reinforcing effects by itself.

== See also ==
- MTEP
- Fenobam
- MFZ 10-7
