= Allosteric modulator =

Substance that binds to a receptor to change its response to stimuli

In pharmacology and biochemistry, allosteric modulators are a group of substances that bind to a receptor to change that receptor's response to stimuli. Some of them, like benzodiazepines or alcohol, function as psychoactive drugs. The site that an allosteric modulator binds to (i.e., an allosteric site) is not the same one to which an endogenous agonist of the receptor would bind (i.e., an orthosteric site). Modulators and agonists can both be called receptor ligands.

Allosteric modulators can be 1 of 3 types either: positive, negative or neutral. Positive types increase the response of the receptor by increasing the probability that an agonist will bind to a receptor (i.e. affinity), increasing its ability to activate the receptor (i.e. efficacy), or both. Negative types decrease the agonist affinity and/or efficacy. Neutral types don't affect agonist activity but can stop other modulators from binding to an allosteric site. Some modulators also work as allosteric agonists and yield an agonistic effect by themselves.

The term "allosteric" derives from the Greek language. Allos means "other", and stereos, "solid" or "shape". This can be translated to "other shape", which indicates the conformational changes within receptors caused by the modulators through which the modulators affect the receptor function.

== Introduction ==
Allosteric modulators can alter the affinity and efficacy of other substances acting on a receptor. A modulator may also increase affinity and lower efficacy or vice versa. Affinity is the ability of a substance to bind to a receptor. Efficacy is the ability of a substance to activate a receptor, given as a percentage of the ability of the substance to activate the receptor as compared to the receptor's endogenous agonist. If efficacy is zero, the substance is considered an antagonist.

Orthosteric agonist (A) binds to orthosteric site (B) of a receptor (E). Allosteric modulator (C) binds to allosteric site (D). Modulator increases/lowers the affinity (1) and/or efficacy (2) of an agonist. Modulator may also act as an agonist and yield an agonistic effect (3). Modulated orthosteric agonist affects the receptor (4). Receptor response (F) follows.

The site to which endogenous agonists bind to is named the orthosteric site. Modulators don't bind to this site. They bind to any other suitable sites, which are named allosteric sites. Upon binding, modulators generally change the three-dimensional structure (i.e. conformation) of the receptor. This will often cause the orthosteric site to also change, which can alter the effect of an agonist binding. Allosteric modulators can also stabilize one of the normal configurations of a receptor.

In practice, modulation can be complicated. A modulator may function as a partial agonist, meaning it doesn't need the agonist it modulates to yield agonistic effects. Also, modulation may not affect the affinities or efficacies of different agonists equally. If a group of different agonists that should have the same action bind to the same receptor, the agonists might not be modulated the same by some modulators.

== Classes ==
A modulator can have 3 effects within a receptor. One is its capability or incapability to activate a receptor (2 possibilities). The other two are agonist affinity and efficacy. They may be increased, lowered or left unaffected (3 and 3 possibilities). This yields 17 possible modulator combinations. There are 18 (=2*3*3) if neutral modulator type is also included.

For all practical considerations, these combinations can be generalized only to 5 classes and 1 neutral:

- positive allosteric modulators (PAM) increase agonist affinity and/or efficacy. Clinical examples are benzodiazepines like diazepam, clobazam and chlordiazepoxide, which modulate GABA_{A} receptors, and cinacalcet, which modulates calcium-sensing receptors.
  - PAM-agonists work like PAMs, but also as agonists with and without the agonists they modulate.
  - PAM-antagonists work like PAMs, but also function as antagonists and lower the efficacy of the agonists they modulate.
- negative allosteric modulators (NAM) lower agonist affinity and/or efficacy. Maraviroc is a medicine that modulates CCR5. Fenobam, raseglurant and dipraglurant are experimental GRM5 modulators.
  - NAM-agonists work like NAMs, but also as agonists with and without the agonists they modulate.
- neutral allosteric modulators don't affect agonist activity, but bind to a receptor and prevent PAMs and other modulators from binding to the same receptor thus inhibiting their modulation. Neutral modulators are also called silent allosteric modulators (SAM) or neutral allosteric ligands (NAL). An example is flumazenil, an antidote of benzodiazepines, such as diazepam or alprazolam.

== Mechanisms ==
Due to the variety of locations on receptors that can serve as sites for allosteric modulation, as well as the lack of regulatory sites surrounding them, allosteric modulators can act in a wide variety of mechanisms.

=== Modulating binding ===
Some allosteric modulators induce a conformational change in their target receptor which increases the binding affinity and/or efficacy of the receptor agonist. Examples of such modulators include benzodiazepines and barbiturates, which are GABA_{A} receptor positive allosteric modulators. Benzodiazepines like diazepam bind between α and γ subunits of the GABA_{A} receptor ion channels and increase the channel opening frequency, but not the duration of each opening. Barbiturates like phenobarbital bind β domains and increase the duration of each opening, but not the frequency.

=== Modulating unbinding ===
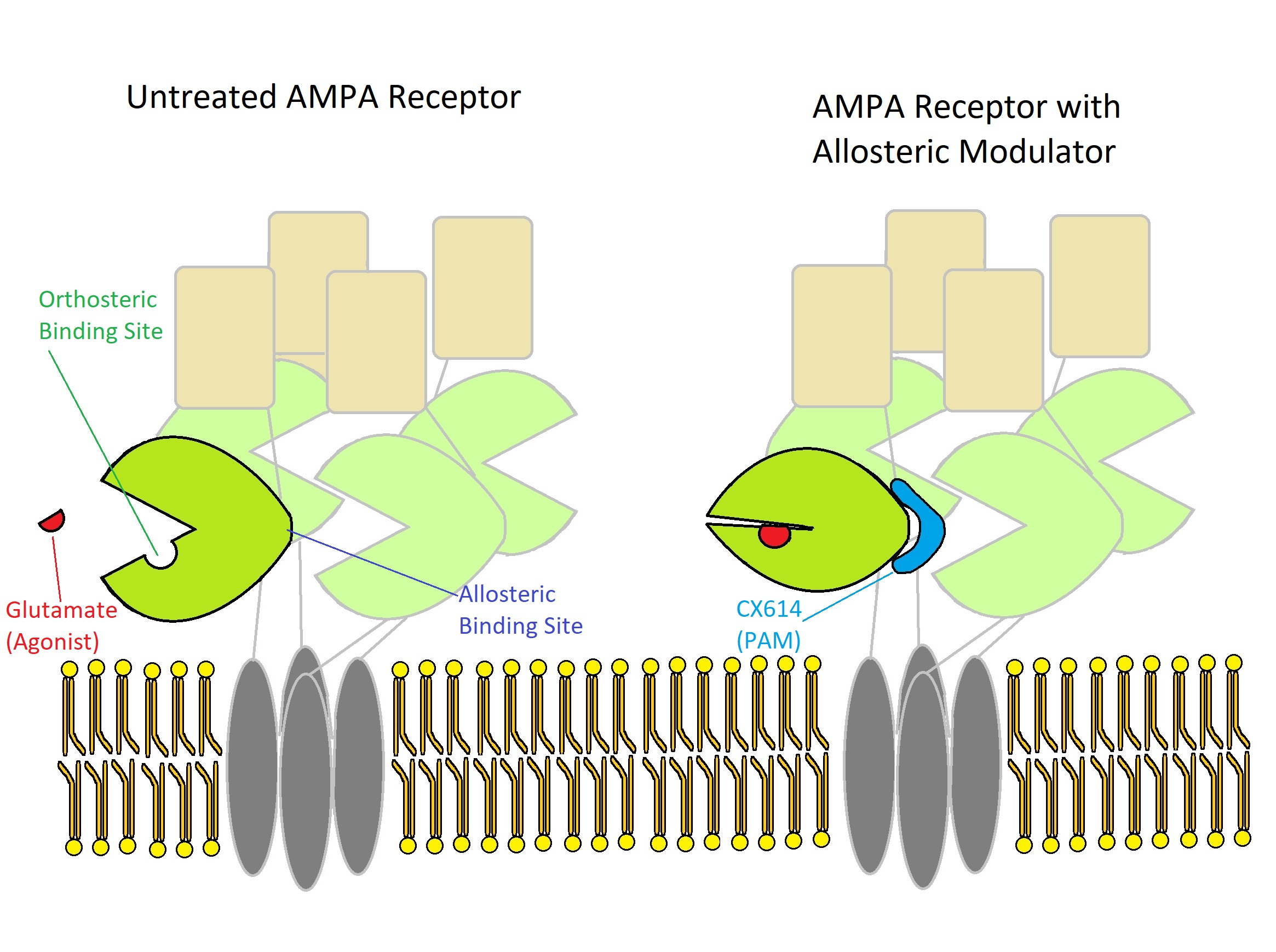
CX614, a PAM for an AMPA receptor binding to an allosteric site and stabilizing the closed conformation

Some modulators act to stabilize conformational changes associated with the agonist-bound state. This increases the probability that the receptor will be in the active conformation, but does not prevent the receptor from switching back to the inactive state. With a higher probability of remaining in the active state, the receptor will bind agonist for longer. AMPA receptors modulated by aniracetam and CX614 will deactivate slower, and facilitate more overall cation transport. This is likely accomplished by aniracetam or CX614 binding to the back of the "clam shell" that contains the binding site for glutamate, stabilizing the closed conformation associated with activation of the AMPA receptor.

=== Preventing desensitization ===
Overall signal can be increased by preventing the desensitization of a receptor. Desensitization prevents a receptor from activating, despite the presence of an agonist. This is often caused by repeated or intense exposures to an agonist. Eliminating or reducing this phenomenon increases the receptor's overall activation. AMPA receptors are susceptible to desensitization via a disruption of a ligand-binding domain dimer interface. Cyclothiazide has been shown to stabilize this interface and slow desensitization, and is therefore considered a positive allosteric modulator.

=== Stabilizing active/inactive conformation ===
Modulators can directly regulate receptors rather than affecting the binding of the agonist. Similar to stabilizing the bound conformation of the receptor, a modulator that acts in this mechanism stabilizes a conformation associated with the active or inactive state. This increases the probability that the receptor will conform to the stabilized state, and modulate the receptor's activity accordingly. Calcium-sensing receptors can be modulated in this way by adjusting the pH. Lower pH increases the stability of the inactive state, and thereby decreases the sensitivity of the receptor. It is speculated that the changes in charges associated with adjustments to pH cause a conformational change in the receptor favoring inactivation.

== Interaction with agonists ==
Modulators that increase only the affinity of partial and full agonists allow their efficacy maximum to be reached sooner at lower agonist concentrations – i.e. the slope and plateau of a dose-response curve shift to lower concentrations.

Efficacy increasing modulators increase maximum efficacy of partial agonists. Full agonists already activate receptors fully so modulators don't affect their maximum efficacy, but somewhat shift their response curves to lower agonist concentrations.

Receptor response % as a function of logarithmic agonist concentration [Ago]

PAMs shift initial agonist response curve (solid curve) to lower agonist concentrations by increasing affinity and/or increase maximum response by increasing efficacy. Dashed curves are 2 examples out of many possible curves after PAM addition. Arrows show the approximate direction of the shifts in curves.

PAM-agonists work like PAMs, but are agonists themselves. Thus they induce a response even at minimal concentrations of the agonists they modulate.

PAM-antagonists increase agonist affinities and shift their curves to lower concentrations, but as they work as antagonists, they also lower maximum responses.

NAMs shift curves to higher concentrations by decreasing affinities and/or lower maximum responses by decreasing efficacies. If compared to PAMs, the effects of NAMs are inverse.

NAM-agonists work like NAMs, but are agonists themselves. Thus they induce a response even at minimal concentrations of the agonists they modulate.

== Medical importance ==
=== Benefits ===
Related receptors have orthosteric sites that are very similar in structure, as mutations within this site may especially lower receptor function. This can be harmful to organisms, so evolution doesn't often favor such changes. Allosteric sites are less important for receptor function, which is why they often have great variation between related receptors. This is why, in comparison to orthosteric drugs, allosteric drugs can be very specific, i.e. target their effects only on a very limited set of receptor types. However, such allosteric site variability occurs also between species so the effects of allosteric drugs vary greatly between species.

Modulators can't turn receptors fully on or off as modulator action depends on endogenous ligands like neurotransmitters, which have limited and controlled production within body. This can lower overdose risk relative to similarly acting orthosteric drugs. It may also allow a strategy where doses large enough to saturate receptors can be taken safely to prolong the drug effects. This also allows receptors to activate at prescribed times (i.e. in response to a stimulus) instead of being activated constantly by an agonist, irrespective of timing or purpose.

Modulators affect the existing responses within tissues and can allow tissue specific drug targeting. This is unlike orthosteric drugs, which tend to produce a less targeted effect within body on all of the receptors they can bind to.

Some modulators have also been shown to lack the desensitizing effect that some agonists have. Nicotinic acetylcholine receptors, for example, quickly desensitize in the presence of agonist drugs, but maintain normal function in the presence of PAMs.

=== Applications ===
Allosteric modulation has demonstrated as beneficial to many conditions that have been previously difficult to control with other pharmaceuticals. These include:

- reducing the negative symptoms (deficits) associated with schizophrenia by using experimental mGluR5 positive modulators like 4-nitro-N-(1,3-diphenyl-1H-pyrazol-5-yl)benzamide (VU-29).
- reducing anxiety by positively modulating GABA receptors.
- reducing the intensity of sleep disorders by positively regulating GABA receptors.
- reducing depressive symptoms of major depressive disorder and schizophrenia by positively modulating dopamine receptors. Examples include DETQ, DPTQ and LY3154207, which are experimental D_{1} receptor positive modulators.

== See also ==
- Allosteric regulation
- AMPA receptor positive allosteric modulator
- GABAA receptor positive allosteric modulator
- GABAA receptor negative allosteric modulator
