= Fenobam =

Names
- Preferred IUPAC name N-(3-Chlorophenyl)-N′-(1-methyl-4-oxo-4,5-dihydro-1H-imidazol-2-yl)urea

Identifiers
| CAS Number | 57653-26-6 |
| 3D model (JSmol) | Interactive image |
| ChEMBL | ChEMBL239800 |
| ChemSpider | 142953 |
| ECHA InfoCard | 100.165.052 |
| IUPHAR/BPS | 1434 |
| MeSH | Fenobam |
| PubChem CID | 162834 |
| UNII | 078RCY7I27 |
| CompTox Dashboard (EPA) | DTXSID5046770 |
- InChI: InChI=1S/C11H11ClN4O2/c1-16-6-9(17)14-10(16)15-11(18)13-8-4-2-3-7(12)5-8/h2-5H,6H2,1H3,(H2,13,14,15,17,18) Key: DWPQODZAOSWNHB-UHFFFAOYSA-N; InChI=1/C11H11ClN4O2/c1-16-6-9(17)14-10(16)15-11(18)13-8-4-2-3-7(12)5-8/h2-5H,6H2,1H3,(H2,13,14,15,17,18) Key: DWPQODZAOSWNHB-UHFFFAOYAC
- SMILES: O=C1CN(C)C(NC(NC2=CC=CC(Cl)=C2)=O)=N1

Properties
| Chemical formula | C_{11}H_{11}ClN_{4}O_{2} |
| Molar mass | 266.684 |
- Except where otherwise noted, data are given for materials in their standard state (at 25 °C [77 °F], 100 kPa). verify (what is ?) Infobox references

Fenobam is an imidazole derivative developed by McNeil Laboratories in the late 1970s as a novel anxiolytic drug with an at-the-time-unidentified molecular target in the brain. Subsequently, it was determined that fenobam acts as a potent and selective negative allosteric modulator of the metabotropic glutamate receptor subtype mGluR_{5}, and it has been used as a lead compound for the development of a range of newer mGluR_{5} antagonists.

Fenobam has anxiolytic effects comparable to those of benzodiazepine drugs, but was never commercially marketed for the treatment of anxiety due to dose-limiting side effects such as amnesia and psychotomimetic symptoms. Following the discovery of its activity as a potent negative allosteric modulator of mGluR_{5}, fenobam has been re-investigated for many applications, with its profile of combined antidepressant, anxiolytic, analgesic and anti-addictive effects potentially useful given the common co-morbidity of these symptoms. It has also shown promising initial results in the treatment of fragile X syndrome. It was developed by a team at McNeil Laboratories in the 1970s.

== Chemistry ==
Fenobam is known to exist in five crystalline forms, all of them exhibiting a tautomeric structure with the proton attached to the five membered ring nitrogen.

== See also ==
- AZD9272
- Basimglurant
- MPEP
- MTEP
- MFZ 10-7
