= Metabotropic glutamate receptor 5 =

Mammalian protein found in humans

GRM5

Identifiers
- Aliases: GRM5, GPRC1E, MGLUR5, PPP1R86, mGlu5, glutamate metabotropic receptor 5
- External IDs: OMIM: 604102; MGI: 1351342; GeneCards: GRM5
Available structures
PDB	Ortholog search: PDBe RCSB
PDB	List of PDB id codes 3LMK, 4OO9, 5CGC, 5CGD

Gene location (Human)
Chr.	Chromosome 11 (human)
Band	11q14.2-q14.3	Start	88,504,576 bp
Band	11q14.2-q14.3	End	89,065,982 bp

Gene location (Mouse)
Chr.	Chromosome 7 (mouse)
Band	7|7 D3	Start	87,233,376 bp
Band	7|7 D3	End	87,784,115 bp
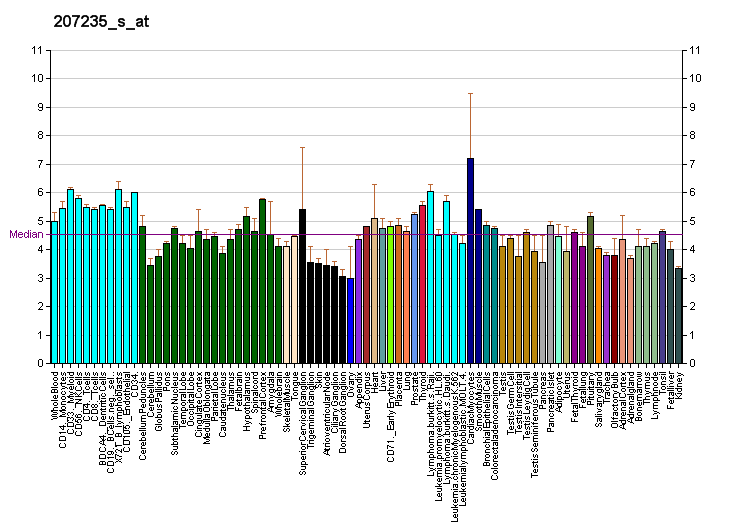
RNA expression pattern
Bgee	Human / Mouse (ortholog); Top expressed in: endothelial cell; buccal mucosa cell; Brodmann area 10; Brodmann area 46; postcentral gyrus; orbitofrontal cortex; Brodmann area 23; superior frontal gyrus; Region I of hippocampus proper; frontal pole / Top expressed in: lateral septal nucleus; olfactory tubercle; nucleus accumbens; subiculum; amygdala; anterior amygdaloid area; lumbar subsegment of spinal cord; globus pallidus; subdivision of hippocampus; Region I of hippocampus proper; More reference expression data
BioGPS	More reference expression data
Gene ontology
Molecular function	glutamate receptor activity; G protein-coupled receptor activity; signal transducer activity; G protein-coupled receptor activity involved in regulation of postsynaptic membrane potential; neurotransmitter receptor activity involved in regulation of postsynaptic cytosolic calcium ion concentration; protein binding; protein tyrosine kinase activator activity; protein tyrosine kinase binding
Cellular component	cytoplasm; integral component of membrane; neuron projection; plasma membrane; integral component of plasma membrane; extracellular exosome; postsynaptic density; membrane; presynaptic membrane; Schaffer collateral - CA1 synapse; postsynaptic density membrane
Biological process	phospholipase C-activating G protein-coupled glutamate receptor signaling pathway; G protein-coupled glutamate receptor signaling pathway; G protein-coupled receptor signaling pathway; regulation of long-term neuronal synaptic plasticity; learning; cognition; locomotory behavior; signal transduction; chemical synaptic transmission; regulation of synaptic transmission, glutamatergic; adenylate cyclase-inhibiting G protein-coupled glutamate receptor signaling pathway; regulation of postsynaptic membrane potential; regulation of postsynaptic cytosolic calcium ion concentration; regulation of protein phosphorylation; regulation of translation; regulation of translational elongation; learning or memory; calcium-mediated signaling using intracellular calcium source; synapse organization; positive regulation of protein tyrosine kinase activity; postsynaptic modulation of chemical synaptic transmission; trans-synaptic signaling by endocannabinoid, modulating synaptic transmission; regulation of intracellular calcium activated chloride channel activity; cellular response to amyloid-beta
Sources:Amigo / QuickGO
Orthologs
Databases	NCBI: entry; OMA: entry
Species	Human	Mouse
Entrez	2915	108071
Ensembl	ENSG00000168959	ENSMUSG00000049583
UniProt	P41594	Q3UVX5
RefSeq (mRNA)	NM_000842; NM_001143831; NM_001384268	NM_001033224; NM_001081414; NM_001143834
RefSeq (protein)	NP_000833; NP_001137303	NP_001074883; NP_001137306
Location (UCSC)	Chr 11: 88.5 – 89.07 Mb	Chr 7: 87.23 – 87.78 Mb
PubMed search
- Wikidata
View/Edit Human	View/Edit Mouse

Metabotropic glutamate receptor 5 is an excitatory G_{q}-coupled G protein-coupled receptor predominantly expressed on the postsynaptic sites of neurons. In humans, it is encoded by the GRM5 gene.

== Function ==
The amino acid L-glutamate is the major excitatory neurotransmitter in the central nervous system and activates both ionotropic and metabotropic glutamate receptors. Glutamatergic neurotransmission is involved in most aspects of normal brain function and can be perturbed in many neuropathologic conditions. The metabotropic glutamate receptors are a family of G protein-coupled receptors, that have been divided into 3 groups on the basis of sequence homology, putative signal transduction mechanisms, and pharmacological properties. Group I includes GRM1 and GRM5 and these receptors have been shown to activate phospholipase C. Group II includes GRM2 and GRM3 while Group III includes GRM4, GRM6, GRM7, and GRM8. Group II and III receptors are linked to the inhibition of the cyclic AMP cascade but differ in their agonist selectivities. Alternative splice variants of GRM8 have been described but their full-length nature has not been determined.

There has been extensive research into the role of mGluR5 in psychological disorders, such as addiction and anxiety. Emerging research strongly points to mGluR5 playing a direct role in the pathogenesis of alcohol use disorder in humans, showing intimate involvement in the development of behavioral sensitization towards ethanol in animal models.

== Ligands ==
In addition to the orthosteric site (the site where the endogenous ligand glutamate binds) at least two distinct allosteric binding sites exist on the mGluR5. A respectable number of potent and selective mGluR5 ligands, which also comprise PET radiotracers, has been developed to date. Selective antagonists and negative allosteric modulators of mGluR5 are a particular area of interest for pharmaceutical research, due to their demonstrated anxiolytic, antidepressant and anti-addictive effects in animal studies and their relatively benign safety profile. mGluR5 receptors are also expressed outside the central nervous system, and mGluR5 antagonists have been shown to be hepatoprotective and may also be useful for the treatment of inflammation and neuropathic pain. The clinical use of these drugs may be limited by side effects such as amnesia and psychotomimetic symptoms, but these could be an advantage for some indications, or conversely mGluR5 positive modulators may have nootropic effects.

=== Agonists ===
- CHPG (2-amino-2-(2-chloro-5-hydroxyphenyl)acetic acid)
- Monellin
- Glutamate

=== Antagonists ===
- Lithium
- LY-344,545
- Mavoglurant
- Remeglurant
- SIB-1893
- (RS)-MCPG

=== Positive allosteric modulators ===
- ADX-47273
- CPPHA
- VU-29: K_{i} = 244 nM, EC_{50} = 9.0 nM; VU-36: K_{i} = 95 nM, EC_{50} = 10.6 nM
- VU-1545: K_{i} = 156 nM, EC_{50} = 9.6 nM
- CDPPB (3-cyano-N-(1,3-diphenyl-1H-pyrazol-5-yl)benzamide)
- DFB (1-(3-fluorophenyl)-N-((3-fluorophenyl)methylideneamino)methanimine)

=== Negative allosteric modulators ===
- AZD9272
- Basimglurant
- Dipraglurant
- Fenobam
- GRN-529
- MPEP
- MTEP: more potent than MPEP
- Raseglurant
- VU0424238 (Tamagnan's name)
- Zabaglurant
- GET73 (Fluvoxamine/Zafuleptine) type analog used to treat anxiety and alcoholism.

=== mGluR5 and addiction ===
Mice with a knocked out mGluR5 show a lack of cocaine self-administration regardless of dose. This suggested that the receptor may be intimately involved in integrating the rewarding properties of cocaine. However, a later study showed that mGluR5 knockout mice responded the same to cocaine reward as wild type mice demonstrated by a cocaine place-preference paradigm. This evidence taken together shows that mGluR5 may be crucial for drug-related instrumental self-administration learning, but not conditioned associations.

== See also ==
- Metabotropic glutamate receptor
