= Pesampator =

Chemical compound

Clinical data
- Other names: BIIB-104; PF-04958242

Identifiers
- IUPAC name: N-[(3S,4S)-4-[4-(5-cyanothiophen-2-yl)phenoxy]oxolan-3-yl]propane-2-sulfonamide
- CAS Number: 1258963-59-5
- PubChem CID: 49853967
- ChemSpider: 32698813
- UNII: 9G1A824CC2
- CompTox Dashboard (EPA): DTXSID001337272

Chemical and physical data
- Formula: C_{18}H_{20}N_{2}O_{4}S_{2}
- Molar mass: 392.49 g·mol^{−1}
- 3D model (JSmol): Interactive image
- SMILES: CC(C)S(=O)(=O)N[C@H]1COC[C@H]1OC2=CC=C(C=C2)C3=CC=C(S3)C#N
- InChI: InChI=1S/C18H20N2O4S2/c1-12(2)26(21,22)20-16-10-23-11-17(16)24-14-5-3-13(4-6-14)18-8-7-15(9-19)25-18/h3-8,12,16-17,20H,10-11H2,1-2H3/t16-,17+/m0/s1; Key:TTYKUKSFWHEBLI-DLBZAZTESA-N

Pesampator (INN; developmental code names BIIB-104 and PF-04958242) is a positive allosteric modulator (PAM) of the AMPA receptor (AMPAR), an ionotropic glutamate receptor, which was under development by Pfizer for the treatment of cognitive symptoms in schizophrenia. In March 2018, the development of the drug was transferred over from Pfizer to Biogen. It was also under development for the treatment of age-related sensorineural hearing loss, but development for this indication was terminated due to insufficient effectiveness. In July 2022, Biogen discontinued the development of pesampator for cognitive symptoms in schizophrenia due to ineffectiveness.

Pesampator belongs to the biarylpropylsulfonamide group of AMPAR PAMs, which also includes LY-404187, LY-503430, and mibampator (LY-451395) among others. It is described as a "high-impact" AMPAR PAM, unlike so-called "low-impact" AMPAR PAMs like CX-516 and its congener farampator (CX-691, ORG-24448). In animals, low doses of pesampator have been found to enhance cognition and memory, whereas higher doses produce motor coordination disruptions and convulsions. The same effects, as well as neurotoxicity at higher doses, have been observed with orthosteric and other high-impact allosteric AMPAR activators.

In healthy volunteers, pesampator has been found to significantly reduce ketamine-induced deficits in verbal learning and working memory without attenuating ketamine-induced psychotomimetic effects. It was able to complete reverse ketamine-induced impairments in spatial working memory in the participants.

In addition to its actions on the AMPAR, pesampator has been reported to act as a GlyT1 glycine transporter blocker. As such, it is also a glycine reuptake inhibitor, and may act indirectly to activate the glycine receptor and the glycine co-agonist site of the NMDA receptor by increasing extracellular levels of glycine.

== See also ==
- AMPA receptor positive allosteric modulator
- List of investigational antipsychotics
- List of investigational cognition and memory disorder drugs
