= SNG-12 =

Experimental psychiatric drug

Clinical data
- Other names: SNG12; SNG 12; Synapsinae
- Drug class: Glycine transporter 1 (GlyT1) inhibitor; Glycine reuptake inhibitor

SNG-12, also known as Synapsinae, is a glycine transporter 1 (GlyT1) inhibitor, or a glycine reuptake inhibitor, which is under development for the treatment of psychotic disorders, dementia, depressive disorders, and suicidal ideation. As of September 2022, it is in phase 3 clinical trials for depressive disorders and suicidal ideation and is in phase 2 clinical rials for psychotic disorders and dementia. The drug is under development by SyneuRx. It is described as a small molecule, but its chemical structure does not appear to have been disclosed.

== See also ==
- Bitopertin
- Iclepertin
- Tilapertin
