= Mibampator =

Chemical compound

Clinical data
- Other names: LY-451395

Identifiers
- IUPAC name: N-[(2R)-2-[4-[4-[2-(methanesulfonamido)ethyl]phenyl]phenyl]propyl]propane-2-sulfonamide
- CAS Number: 375345-95-2
- PubChem CID: 9889366
- ChemSpider: 8065037
- UNII: A9V5BW73UU
- KEGG: D09931
- ChEMBL: ChEMBL1277001
- CompTox Dashboard (EPA): DTXSID20190977

Chemical and physical data
- Formula: C_{21}H_{30}N_{2}O_{4}S_{2}
- Molar mass: 438.60 g·mol^{−1}
- 3D model (JSmol): Interactive image
- SMILES: C[C@@H](CNS(=O)(=O)C(C)C)C1=CC=C(C=C1)C2=CC=C(C=C2)CCNS(=O)(=O)C
- InChI: InChI=1S/C21H30N2O4S2/c1-16(2)29(26,27)23-15-17(3)19-9-11-21(12-10-19)20-7-5-18(6-8-20)13-14-22-28(4,24)25/h5-12,16-17,22-23H,13-15H2,1-4H3/t17-/m0/s1; Key:ULRDYYKSPCRXAJ-KRWDZBQOSA-N

Mibampator (developmental code name LY-451395) is a positive allosteric modulator (PAM) of the AMPA receptor (AMPAR), an ionotropic glutamate receptor, which was under development by Eli Lilly for the treatment of agitation/aggression in Alzheimer's disease but was never marketed. It reached phase II clinical trials prior to the discontinuation of its development.

Mibampator belongs to the biarylpropylsulfonamide group of AMPAR PAMs, which also includes LY-404187, LY-503430, and PF-04958242 among others. It is a "high-impact" AMPAR potentiator, unlike "low-impact" AMPAR potentiators from other classes like CX-516 and its congener farampator (CX-691, ORG-24448), and is able to elicit comparatively more robust increases in AMPAR signaling. In animals, high-impact AMPAR potentiators enhance cognition and memory at low doses, but produce motor coordination disruptions, convulsions, and neurotoxicity at higher doses.

Mibampator failed to produce cognitive improvement in patients with Alzheimer's disease, though it did show improvements in neuropsychiatric measures. A caveat of the study was that the maximally tolerated dosage of the drug could not be used due to toxicity, and dosages in the same range in rodents notably failed to improve memory-related behavior.

== See also ==
- AMPA receptor positive allosteric modulator
- List of investigational aggression drugs
