= CX-546 =

Chemical compound

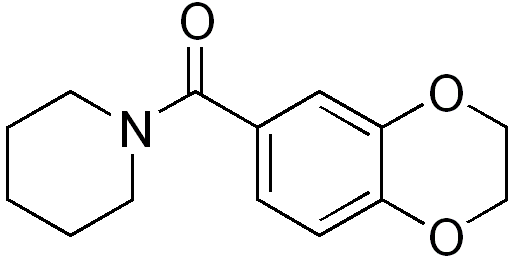

Clinical data
- Other names: CX-546

Legal status
- Legal status: US: Investigational New Drug

Identifiers
- IUPAC name: 2,3-dihydro-1,4-benzodioxin-7-yl-(1-piperidyl)methanone
- CAS Number: 215923-54-9
- PubChem CID: 2890
- IUPHAR/BPS: 4166
- ChemSpider: 2787
- UNII: PV6YEC8983
- CompTox Dashboard (EPA): DTXSID70175951

Chemical and physical data
- Formula: C_{14}H_{17}NO_{3}
- Molar mass: 247.294 g·mol^{−1}
- 3D model (JSmol): Interactive image
- SMILES: C1CCN(CC1)C(=O)C2=CC3=C(C=C2)OCCO3
- InChI: InChI=1S/C14H17NO3/c16-14(15-6-2-1-3-7-15)11-4-5-12-13(10-11)18-9-8-17-12/h4-5,10H,1-3,6-9H2; Key:LJUNPHMOGNFFOS-UHFFFAOYSA-N

CX-546 is an ampakine drug developed by Cortex Pharmaceuticals.

It has been proposed as a treatment for schizophrenia. CX-546 was the second drug of note to come out of the Cortex research program, after CX-516, but while it was an improvement over its predecessor in some respects, it still has problems with limited oral bioavailability.

However, CX-546 still represented a significant advance that led on to the development of newer compounds such as CX-614 and CX-717 with superior properties over the earlier drugs. CX-546 itself has been investigated for other applications, and most notably has been found to show significant efficacy in reversing the respiratory depression produced by sedative drugs such as opioids and barbiturates.

No effective respiratory stimulants are currently marketed for this application, with CX-546 being only the third drug discovered (after BIMU-8 and BW373U86) that effectively relieves the respiratory depression induced by fentanyl without reducing the analgesic effects. CX-546 could be developed for this purpose, although it is more likely that Cortex will use newer and more potent analogues such as CX-1739 or CX-1763, which are likely to be more suitable for commercial development.

== See also ==
- AMPA receptor positive allosteric modulator
