= LY-2365109 =

Inhibitor of the type 1 glycine transporter (GlyT1)

Names
- IUPAC name 2-[2-[4-(1,3-Benzodioxol-5-yl)-2-tert-butylphenoxy]ethyl-methylamino]acetic acid

Identifiers
CAS Number	hydrochoride: 868265-28-5
3D model (JSmol)	Interactive image
ChEMBL	ChEMBL1628564
ChemSpider	9727535
PubChem CID	11552757
- InChI: InChI=1S/C22H27NO5/c1-22(2,3)17-11-15(16-6-8-19-20(12-16)28-14-27-19)5-7-18(17)26-10-9-23(4)13-21(24)25/h5-8,11-12H,9-10,13-14H2,1-4H3,(H,24,25) Key: FKPLJWGRBCQLTL-UHFFFAOYSA-N
- SMILES: CC(C)(C)C1=C(C=CC(=C1)C2=CC3=C(C=C2)OCO3)OCCN(C)CC(=O)O

Properties
Chemical formula	C_{22}H_{27}NO_{5}
Molar mass	385.460 g·mol^{−1}
- Except where otherwise noted, data are given for materials in their standard state (at 25 °C [77 °F], 100 kPa). Infobox references

LY-2365109 is a glycine reuptake inhibitor. It is able to inhibit the type 1 glycine transporter. This inhibition increases extracellular levels of glycine. LY-2365109 has been shown to increase the seizure threshold in mice, meaning that this drug has potential as an anticonvulsant.
