= AMPA receptor positive allosteric modulator =

Class of drugs

CX-516, one of the earliest and a prototypical AMPAR PAM. It is a low-impact AMPAR PAM.

Tulrampator (S-47445, CX-1632), a newer and high-impact AMPAR PAM.

AMPA receptor positive allosteric modulators are positive allosteric modulators (PAMs) of the AMPA receptor (AMPR), a type of ionotropic glutamate receptor which mediates most fast synaptic neurotransmission in the central nervous system.

== Medical applications ==
AMPAR PAMs have cognition- and memory-enhancing and antidepressant-like effects in preclinical models. It has potential medical applications in the treatment of cognitive impairment (e.g., cognitive symptoms in schizophrenia, mild cognitive impairment), dementia (e.g., Alzheimer's disease), depression, and for other indications. They can broadly be divided into low-impact and high-impact potentiators, with high-impact potentiators able to produce comparatively more robust increases in AMPAR activation. However, high-impact AMPAR PAMs can cause motor coordination disruptions, convulsions, and neurotoxicity at sufficiently high doses, similarly to orthosteric AMPAR activators (i.e., active/glutamate site agonists).

The AMPAR is one of the most highly expressed receptors in the brain, and is responsible for the majority of fast excitatory amino acid neurotransmission in the central nervous system (CNS). Considering the broad impact of the AMPARs in the CNS, selectively targeting AMPARs involved in disease is difficult, and it is thought that global enhancement of AMPARs may be associated with an intolerable level of toxicity. For this reason, doubt has been cast on the feasibility of AMPAR activators for use in medicine. However, low doses of AMPAR activators may nonetheless be useful, and AMPAR PAMs, which, unlike agonists, show selectivity for AMPAR subpopulations of different subunit compositions, may hold greater potential for medical applications.

== Pharmacology ==
AMPAR PAMs bind to one or more allosteric sites on the AMPAR complex and potentiate the receptor. Unlike orthosteric (active/glutamate) site AMPAR activators, otherwise known as AMPAR agonists, AMPAR PAMs only potentiate AMPAR signaling in the presence of glutamate and hence do not activate the receptor directly/themselves. Moreover, whereas AMPAR agonists activate all AMPARs, AMPAR PAMs can show selectivity for specific subpopulations of AMPARs. This is because the AMPAR is composed of different combinations of various subunits, and the allosteric sites differ depending on the different subunit combinations.

AMPAR PAMs can be broadly grouped into two types based on their binding site and impact on AMPAR activation: low-impact (type I) and high-impact (type II). Low-impact AMPAR PAMs have the following criteria:

- Have little or no effect on the half-width of the field excitatory postsynaptic potential (fEPSP); and
- Do not substantially bind to the cyclothiazide site on the AMPAR complex; and
- Do not induce the expression of brain-derived neurotrophic factor (BDNF)

While high-impact AMPAR PAMs have the following criteria:

- Substantially alter/increase the half-width of the fEPSP; and/or
- Substantially bind to the cyclothiazide site on the AMPAR complex; and
- Induce the expression of BDNF

Low-impact AMPAR PAMs decrease AMPAR deactivation (channel closing) alone to augment synaptic currents while high-impact AMPAR PAMs decrease both deactivation and desensitization together to enhance and prolong synaptic currents. Low-impact AMPAR PAMs have only slight effects on AMPAR currents, whereas high-impact AMPAR PAMs have effects more similar to those of AMPAR agonists and can produce strong enhancement. Similarly to AMPAR agonists, high-impact AMPAR PAMs can cause convulsions and neurotoxicity in sufficiently high doses. Conversely, low-impact AMPAR PAMs have few adverse effects.

== Classes and list of drugs ==
=== By chemical structure ===
There are several major chemical classes of AMPAR PAMs:

- Benzamide and related compounds (also known as ampakines or CX compounds; mostly benzoylpyrrolidines) – 1-BCP (BA-14), CX-516 (Ampalex, BDP-12, BA-74, ORG-24292, SPD-420), CX-546, CX-554 (BDP-20), CX-614, farampator (CX-691, ORG-24481, SCH-900460), CX-717, CX-929, CX-1501, tulrampator (S-47445, CX-1632), CX-1739, CX-1796, CX-1837, CX-1942, CX-2007, CX-2076, ORG-26576, S-70340
- Benzothiadiazides – BIIR-777, cyclothiazide, diazoxide, hydrochlorothiazide (HCTZ), IDRA-21, S-18986
- Biarylpropylsulfonamides and related compounds – LY-392098, LY-404187, LY-450108, mibampator (LY-451395), LY-4516146, LY-503430, PEPA, PF-04778574, pesampator (BIIB-104; PF-04958242), CMPDA, CMPDB, (R,R)-PIMSD
- Racetams and related compounds (very weak) – aniracetam, piracetam, traneurocin (NA-831), various others
- Others: PF-04701475, pesampator (BIIB-104; PF-04958242), GVS-111, osavampator (TAK-653).

These classes have divergent properties, including allosteric site specificity, potency, impact (i.e., low versus high), and selectivity for AMPAR populations composed of different subunits. All of the biarylpropylsulfonamides are high-impact AMPAR PAMs, whereas the majority of the ampakines are low-impact AMPAR potentiators. The biarylpropylsulfonamides are highly potent, on the order of 1,000-fold more potent than the ampakines and cyclothiazide.

=== By impact ===
AMPAR PAMs can be broadly grouped by their impact on AMPAR activation:

- Low-impact (type I): aniracetam, CX-516 (Ampalex, BDP-12, BA-74, ORG-24292, SPD-420), CX-614, CX-717, CX-929, CX-1739, farampator (CX-691, ORG-24481, SCH-900460), ORG-24448, piracetam
- High-impact (type II): CX-701, CX-1837, CX-1846, LY-404187, LY-451646, mibampator (LY-451395), ORG-26576, pesampator (BIIB-104; PF-04958242), PF-4778574, tulrampator (S-47445, CX-1632)

== See also ==
- GABA_{A} receptor positive allosteric modulator
- NMDA receptor antagonist
- List of investigational antidepressants
