= Tulrampator =

Chemical compound

Clinical data
- Other names: S-47445; CX-1632

Identifiers
- IUPAC name: 8-cyclopropyl-3-[2-(3-fluorophenyl)ethyl]-7H-[1,3]oxazino[6,5-g][1,2,3]benzotriazine-4,9-dione
- CAS Number: 1038984-31-4
- PubChem CID: 24857397
- ChemSpider: 26354919
- UNII: 7633T9D4LN
- ChEMBL: ChEMBL1276826
- CompTox Dashboard (EPA): DTXSID701110122

Chemical and physical data
- Formula: C_{20}H_{17}FN_{4}O_{3}
- Molar mass: 380.379 g·mol^{−1}
- 3D model (JSmol): Interactive image
- SMILES: C1CC1N2COC3=C(C2=O)C=C4C(=C3)C(=O)N(N=N4)CCC5=CC(=CC=C5)F
- InChI: InChI=1S/C20H17FN4O3/c21-13-3-1-2-12(8-13)6-7-25-20(27)15-10-18-16(9-17(15)22-23-25)19(26)24(11-28-18)14-4-5-14/h1-3,8-10,14H,4-7,11H2; Key:JHCFQXNWYDLBOG-UHFFFAOYSA-N

Tulrampator (developmental code names S-47445, CX-1632) is a positive allosteric modulator (PAM) of the AMPA receptor (AMPAR), an ionotropic glutamate receptor, which is under development by RespireRx Pharmaceuticals (formerly Cortex Pharmaceuticals) and Servier for the treatment of major depressive disorder (as an adjunct), Alzheimer's disease, dementia, and mild cognitive impairment. Tulrampator was in phase II clinical trial for depression, but failed to show superiority over placebo. There are also phase II clinical trials for Alzheimer's disease and phase I trials for dementia and mild cognitive impairment.

Tulrampator is a "high-impact" AMPAR potentiator, unlike "low-impact" AMPAR potentiators like CX-516 and its congener farampator (CX-691, ORG-24448), and is able to elicit more robust increases in AMPAR activation. In animals, high-impact AMPAR potentiators enhance cognition and memory at low doses, but produce motor coordination disruptions, convulsions, and neurotoxicity at higher doses. Tulrampator itself has been found in animals to enhance cognition and memory, to produce antidepressant-, antianhedonic-, and anxiolytic-like effects, and to have neurotrophic and neuroplasticity-promoting activities. Moreover, it has been found to increase levels of brain-derived neurotrophic factor (BDNF) in the hippocampus and to stimulate hippocampal neurogenesis.

The rapidly-acting antidepressant effects of the NMDA receptor antagonist ketamine appear to be mediated through indirect/downstream activation of AMPARs. This is evidenced by the fact that its antidepressant-like effects in animals are blocked by the AMPAR antagonist NBQX. As such, tulrampator may be a rapid-acting antidepressant similarly to ketamine but without its dissociative/hallucinogenic and certain other adverse effects (e.g., urotoxicity).

== See also ==
- List of investigational antidepressants
- AMPA receptor positive allosteric modulator
