= Ampakine =

Subgroup of AMPA receptor positive allosteric modulators

CX-516, one of the earliest and a prototypical ampakine.

Ampakines or AMPAkines are a subgroup of AMPA receptor positive allosteric modulators with a benzamide or closely related chemical structure. They are also known as "CX compounds". Ampakines take their name from the AMPA receptor (AMPAR), a type of ionotropic glutamate receptor with which the ampakines interact and act as positive allosteric modulators (PAMs) of. Although all ampakines are AMPAR PAMs, not all AMPAR PAMs are ampakines.

They are currently being investigated as potential treatment for a range of conditions involving mental disability and disturbances such as Alzheimer's disease, Parkinson's disease, schizophrenia, treatment-resistant depression (TRD) or neurological disorders such as attention deficit hyperactivity disorder (ADHD), among others.

More recently developed ampakine compounds are much more potent and selective for the AMPA receptor target, and while none of the newer selective ampakine compounds have yet come onto the market, various ampakines are in clinical trials.

== Development ==
Cortex Pharmaceutical ampakines CX-546, CX-516, and CX-614.

A wide range of ampakines have been developed by RespireRx, which hold patents covering most medical uses of this class of drugs. The best known compounds that have come out of the RespireRx drug development program are CX-516 (Ampalex), CX-546, CX-614, CX-691 (farampator), and CX-717. ORG-26576 was developed by RespireRx but then licensed to Organon for development.

Several other compounds such as CX-701, CX-1739, CX-1763 and CX-1837 have also been announced as being under current investigation, and while little information has yet been released about them, CX-1739 is believed to be the most potent compound in this class to date, reportedly some 5x the potency of CX-717.

Presently, CX717 is in phase II clinical trials as a possible non-stimulant pharmacotherapy in the treatment of ADHD. As the AMPA receptors also mediate respiratory drive, CX717 is also being investigated as a therapy in opioid-induced respiratory depression and spinal-cord injury.

== Mechanism of action ==
Ampakines work by allosterically binding to a type of ionotropic glutamate receptor, called AMPA receptors.

The ampakines are mostly low-impact AMPAR PAMs, though with some exceptions, such as tulrampator (S-47445, CX-1632).

== Side effects ==
Few side effects have been determined, but an ampakine called farampator (CX-691) has side effects including headache, drowsiness, nausea, and impaired episodic memory.

== Medical applications ==
An ampakine called CX456 has been proposed as a treatment for Rett syndrome, after favorable testing in an animal model.

Ampakines have been investigated by DARPA to treat sleep deprivation-induced cognitive decline.

== See also ==
- List of investigational antidepressants
