= S-18986 =

Chemical compound

Legal status
- Legal status: US: Investigational New Drug

Identifiers
- IUPAC name: (S)-2,3-dihydro-[3,4]cyclopentano-1,2,4-benzothiadiazine-1,1-dioxide
- CAS Number: 175340-20-2
- PubChem CID: 637863
- IUPHAR/BPS: 4304
- ChemSpider: 553445
- UNII: IA262432Y9
- CompTox Dashboard (EPA): DTXSID40938656

Chemical and physical data
- Formula: C_{10}H_{12}N_{2}O_{2}S
- Molar mass: 224.28 g·mol^{−1}
- 3D model (JSmol): Interactive image
- SMILES: C1C[C@@H]2NS(=O)(=O)C3=CC=CC=C3N2C1
- InChI: InChI=1S/C10H12N2O2S/c13-15(14)9-5-2-1-4-8(9)12-7-3-6-10(12)11-15/h1-2,4-5,10-11H,3,6-7H2/t10-/m1/s1; Key:MNTIJYGEITVWHU-SNVBAGLBSA-N

S-18986 is a positive allosteric modulator of the AMPA receptor related to cyclothiazide. It has nootropic and neuroprotective effects in animal studies, and induces both production of BDNF and AMPA-mediated release of noradrenaline and acetylcholine in the hippocampus and frontal cortex of the brain.

== See also ==
- AMPA receptor positive allosteric modulator
