= CX1739 =

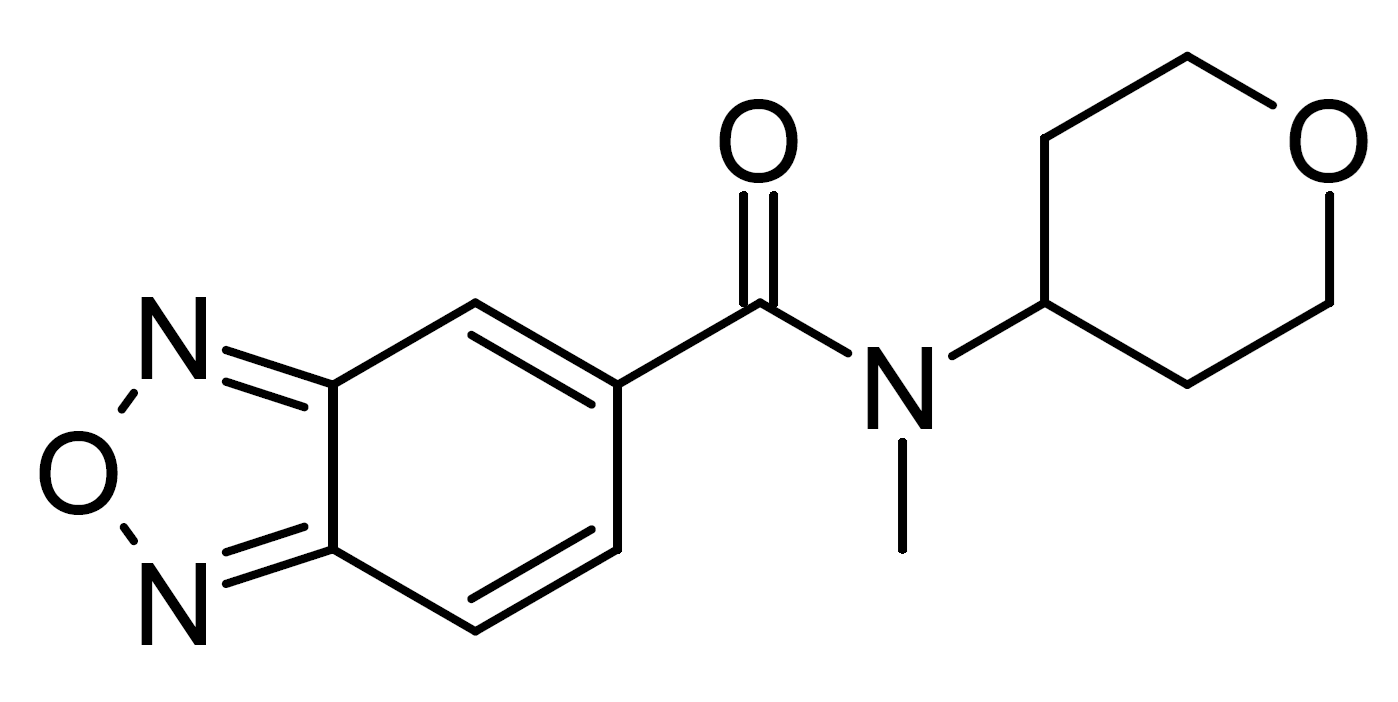

Clinical data
- Other names: CX-1739

Legal status
- Legal status: US: Investigational New Drug

Identifiers
- IUPAC name: N-methyl-N-(oxan-4-yl)-2,1,3-benzoxadiazole-5-carboxamide
- CAS Number: 1086377-48-1
- PubChem CID: 25104045
- ChemSpider: 103868867
- UNII: UPB5G360MA

Chemical and physical data
- Formula: C_{13}H_{15}N_{3}O_{3}
- Molar mass: 261.281 g·mol^{−1}
- 3D model (JSmol): Interactive image
- SMILES: CN(C1CCOCC1)C(=O)C2=CC3=NON=C3C=C2
- InChI: InChI=1S/C13H15N3O3/c1-16(10-4-6-18-7-5-10)13(17)9-2-3-11-12(8-9)15-19-14-11/h2-3,8,10H,4-7H2,1H3; Key:IRYRMRDDVXULFG-UHFFFAOYSA-N

CX1739 is an investigational new drug developed by Cortex Pharmaceuticals that is being evaluated for the treatment of a wide range of conditions such ADHD, autism, opioid-induced respiratory depression, and central sleep apnea. It is a positive allosteric modulator of the AMPA receptor (ampakine).

CX1739 has similar pharmacological effects and favorable safety profile to older "Type II" ampakines such as CX516 and CX717, but with higher potency and improved bioavailability, unlike "Type I" ampakines such as CX614 which have been found to produce neurotoxicity at high doses.

As with related ampakine compounds CX1739 has nootropic (memory enhancment) effects, and was originally investigated for applications such as treatment of ADHD and dementia, but in the course of testing it was found to be effective as a respiratory stimulant and for facilitating nerve repair, so recent research has focused on potential use for conditions such as sleep apnoea and recovery from spinal cord injury.

== See also ==
- AMPA receptor positive allosteric modulator
