= IDRA-21 =

Chemical compound

Legal status
- Legal status: US: Investigational New Drug

Identifiers
- IUPAC name: 7-chloro-3-methyl-3,4-dihydro-2H-1,2,4-benzothiadiazine 1,1-dioxide
- CAS Number: 22503-72-6
- PubChem CID: 3688
- IUPHAR/BPS: 4219
- ChemSpider: 3560
- UNII: 689UW7PT68
- ChEMBL: ChEMBL77862
- CompTox Dashboard (EPA): DTXSID70936887

Chemical and physical data
- Formula: C_{8}H_{9}ClN_{2}O_{2}S
- Molar mass: 232.68 g·mol^{−1}
- 3D model (JSmol): Interactive image
- SMILES: CC1NC2=C(C=C(C=C2)Cl)S(=O)(=O)N1
- InChI: InChI=1S/C8H9ClN2O2S/c1-5-10-7-3-2-6(9)4-8(7)14(12,13)11-5/h2-5,10-11H,1H3; Key:VZRNTCHTJRLTMU-UHFFFAOYSA-N

IDRA-21 is a positive allosteric modulator of the AMPA receptor and a benzothiadiazine derivative. It is a chiral molecule, with (+)-IDRA-21 being the active form.

IDRA-21 shows nootropic effects in animal studies, significantly improving learning and memory. It is around 10–30 times more potent than aniracetam in reversing cognitive deficits induced by alprazolam or scopolamine, and produces sustained effects lasting for up to 48 hours after a single dose. The mechanism for this action is thought to be through promoting the induction of long-term potentiation between synapses in the brain.

IDRA-21 may not produce neurotoxicity under normal conditions, although it may worsen neuronal damage following global ischemia after stroke or seizures.

In comparison to the ampakines or benzoylpiperidine-derived AMPA receptor potentiators, IDRA-21 was more potent than CX-516, but less potent than CX-546. Newer benzothiadiazide derivatives with greatly increased potency compared to IDRA-21 have been developed, but these have not been researched to the same extent, with the benzoylpiperidine and benzoylpyrrolidine CX-series of drugs being favoured for clinical development, most likely due to more favourable toxicity profiles at high doses.

== See also ==
- AMPA receptor positive allosteric modulator
- List of investigational cognition and memory disorder drugs
- Thiazide diuretics
