= C13H15N3O3 =

The molecular formula C_{13}H_{15}N_{3}O_{3} (molar mass: 261.281 g/mol) may refer to:

- Imazapyr
- CX1739
