= Tilapertin =

Chemical compound

Clinical data
- ATC code: None

Legal status
- Legal status: Investigational

Identifiers
- IUPAC name: (4-{(R)-Phenyl[3-(trifluoromethyl)phenyl]methyl}-1-piperazinyl)acetic acid
- CAS Number: 1000690-85-6
- PubChem CID: 25063875
- ChemSpider: 32699053
- UNII: A2SV488G98
- KEGG: D10672
- CompTox Dashboard (EPA): DTXSID801032317

Chemical and physical data
- Formula: C_{20}H_{21}F_{3}N_{2}O_{2}
- Molar mass: 378.395 g·mol^{−1}
- 3D model (JSmol): Interactive image
- SMILES: c1ccc(cc1)[C@H](c2cccc(c2)C(F)(F)F)N3CCN(CC3)CC(=O)O
- InChI: InChI=1S/C20H21F3N2O2/c21-20(22,23)17-8-4-7-16(13-17)19(15-5-2-1-3-6-15)25-11-9-24(10-12-25)14-18(26)27/h1-8,13,19H,9-12,14H2,(H,26,27)/t19-/m1/s1; Key:MDLQJNCGZVDZFV-LJQANCHMSA-N

Tilapertin (INN), also known as AMG-747, is a investigational drug which was being evaluated as an antipsychotic.

== Mechanism of action ==
Tilapertin appears to act via the blocking of the type 1 glycine transporter, making it a glycine re-uptake inhibitor.

== History ==
Two studies have been made in order to determine the safety of tilapertin and its potential as an add-on to anti-psychotic therapy in people with schizophrenia. These studies were later halted due to a case of Stevens–Johnson syndrome in one of the participants.

== See also ==
- Bitopertin
