= C21H25NO3 =

The molecular formula C_{21}H_{25}NO_{3} may refer to:

- N-Ethyl-3-piperidyl benzilate
- Moramide intermediate
- Nalmefene
- ORG-25935
