= C20H21F3N2O2 =

The molecular formula C_{20}H_{21}F_{3}N_{2}O_{2} (molar mass: 378.387 g/mol) may refer to:

- EPPTB
- Tilapertin
