= ORG-26576 =

Ampakine

Identifiers
- IUPAC name: (9aS)-8,9,9a,10-Tetrahydro-5H,7H-pyrido[3,2-f]pyrrolo[2,1-c][1,4]oxazepin-5-one
- CAS Number: 1026791-61-6
- PubChem CID: 13584912
- ChemSpider: 32697513
- UNII: 0H1IDR8Z4F
- CompTox Dashboard (EPA): DTXSID001336129

Chemical and physical data
- Formula: C_{11}H_{12}N_{2}O_{2}
- Molar mass: 204.229 g·mol^{−1}
- 3D model (JSmol): Interactive image
- SMILES: C1C[C@H]2COC3=C(C=CC=N3)C(=O)N2C1
- InChI: InChI=1S/C11H12N2O2/c14-11-9-4-1-5-12-10(9)15-7-8-3-2-6-13(8)11/h1,4-5,8H,2-3,6-7H2/t8-/m0/s1; Key:FIKUEZUFASUKAH-QMMMGPOBSA-N

ORG-26576 is an ampakine originally developed by Cortex Pharmaceuticals and then licensed to Organon International for development. In animal studies it has been shown to effectively potentiate AMPA receptor function, leading to increased BDNF release and enhanced neuronal differentiation and survival, as well as producing nootropic effects in standardised assays. Development as an antidepressant has been halted due to a failed Phase II trial for major depressive disorder.

== See also ==
- AMPA receptor positive allosteric modulator
