= GRIA4 =

Identifiers
- Aliases: GRIA4, GLUR4, GLUR4C, GLURD, GluA4, glutamate ionotropic receptor AMPA type subunit 4, NEDSGA, GluA4-ATD
- External IDs: OMIM: 138246; MGI: 95811; GeneCards: GRIA4

Gene location (Human)
Chr.	Chromosome 11 (human)
Band	11q22.3	Start	105,609,994 bp
Band	11q22.3	End	105,982,092 bp

Gene location (Mouse)
Chr.	Chromosome 9 (mouse)
Band	9 A1|9 2.46 cM	Start	4,417,896 bp
Band	9 A1|9 2.46 cM	End	4,796,234 bp
RNA expression pattern
Bgee	Human / Mouse (ortholog); Top expressed in: cerebellar hemisphere; right hemisphere of cerebellum; prefrontal cortex; dorsolateral prefrontal cortex; anterior cingulate cortex; cerebellar vermis; right frontal lobe; Brodmann area 9; pons; C1 segment / Top expressed in: lobe of cerebellum; cerebellar vermis; dorsal tegmental nucleus; anterior horn of spinal cord; deep cerebellar nuclei; dorsomedial hypothalamic nucleus; medial geniculate nucleus; ventral tegmental area; medial vestibular nucleus; lateral geniculate nucleus; More reference expression data
BioGPS	n/a
Gene ontology
Molecular function	ion channel activity; ionotropic glutamate receptor activity; extracellularly glutamate-gated ion channel activity; excitatory extracellular ligand-gated ion channel activity; AMPA glutamate receptor activity; protein binding; amyloid-beta binding; signaling receptor activity
Cellular component	extracellular vesicle; integral component of membrane; endocytic vesicle membrane; postsynaptic membrane; cell projection; membrane; plasma membrane; synapse; cell junction; dendrite; AMPA glutamate receptor complex; soma; dendritic spine
Biological process	glutamate receptor signaling pathway; ion transport; ion transmembrane transport; ionotropic glutamate receptor signaling pathway; excitatory postsynaptic potential; transport; regulation of NMDA receptor activity
Sources:Amigo / QuickGO
Orthologs
Databases	NCBI: entry; OMA: entry
Species	Human	Mouse
Entrez	2893	14802
Ensembl	ENSG00000152578	ENSMUSG00000025892
UniProt	P48058	Q9Z2W8
RefSeq (mRNA)	NM_000829; NM_001077243; NM_001077244; NM_001112812	NM_001113180; NM_001113181; NM_019691
RefSeq (protein)	NP_000820; NP_001070711; NP_001070712; NP_001106283	NP_001106651; NP_001106652; NP_062665
Location (UCSC)	Chr 11: 105.61 – 105.98 Mb	Chr 9: 4.42 – 4.8 Mb
PubMed search
- Wikidata
View/Edit Human	View/Edit Mouse

Glutamate receptor 4 is a protein that in humans is encoded by the GRIA4 gene.

This gene is a member of a family of L-glutamate-gated ion channels that mediate fast synaptic excitatory neurotransmission. These channels are also responsive to the glutamate agonist, alpha-amino-3-hydroxy-5-methyl-4-isoxazolpropionate (AMPA). Some haplotypes of this gene show a positive association with schizophrenia. Alternatively spliced transcript variants encoding different isoforms have been found for this gene. Like the other AMPA receptor subunits, GluA4 occurs as flip and flop spliced variant. In addition, GluA4 CTD long and short isoforms exist, and presumably an ATD-only isoform (433 aa).

== Interactions ==
GRIA4 has been shown to interact with CACNG2, GRIP1, PICK1 and PRKCG.

== RNA editing ==
Several ion channels and neurotransmitters receptors pre-mRNa are substrates for ADARs. This includes 5 subunits of the glutamate receptor ionotropic AMPA glutamate receptor subunits (Glur2, Glur3, Glur4) and Kainate receptor subunits (Glur5, Glur6). Glutamate-gated ion channels are made up of four subunits per channel. Their function is in the mediation of fast neurotransmission to the brain. The diversity of the subunits is determined, as well as RNA splicing, by RNA editing events of the individual subunits. This give rise to the necessary diversity of the receptors. GluR4 is a gene product of the GRIA4 gene, and its pre-mRNA is subject to RNA editing.

=== Type ===
A to I RNA editing is catalyzed by a family of adenosine deaminases acting on RNA (ADARs) that specifically recognize adenosines within double-stranded regions of pre-mRNAs and deaminate them to inosine. Inosines are recognised as guanosine by the cells translational machinery. There are three members of the ADAR family ADARs 1–3, with ADAR 1 and ADAR 2 being the only enzymatically active members.ADAR3 is thought to have a regulatory role in the brain. ADAR1 and ADAR 2 are widely expressed in tissues, while ADAR 3 is restricted to the brain. The double-stranded regions of RNA are formed by base-pairing between residues in the close to region of the editing site with residues usually in a neighboring intron but can be an exonic sequence. The region that base pairs with the editing region is known as an Editing Complementary Sequence (ECS).

=== Location ===
The pre-mRNA of this subunit is edited at one position. The R/G editing site is located in exon 13 between the M3 to M4 region. Editing results in a codon change from an Arginine (AGA) to a Glycine (GGA). The location of editing corresponds to a bipartite ligand interaction domain of the receptor.((((((37))))))The R/G site is found at amino acid 769 immediately before the 3-amino-acid-long flip and flop modules introduced by alternative splicing. Flip and Flop forms are present in both edited and nonedited versions of this protein. The editing complementary sequence (ECS) is found in an intronic sequence close to the exon. The intronic sequence includes a 5' splice site, and the predicted double-stranded region is 30 base pairs in length. The adenosine residue is mismatched in genomically encoded transcript, however this is not the case following editing. Despite similar sequences to the Q/R site of GluR-B, editing this site does not occur in GluR-3 pre-mRNA. Editing results in the targeted adenosine, which is mismatched prior to editing in the double-stranded RNA structure to become matched after editing. The intronic sequence involved contains a 5' donor splice site.

=== Conservation ===
Editing also occurs in rat.

=== Regulation ===
Editing of GluR-3 is regulated in rat brain from low levels in embryonic stage to a large increase in editing levels at birth. In humans, 80-90% of GRIA3 transcripts are edited. The absence of the Q/R site editing in this glutamate receptor subunit is due to the absence of necessary intronic sequence required to form a duplex.

=== Consequences ===
==== Structure ====
Editing results in a codon change from (AGA) to (GGA), an R to a G change at the editing site.

==== Function ====
AMPA receptors that occur in the flop form desensitise faster than the flip form. Editing at R/G site allows for faster recovery from desensitisation. Unedited Glu-R at this site have slower recovery rates. Editing, therefore, allows sustained response to rapid stimuli.

Splicing

A crosstalk between editing and splicing may occur here. Editing takes place before splicing. Like the other AMPA receptor subunits, GluA4 occurs as flip and flop spliced variant. Editing is also thought to affect splicing at this site.

== See also ==
- AMPA receptor
