= ASP2535 =

Type 1 Glycine transporter inhibitor

Names
- IUPAC name 4-[3-(6-phenylpyridin-3-yl)-5-propan-2-yl-1,2,4-triazol-4-yl]-2,1,3-benzoxadiazole

Identifiers
CAS Number	374886-51-8
3D model (JSmol)	Interactive image
ChEMBL	ChEMBL4303475
PubChem CID	9800113
UNII	6627LI8F9K
- InChI: InChI=1S/C22H18N6O/c1-14(2)21-24-25-22(28(21)19-10-6-9-18-20(19)27-29-26-18)16-11-12-17(23-13-16)15-7-4-3-5-8-15/h3-14H,1-2H3 Key: FQGLDGKVKDPVLO-UHFFFAOYSA-N
- SMILES: CC(C)C1=NN=C(N1C2=CC=CC3=NON=C32)C4=CN=C(C=C4)C5=CC=CC=C5

Properties
Chemical formula	C_{22}H_{18}N_{6}O
Molar mass	382.427 g·mol^{−1}
- Except where otherwise noted, data are given for materials in their standard state (at 25 °C [77 °F], 100 kPa). Infobox references

ASP2535 is an inhibitor of the type 1 glycine transporter. It could potentially be used in treatment of Alzheimer's disease and schizophrenia.

== Potential uses ==
ASP2535 has been investigated for the treatment of Alzheimer's disease and schizophrenia, it is able to inhibit the memory deficit induced by scopolamine, an anticholinergic agent.
