= Ercanetide =

Chemical compound

Clinical data
- Other names: Cyclo(L-glycyl-L-2-allylproline)

Legal status
- Legal status: Investigational

Identifiers
- IUPAC name: (8aR)-8a-Prop-2-enyl-3,6,7,8-tetrahydro-2H-pyrrolo[1,2-a]pyrazine-1,4-dione
- CAS Number: 847952-38-9
- PubChem CID: 11735696
- DrugBank: DB15601
- ChemSpider: 9910403
- UNII: 2T1HU6069S
- KEGG: D13364
- ChEMBL: ChEMBL4802144

Chemical and physical data
- Formula: C_{10}H_{14}N_{2}O_{2}
- Molar mass: 194.234 g·mol^{−1}
- 3D model (JSmol): Interactive image
- SMILES: C=CC[C@@]12CCCN1C(=O)CNC2=O
- InChI: InChI=1S/C10H14N2O2/c1-2-4-10-5-3-6-12(10)8(13)7-11-9(10)14/h2H,1,3-7H2,(H,11,14)/t10-/m0/s1; Key:WVKCGUOWPZAROG-JTQLQIEISA-N

Ercanetide (INN; developmental code name NNZ-2591) is a synthetic analog of cyclic glycine-proline (cGP) and experimental drug developed for Angelman syndrome, Phelan-McDermid syndrome, Pitt Hopkins syndrome, and Prader-Willi syndrome.

== See also ==
- Traneurocin (NA-831)
