= PRKCG =

Protein-coding gene in the species Homo sapiens

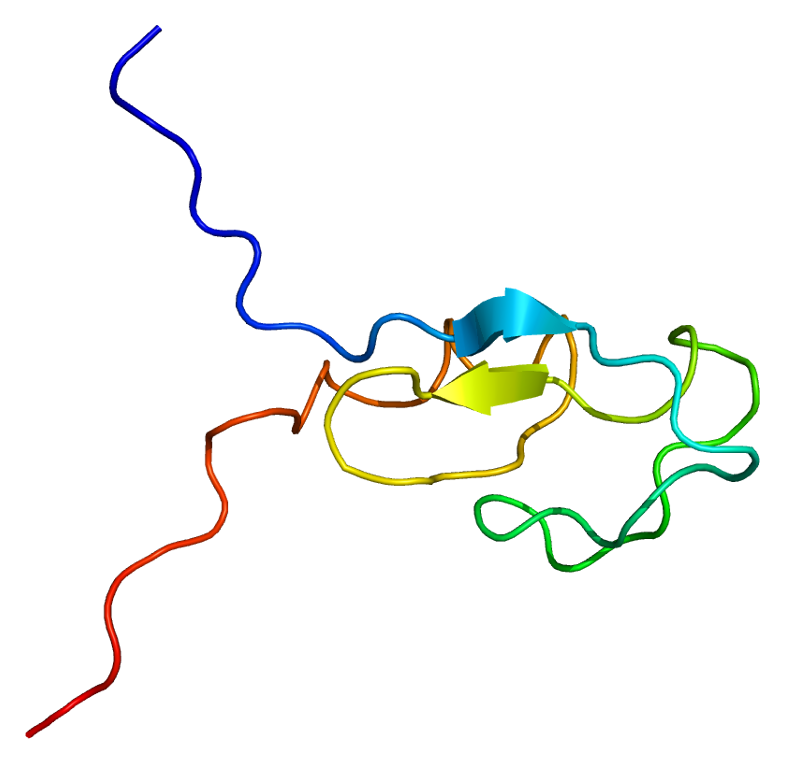

Identifiers
- Aliases: PRKCG, PKC-gamma, PKCC, PKCG, SCA14, protein kinase C gamma, PKCI(3), PKCgamma
- External IDs: OMIM: 176980; MGI: 97597; GeneCards: PRKCG
Available structures
PDB	Ortholog search: PDBe RCSB
PDB	List of PDB id codes 2E73, 2UZP
Enzyme activity
EC #	BRENDA	ExPASy	KEGG	MetaCyc
2.7.11.13	↗	↗	↗	↗

Gene location (Human)
Chr.	Chromosome 19 (human)
Band	19q13.42	Start	53,879,190 bp
Band	19q13.42	End	53,907,652 bp

Gene location (Mouse)
Chr.	Chromosome 7 (mouse)
Band	7 A1|7 1.93 cM	Start	3,337,704 bp
Band	7 A1|7 1.93 cM	End	3,379,615 bp
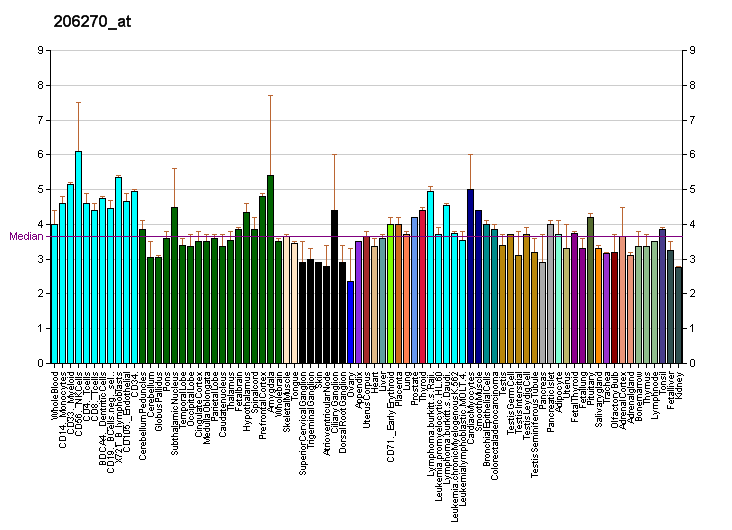
RNA expression pattern
Bgee	Human / Mouse (ortholog); Top expressed in: right frontal lobe; nucleus accumbens; prefrontal cortex; amygdala; Brodmann area 9; cingulate gyrus; anterior cingulate cortex; caudate nucleus; right hemisphere of cerebellum; hippocampus proper / Top expressed in: hippocampus proper; primary visual cortex; dentate gyrus of hippocampal formation granule cell; cerebellum; cerebellar cortex; Cortex of frontal lobe; superior frontal gyrus; striatum of neuraxis; hypothalamus; olfactory bulb; More reference expression data
BioGPS	More reference expression data
Gene ontology
Molecular function	transferase activity; protein kinase activity; nucleotide binding; protein kinase C activity; zinc ion binding; metal ion binding; kinase activity; protein serine/threonine kinase activity; protein serine/threonine/tyrosine kinase activity; ATP binding; calcium-dependent protein kinase C activity
Cellular component	cytoplasm; synaptic membrane; cytosol; cell projection; membrane; cell-cell junction; plasma membrane; synapse; intracellular anatomical structure; cell junction; dendrite; perinuclear region of cytoplasm; neuron projection; nucleus; postsynaptic density; calyx of Held; presynaptic cytosol; postsynaptic cytosol
Biological process	negative regulation of neuron apoptotic process; intracellular signal transduction; phosphorylation; negative regulation of protein catabolic process; rhythmic process; regulation of response to food; platelet activation; chemosensory behavior; negative regulation of protein ubiquitination; protein phosphorylation; response to morphine; positive regulation of mismatch repair; response to pain; regulation of circadian rhythm; peptidyl-serine phosphorylation; learning or memory; protein autophosphorylation; negative regulation of proteasomal protein catabolic process; regulation of phagocytosis; innervation; chemical synaptic transmission; response to psychosocial stress; presynaptic modulation of chemical synaptic transmission; regulation of synaptic vesicle exocytosis
Sources:Amigo / QuickGO
Orthologs
Databases	NCBI: entry; OMA: entry
Species	Human	Mouse
Entrez	5582	18752
Ensembl	ENSG00000126583	ENSMUSG00000078816
UniProt	P05129	P63318
RefSeq (mRNA)	NM_002739; NM_001316329	NM_001291434; NM_011102
RefSeq (protein)	NP_001303258; NP_002730	NP_001278363; NP_035232
Location (UCSC)	Chr 19: 53.88 – 53.91 Mb	Chr 7: 3.34 – 3.38 Mb
PubMed search
- Wikidata
View/Edit Human	View/Edit Mouse

Protein kinase C gamma type is an enzyme that in humans is encoded by the PRKCG gene.

Protein kinase C (PKC) is a family of serine- and threonine-specific protein kinases that can be activated by calcium and second messenger diacylglycerol. PKC family members phosphorylate a wide variety of protein targets and are known to be involved in diverse cellular signaling pathways. PKC also serves as major receptors for phorbol esters, a class of tumor promoters. Each member of the PKC family has a specific expression profile and is believed to play distinct roles in cells. The protein encoded by this gene is one of the PKC family members. This protein kinase is expressed solely in the brain and spinal cord and its localization is restricted to neurons. It has been demonstrated that several neuronal functions, including long term potentiation (LTP) and long term depression (LTD), specifically require this kinase. Knockout studies in mice also suggest that this kinase may be involved in neuropathic pain development. Defects in this protein have been associated with neurodegenerative disorder spinocerebellar ataxia-14 (SCA14).

== Interactions ==
PRKCG has been shown to interact with GRIA4.

== See also ==
- Protein kinase C
