= ORG-24598 =

Selective inhibitor of Glycine transporter 1

Names
- IUPAC name 2-[Methyl-[(3R)-3-phenyl-3-[4-(trifluoromethyl)phenoxy]propyl]amino]acetic acid

Identifiers
CAS Number	372198-97-5
3D model (JSmol)	Interactive image
ChEMBL	ChEMBL360052
ChemSpider	4470795
IUPHAR/BPS	4600
PubChem CID	5311285
- InChI: InChI=1S/C19H20F3NO3/c1-23(13-18(24)25)12-11-17(14-5-3-2-4-6-14)26-16-9-7-15(8-10-16)19(20,21)22/h2-10,17H,11-13H2,1H3,(H,24,25)/t17-/m1/s1 Key: KZWQAWBTWNPFPW-QGZVFWFLSA-N
- SMILES: CN(CCC(C1=CC=CC=C1)OC2=CC=C(C=C2)C(F)(F)F)CC(=O)O

Properties
Chemical formula	C_{19}H_{20}F_{3}NO_{3}
Molar mass	367.368 g·mol^{−1}
- Except where otherwise noted, data are given for materials in their standard state (at 25 °C [77 °F], 100 kPa). Infobox references

ORG-24598 is a selective inhibitor of the type 1 glycine transporter.

== Potential uses ==
=== Alcohol use disorder ===
A test in rats has shown that combining varenicline, bupropion, and an indirect glycine agonist (such as ORG-24598) could be beneficial for treatment of alcohol use disorder.

=== Schizophrenia ===
Studies have shown that glycine re-uptake inhibitors selective for the type 1 transporter may be useful for the treatment of certain schizophrenia symptoms.
