= PEPA (drug) =

Chemical compound

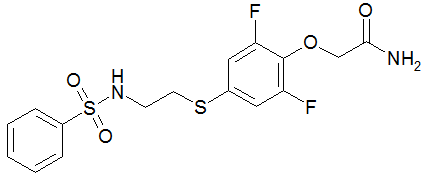

Clinical data
- Other names: PEPA

Legal status
- Legal status: US: Investigational New Drug

Identifiers
- IUPAC name: 2-[2,6-difluoro-4-({2-[(phenylsulfonyl)amino]ethyl}thio)phenoxy]acetamide
- CAS Number: 141286-78-4
- PubChem CID: 6603828
- ChemSpider: 5036138
- UNII: 8S4PR7A8JS
- CompTox Dashboard (EPA): DTXSID60424960

Chemical and physical data
- Formula: C_{16}H_{16}F_{2}N_{2}O_{4}S_{2}
- Molar mass: 402.43 g·mol^{−1}
- 3D model (JSmol): Interactive image
- SMILES: C1=CC=C(C=C1)S(=O)(=O)NCCSC2=CC(=C(C(=C2)F)OCC(=O)N)F

PEPA is a sulfonamide AMPA receptor positive allosteric modulator, which is up to 100 times more potent than aniracetam in vitro. It produces memory-enhancing effects in rats when administered intravenously.

== See also ==
- AMPA receptor positive allosteric modulator
