= Cyclic glycine-proline =

Small neuroactive peptide

Clinical data
- Other names: Cycloprolylglycine; Cyclo-Gly-Pro; Cyclo-Pro-Gly; CGP; Cyclo-GP; Biocovax; Biomedivir; Dexaneurosone; NA-831; NA-81; Nanomedivir; Neurosivir; Traneurocine; (S)-Hexahydropyrrolo[1,2-a]pyrazine-1,4-dione
- Drug class: Neuroprotective; Neurogenesis stimulant; Cognitive enhancer

Pharmacokinetic data
- Elimination half-life: 7 hours

Identifiers
- IUPAC name: (8aS)-2,3,6,7,8,8a-hexahydropyrrolo[1,2-a]pyrazine-1,4-dione
- CAS Number: 3705-27-9
- PubChem CID: 126154
- DrugBank: DB04541
- ChemSpider: 112149
- UNII: W7O69J5F2B
- ChEMBL: ChEMBL360216
- CompTox Dashboard (EPA): DTXSID60914215

Chemical and physical data
- Formula: C_{7}H_{10}N_{2}O_{2}
- Molar mass: 154.169 g·mol^{−1}
- 3D model (JSmol): Interactive image
- SMILES: C1C[C@H]2C(=O)NCC(=O)N2C1
- InChI: InChI=1S/C7H10N2O2/c10-6-4-8-7(11)5-2-1-3-9(5)6/h5H,1-4H2,(H,8,11)/t5-/m0/s1; Key:OWOHLURDBZHNGG-YFKPBYRVSA-N

Cyclic glycine-proline (cGP) is a small neuroactive peptide that belongs to a group of bioactive 2,5-diketopiperazines (2,5-DKPs) and is also known as cyclo-glycine-proline. cGP is a neutral, stable naturally occurring compound and is endogenous to the human body; found in human plasma, breast milk and cerebrospinal fluid. DKPs are bioactive compounds often found in foods. Cyclic dipeptides such as 2,5 DKPs are formed by the cyclisation of two amino acids of linear peptides produced in heated or fermented foods. The bioactivity of cGP is a property of functional foods and presents in several matrices of foods including blackcurrants.

cGP is metabolite of hormone insulin-like growth factor-1 (IGF-1). It has a cyclic structure, lipophilic nature, and is enzymatically stable which makes it a more favorable candidate for manipulating the binding-release process between IGF-1 and its binding protein thereby, normalizing IGF-1 function.

Under the trade name Traneurocin (developmental code name NA-831), it is being developed as a racetam-like drug for the treatment of COVID-19, Alzheimer's disease, fragile X syndrome, Rett syndrome, major depressive disorder, and other neurological disorders. In the case of COVID-19, it is specifically being developed for treatment of COVID-19-induced neuropathy.

== Endogenous synthesis ==
Insulin-like growth factor 1 (IGF-1) is a hormone that is structurally very similar to insulin and mediates the effects of growth hormone (GH) thus affecting metabolism, regeneration, and overall development. The GH-IGF-1 signaling pathway is crucial in the process of vascular remodeling and angiogenesis, i.e., the process of building new blood vessels and thus, helps in maintaining blood circulation in the body. In the brain, IGF-1 is abundant in various cells and regions and research over the years, suggest an imperative role of IGF-1 activity in neurodevelopment making it critical in learning and memory.

The IGF-1 family comprises

- IGF-1,
- IGF receptors (IGF-1R) and
- IGF binding proteins (IGFBP).

The therapeutic applications of IGF-1 are limited due to its poor central uptake and potential side-effects. IGF-1 that is not bound to its binding protein bears a very short half-life and is cleaved by enzymes to form the tripeptide glycine-proline-glutamate (GPE). However, the enzymatic instability of GPE, with a plasma half-life of less than 4 minutes, is further cleaved to produce the final product, cyclic-Glycine-Proline (cGP).

== Biological Role of cGP ==
The hepatic production of IGF-1 is controlled by the growth hormone (GH)-IGF-1 axis. The majority of circulating IGF-1 is not bioavailable because of its affinity and binding to IGF-binding protein (IGFBP), mainly IGFBP3. IGF-1 bioactivity is therefore, tightly regulated through reversible binding with IGFBP3. It is this binding-release process that determines the amount of bioavailable IGF-1 in circulation. IGF-1 that is not bound, is cleaved into an N-terminal tripeptide, glycine-proline-glutamate (GPE) and Des-N-IGF-1. and GPE metabolizes to result in cyclic glycine proline (cGP).

Unbound IGF-1, cleaved at the N-terminal, can be metabolized through a series of downstream enzymatic reactions to cGP. The N-terminal is the binding site of IGF-1 which allows cGP to retain the same binding affinity to IGFBP-3 and thus, regulates the bioavailability of IGF-1 through competitive binding with IGFBP3. An increase in cGP, would increase competitive advantage and thus, increase the amount of circulating and therefore, bioavailable IGF-1.

Research shows that cGP can normalize IGF-1 function under pathophysiological conditions of increased or diminished IGF-1 bioactivity.

In vitro studies show that cGP promoted the activity of IGF-1 when insufficient and inhibited the activity of IGF-1 when in excess.

== Pharmacology ==
=== Pharmacodynamics ===
The mechanism of action of traneurocin is either unknown or undisclosed. However, it has been described as acting as a positive allosteric modulator of the AMPA receptor and has been found to increase brain-derived neurotrophic factor (BDNF) levels. It has also been found to act as a positive allosteric modulator of the GABA_{A} receptor. The drug is described as having neuroprotective, neurogenesis-stimulating, and pro-cognitive or nootropic effects. It has also been reported to have antihypoxic and anxiolytic properties.

=== Pharmacokinetics ===
It is known to be an endogenous compound present at micromolar concentrations in the rat brain and readily crosses the blood–brain barrier.

== Chemistry ==
Chemically, traneurocin is a synthetic cyclized dipeptide composed of the amino acids glycine and proline.

== Potential uses ==
Biologically, cGP is most strongly associated with cognitive benefits, however it also has a role in other biological functions, as outlined below.

=== Cognition ===
Vascular health is critical in maintaining cognitive function. IGF-1 plays an essential role in vascular remodelling of the brain and supports cognitive retention. Metabolic IGF-1 levels tend to reduce with age and this reduction appears to be a major contributor to cognitive impairment in older populations.

Low or deficient IGF-1 levels can be normalized by cGP, restoring its vascular function. Studies evaluating cGP, IGF-1 and IGFBP3 levels suggest that cGP concentration and cGP/IGF-1 molar ratio were positively associated suggesting that older people with higher plasma cGP concentration (and cGP/IGF-1 molar ratio) have better memory/cognitive retention.

=== Hypertension ===
IGF-1 plays a critical role in energy metabolism with deficient IGF-1 levels being implicated in obesity and hypertension.

=== Stroke ===
The role of IGF-1 in supporting recovery from stroke, which is a condition of vascular origin, is reported. A study in 34 stroke patients reported that patients with higher plasma concentration of cGP made better recovery within 3 months than those with lower cGP levels. Further, patients with higher cGP levels also showed lesser neurological deficits.

=== Therapeutic potential ===
Excessive IGF-1 activity promotes tumorigenesis while reduced IGF-1 activity is linked with diseases such as Alzheimer's disease and Parkinson's disease. cGP normalises the autocrine function of IGF-1 under pathological conditions and when there are low levels of cGP in the human body, IGF-1 regulation is compromised. Therefore, it is reasonable to assume that treatment with exogenous cGP could assist with improving IGF-1 implicated health benefits.

== Clinical trials ==
As of September 2024, traneurocin is in phase 3 clinical trials for COVID-19, phase 2 clinical trials for Alzheimer's disease, fragile X syndrome, and Rett syndrome, and phase 1 clinical trials for major depressive disorder. No development has been reported for treatment of other neurological disorders. Traneurocin was first developed, under the name cycloprolylglycine (CPG), in Russia in 1991 as a drug related structurally and pharmacologically to piracetam. Cycloprolylglycine is also related to and known to be the major metabolite of omberacetam (Noopept).

Another drug, vineurocin (NA-704), is also being developed for treatment of Alzheimer's disease. This drug is described as a recombinant growth hormone with neuroprotective and neurogenic effects.

== See also ==
- List of Russian drugs
- Ercanetide (NNZ-2591)
