= Bitopertin =

Chemical compound

Clinical data
- ATC code: none

Identifiers
- IUPAC name: {4-[3-Fluoro-5-(trifluoromethyl)pyridin-2-yl]piperazin-1-yl}{5-(methylsulfonyl)-2-[(1S)-2,2,2-trifluoro-1-methylethoxy]phenyl}methanone
- CAS Number: 845614-11-1
- PubChem CID: 24946690
- IUPHAR/BPS: 7546
- ChemSpider: 25034798
- UNII: Q8L6AN59YY
- KEGG: D10186
- ChEMBL: ChEMBL1169880
- CompTox Dashboard (EPA): DTXSID80233556

Chemical and physical data
- Formula: C_{21}H_{20}F_{7}N_{3}O_{4}S
- Molar mass: 543.46 g·mol^{−1}
- 3D model (JSmol): Interactive image
- SMILES: CC(C(F)(F)F)Oc1ccc(cc1C(=O)N2CCN(CC2)c3c(cc(cn3)C(F)(F)F)F)S(=O)(=O)C
- InChI: InChI=1S/C21H20F7N3O4S/c1-12(20(23,24)25)35-17-4-3-14(36(2,33)34)10-15(17)19(32)31-7-5-30(6-8-31)18-16(22)9-13(11-29-18)21(26,27)28/h3-4,9-12H,5-8H2,1-2H3/t12-/m0/s1; Key:YUUGYIUSCYNSQR-LBPRGKRZSA-N

Bitopertin (developmental code names RG1678; RO-4917838) is a glycine reuptake inhibitor which was under development by Roche as an adjunct to antipsychotics for the treatment of persistent negative symptoms or suboptimally controlled positive symptoms associated with schizophrenia. Research into this indication has been largely halted as a result of disappointing trial results. As of 2024, it is under development for the management of erythropoietic protoporphyria (EPP).

Bitopertin is a glycine transporter 1 (GlyT1) inhibitor that increases levels of the neurotransmitter glycine by inhibiting its reuptake from the synaptic cleft. Glycine acts as a required co-agonist along with glutamate at N-methyl-D-aspartate (NMDA) receptors.

== Erythropoietic protoporphyria ==
Glycine is an early and crucial substrate in the biosynthesis of heme; inhibiting its transport by blocking GlyT1 reduces its availability for heme biosynthesis and this reduces the downstream accumulation of protoporphyrin IX in people with EPP.

== Schizophrenia ==
Dysfunction of NMDA receptors may play a key role in the pathogenesis of schizophrenia and modulation of glutamatergic signalling via increased concentrations of glycine in the synaptic cleft may help potentiate NMDA receptor function and improve the symptoms of schizophrenia.

In a phase II proof-of-concept study, patients on bitopertin experienced a significant improvement in the change of the Negative Symptom Factor Score from baseline within 8 weeks (from −4.86 in the placebo group to −6.65 in the treatment group, p<0.05, per-protocol population). In addition, 83% of patients on bitopertin described an improvement of negative symptoms on the CGI-I1 versus 66% on placebo (p<0.05, per-protocol population).

In January 2014, Roche reported that bitopertin failed to meet its endpoints in two phase III trials assessing its efficacy in reducing negative symptoms of schizophrenia. Subsequently, in April 2014, Roche announced that it was discontinuing all except one of its phase III trials of bitopertin for schizophrenia.

== See also ==
- List of investigational antipsychotics
- ORG-25935
