= ORG-25935 =

Synthetic drug

Identifiers
- IUPAC name: 2-([(1R,2S)-6-Methoxy-1-phenyl-1,2,3,4-tetrahydronaphthalen-2-yl]methyl-methylamino)acetic acid
- CAS Number: 1147011-84-4; HCl: 949588-40-3
- PubChem CID: 11717074
- ChemSpider: 9891795
- UNII: 55L20667O4; HCl: H6MSM69SSM
- CompTox Dashboard (EPA): DTXSID401045253

Chemical and physical data
- Formula: C_{21}H_{25}NO_{3}
- Molar mass: 339.435 g·mol^{−1}
- 3D model (JSmol): Interactive image
- SMILES: O=C(O)CN(C)C[C@@H]2[C@@H](c1c(cc(OC)cc1)CC2)c3ccccc3
- InChI: InChI=1S/C21H25NO3/c1-22(14-20(23)24)13-17-9-8-16-12-18(25-2)10-11-19(16)21(17)15-6-4-3-5-7-15/h3-7,10-12,17,21H,8-9,13-14H2,1-2H3,(H,23,24)/t17-,21+/m1/s1; Key:UEBBYLJZCHTLEG-UTKZUKDTSA-N

ORG-25935, also known as SCH-900435, is a synthetic drug developed by Organon International, which acts as a selective inhibitor of the glycine transporter GlyT-1. In animal tests it reduces alcohol consumption and has analgesic and anticonvulsant effects, but it has mainly been studied for its antipsychotic properties, and in human trials it was shown to effectively counteract the effects of the dissociative drug ketamine.

== See also ==
- Glycine reuptake inhibitor
