= Glycine transporter =

Protein family

Glycine transporters (GlyTs) are plasmalemmal neurotransmitter transporters. They serve to terminate the signaling of glycine by mediating its reuptake from the synaptic cleft back into the presynaptic neurons. There are two glycine transporters: glycine transporter 1 (GlyT1) and glycine transporter 2 (GlyT2).

== See also ==
- Excitatory amino acid transporter
- GABA transporter
- Glycine receptor
- Glycine reuptake inhibitor
