= Glycine reuptake inhibitor =

A glycine reuptake inhibitor (GRI) is a type of drug which inhibits the reuptake of the neurotransmitter glycine by blocking one or more of the glycine transporters (GlyTs). Examples of GRIs include bitopertin (RG1678), iclepertin (BI-425809), ORG-24598, ORG-25935, ALX-5407, and sarcosine, which are selective GlyT1 blockers, and ORG-25435 and N-arachidonylglycine, which are selective GlyT2 blockers. Some weak and/or non-selective GlyT blockers include amoxapine and ethanol (alcohol).

== See also ==
- Reuptake inhibitor
- Glycinergic
- GABA reuptake inhibitor
- Excitatory amino acid reuptake inhibitor
