= CX717 =

Ampakine

Clinical data
- Routes of administration: By mouth, IV
- ATC code: None

Identifiers
- IUPAC name: 5-(Morpholine-4-carbonyl)-2,1,3-benzoxadiazole
- CAS Number: 867276-98-0
- PubChem CID: 3323368
- DrugBank: DB05047
- ChemSpider: 2570822
- UNII: 7I12YTA3QM

Chemical and physical data
- Formula: C_{11}H_{11}N_{3}O_{3}
- Molar mass: 233.227 g·mol^{−1}
- 3D model (JSmol): Interactive image
- SMILES: C1COCCN1C(=O)C2=CC3=NON=C3C=C2
- InChI: InChI=1S/C11H11N3O3/c15-11(14-3-5-16-6-4-14)8-1-2-9-10(7-8)13-17-12-9/h1-2,7H,3-6H2; Key:KFRQROSRKSVROW-UHFFFAOYSA-N

CX717 is an ampakine compound created by Christopher Marrs and Gary Rogers in 1996 at Cortex Pharmaceuticals. It affects the neurotransmitter glutamate, with trials showing the drug improves cognitive functioning and memory.

== Approval process ==
In 2005 the U.S. Food and Drug Administration (FDA) accepted Cortex Pharmaceuticals' Investigational New Drug (IND) application to initiate pilot Phase II clinical trials in the United States.

Also, in 2005, the United States Department of Defense funded a study to look into CX717 and the physiological effects of sleepiness. The study found that rhesus monkeys performed faster and better after receiving the drug, and it counteracted the effects of sleep deprivation.

However, a 2006 study funded by DARPA found that CX717 did not improve cognitive performance in humans subjected to simulated night shift work.

In early March 2006 Cortex reported that, in a small pilot Phase II study, CX717 had demonstrated positive clinical and statistical results on the primary endpoint, the ADHD rating scale and the sub-scales related to attention and hyperactivity which are used for the approval of all currently available ADHD treatments. According to a Cortex Pharmaceuticals press release, "Consistent with all previous studies involving over 220 patients and healthy adults, this study demonstrated that CX717 was safe, well tolerated, and produced no increase in heart rate, blood pressure or other cardiovascular side effects".

In April 2007 Cortex Pharmaceuticals submitted two large data packages to the FDA regarding CX717. One data set went to the FDA's Division of Neurology Drug Products for the treatment of Alzheimer's disease, while the other went to the Division of Psychiatry Products where the company filed a second CX717 IND for the treatment of ADHD. According to a Cortex Pharmaceuticals press release, the submitted data package "provides clear evidence that the specific histopathological changes seen in animal toxicology studies, which previously caused the FDA to put CX717 on clinical hold, is a postmortem fixation artifact and is not found in the tissue of the animal when it is still living".

Roger G Stoll PhD, chief executive officer of Cortex, stated,

"When CX717 was removed from clinical hold on October 6, 2006 by the Neurology Division a dose was permitted for continuing a study in patients with Alzheimer's disease, but that dose was too low to permit the assessment of the drug in patients with ADHD. Further information was needed to better understand the cause of the histopathological changes. We now have a substantial data base which clearly documents the fact that the histological changes of concern occur postmortem when the fixative solution is used to prepare the slides of the tissue specimens."

However, in October 2007 the FDA denied Cortex's IND application for a Phase IIb study of CX717 for treatment of ADHD, based on the same animal toxicology results. Cortex responded by inactivating the application, although it will "continue its plans to develop CX717 for the acute treatment of respiratory depression (RD) and continue its study of CX717 in its Alzheimer's disease PET scan study. Cortex believes that the IND application previously filed with the Division of Neurology Products of the FDA for the treatment of Alzheimer's disease will not be affected by the actions of the DPP." The company hopes that after the use of the compound in treating a high-risk acute condition is approved and well-established, the risks of longer-term use at higher doses, such as for treatment of ADHD, will be shown to be less than the FDA had concluded.

Nearly 20 years later, CX717 has once again been studied in Phase II human trials for ADHD sponsored by a different company, RespireRx Pharmaceuticals.

== Use for reversal of respiratory depression ==
The relatively poor oral bioavailability and blood–brain barrier penetration of CX-717 ultimately led to Cortex abandoning development of the 800 mg oral formulation of CX-717 for ADHD, although research into its action in the brain continues. However the unexpected discovery of the strong respiratory stimulant effects of the ampakine drugs on the pre-Botzinger complex of the brain has led to continued development of an intravenous formulation of CX-717 for use alongside opioid analgesics, along with an oral formulation of CX1739, which is around 3-5× more potent than CX-717 and has better oral bioavailability, and is being trialled for treatment of sleep apnea. Further research has investigated the neurological mechanisms behind the anti-respiratory depressant effects of CX-717, and demonstrated that it can be used in humans alongside opioid drugs to reduce this side effect without affecting analgesia.

== Related ampakines ==
Other AMPAkine drugs from Cortex Pharmaceuticals such as CX-546 and CX-614 have already been researched for use in treating Alzheimer's disease and ADHD. These drugs were reasonably effective at reducing the symptoms of Alzheimer's and it was hoped that they could also slow the progression of the disease, but both CX-546 and CX-614 have poor bioavailability, and are only active at very high doses of 1000 mg or more. CX-717 and CX-1739 are newer and more potent drugs in the same series.

== See also ==
- AMPA receptor positive allosteric modulator
