= CACNG2 =

Protein found in humans

Identifiers
- Aliases: CACNG2, MRD10, calcium voltage-gated channel auxiliary subunit gamma 2
- External IDs: OMIM: 602911; MGI: 1316660; GeneCards: CACNG2
Available structures
PDB	Ortholog search: PDBe RCSB
PDB	List of PDB id codes 3JXT

Gene location (Human)
Chr.	Chromosome 22 (human)
Band	22q12.3	Start	36,560,857 bp
Band	22q12.3	End	36,703,752 bp

Gene location (Mouse)
Chr.	Chromosome 15 (mouse)
Band	15 E1|15 36.92 cM	Start	77,875,948 bp
Band	15 E1|15 36.92 cM	End	78,004,228 bp
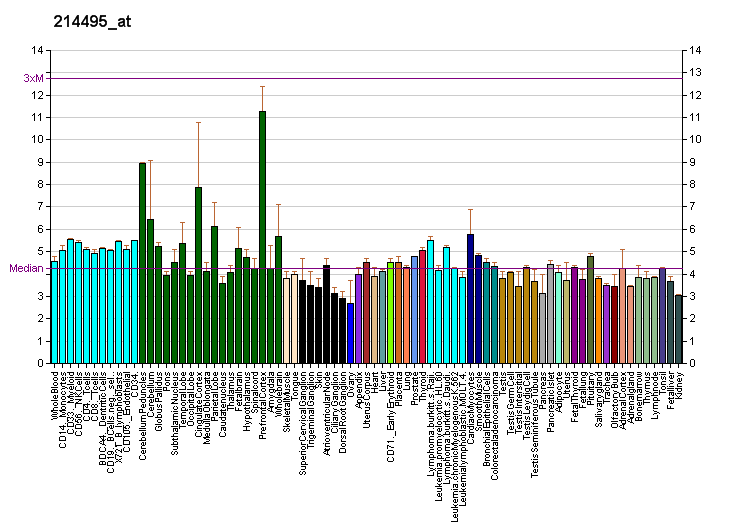
RNA expression pattern
Bgee	Human / Mouse (ortholog); Top expressed in: right hemisphere of cerebellum; postcentral gyrus; Brodmann area 46; superior frontal gyrus; prefrontal cortex; right frontal lobe; dorsolateral prefrontal cortex; entorhinal cortex; Brodmann area 9; anterior cingulate cortex / Top expressed in: anterior horn of spinal cord; lumbar subsegment of spinal cord; cerebellar vermis; lobe of cerebellum; medulla oblongata; medial dorsal nucleus; primary motor cortex; medial vestibular nucleus; facial motor nucleus; medial geniculate nucleus; More reference expression data
BioGPS	More reference expression data
Gene ontology
Molecular function	voltage-gated ion channel activity; protein binding; channel regulator activity; calcium channel activity; voltage-gated calcium channel activity; ionotropic glutamate receptor binding
Cellular component	voltage-gated calcium channel complex; integral component of membrane; endocytic vesicle membrane; membrane; plasma membrane; AMPA glutamate receptor complex; cell junction; neuron projection; synapse; postsynaptic density membrane; somatodendritic compartment; cytosol; cell surface; postsynaptic density; cerebellar mossy fiber; Schaffer collateral - CA1 synapse; hippocampal mossy fiber to CA3 synapse; glutamatergic synapse; integral component of postsynaptic density membrane
Biological process	membrane hyperpolarization; transmission of nerve impulse; regulation of membrane potential; regulation of ion transmembrane transport; membrane depolarization; nervous system process; ion transport; regulation of AMPA receptor activity; neuromuscular junction development; calcium ion transport; calcium ion transmembrane transport; neurotransmitter receptor transport, postsynaptic endosome to lysosome; postsynaptic neurotransmitter receptor diffusion trapping; neurotransmitter receptor internalization; protein targeting to membrane; response to calcium ion; eye blink reflex; positive regulation of protein localization to basolateral plasma membrane; positive regulation of AMPA receptor activity; regulation of postsynaptic membrane neurotransmitter receptor levels; neurotransmitter receptor localization to postsynaptic specialization membrane; positive regulation of synaptic transmission, glutamatergic; cardiac conduction
Sources:Amigo / QuickGO
Orthologs
Databases	NCBI: entry; OMA: entry
Species	Human	Mouse
Entrez	10369	12300
Ensembl	ENSG00000166862	ENSMUSG00000019146
UniProt	Q9Y698	O88602
RefSeq (mRNA)	NM_006078; NM_001379051	NM_007583
RefSeq (protein)	NP_006069; NP_001365980	NP_031609
Location (UCSC)	Chr 22: 36.56 – 36.7 Mb	Chr 15: 77.88 – 78 Mb
PubMed search
- Wikidata
View/Edit Human	View/Edit Mouse

Calcium channel, voltage-dependent, gamma subunit 2, also known as CACNG2 or stargazin, is a protein that in humans is encoded by the CACNG2 gene.

== Function ==
L-type calcium channels are composed of five subunits. The protein encoded by this gene represents one of these subunits, gamma, and is one of several gamma subunit proteins. It is an integral membrane protein that is thought to stabilize the calcium channel in an inactive (closed) state. This protein is similar to the mouse stargazin protein, mutations in which having been associated with absence seizures, also known as petit-mal or spike-wave seizures. This gene is a member of the neuronal calcium channel gamma subunit gene subfamily of the PMP-22/EMP/MP20 family.

Stargazin is involved in the transportation of AMPA receptors to the synaptic membrane, and the regulation of their receptor rate constants — via its extracellular domain — once it is there. As it is highly expressed throughout the cerebral cortex, it is likely to have an important role in learning within these areas, due to the importance of AMPA receptors in LTP.

== Clinical significance ==
Disruptions of CACNG2 have been implicated in autism.

== Interactions ==
CACNG2 has been shown to interact with GRIA4, DLG4, and MAGI2.

== See also ==
- Voltage-dependent calcium channel
