= Cyclothiazide =

Chemical compound

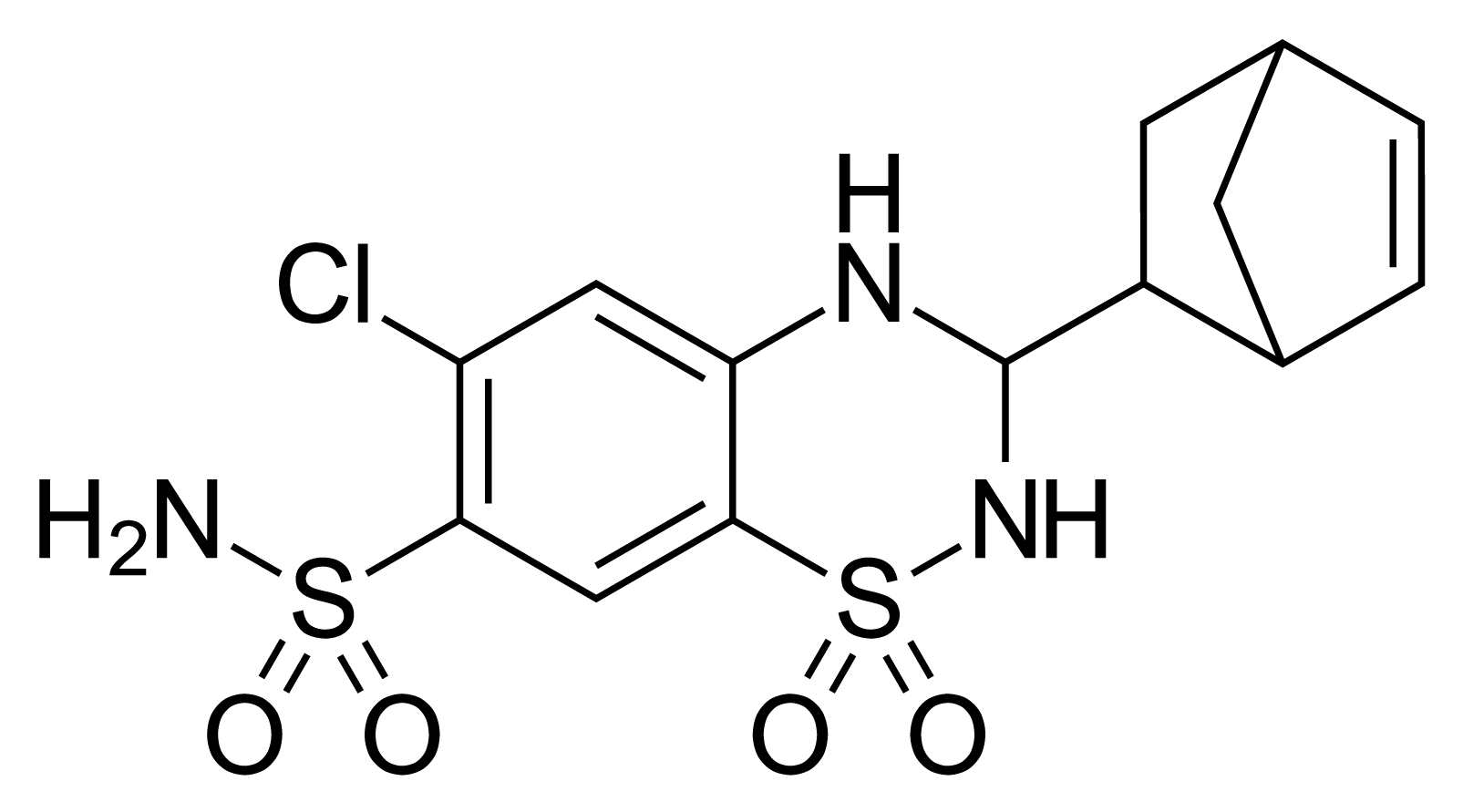

Clinical data
- ATC code: C03AA09 (WHO)

Legal status
- Legal status: In general: ℞ (Prescription only)

Identifiers
- IUPAC name: 3-(bicyclo[2.2.1]hept-5-en-2-yl)-6-chloro-1,1-dioxo-1,2,3,4-tetrahydro-1λ^{6},2,4-benzothiadiazine-7-sulfonamide
- CAS Number: 2259-96-3
- PubChem CID: 2910
- IUPHAR/BPS: 4167
- DrugBank: DB00606
- ChemSpider: 4535011
- UNII: P71U09G5BW
- KEGG: D01256
- ChEMBL: ChEMBL61593
- CompTox Dashboard (EPA): DTXSID3022871
- ECHA InfoCard: 100.017.146

Chemical and physical data
- Formula: C_{14}H_{16}ClN_{3}O_{4}S_{2}
- Molar mass: 389.87 g·mol^{−1}
- 3D model (JSmol): Interactive image
- SMILES: O=S(=O)(c1c(Cl)cc2c(c1)S(=O)(=O)NC(N2)C4[C@@H]3\C=C/[C@@H](C3)C4)N
- InChI: InChI=1S/C14H16ClN3O4S2/c15-10-5-11-13(6-12(10)23(16,19)20)24(21,22)18-14(17-11)9-4-7-1-2-8(9)3-7/h1-2,5-9,14,17-18H,3-4H2,(H2,16,19,20)/t7-,8+,9?,14?/m0/s1; Key:BOCUKUHCLICSIY-QJWLJZLASA-N

Cyclothiazide (Anhydron, Acquirel, Doburil, Fluidil, Renazide, Tensodiural, Valmiran), sometimes abbreviated CTZ, is a benzothiadiazide (thiazide) diuretic and antihypertensive that was originally introduced in the United States in 1963 by Eli Lilly and was subsequently also marketed in Europe and Japan. Related drugs include diazoxide, hydrochlorothiazide, and chlorothiazide.

In 1993, it was discovered that cyclothiazide is a positive allosteric modulator of the AMPA and kainate receptors, capable of reducing or essentially eliminating rapid desensitization of the former receptor, and potentiating AMPA-mediated glutamate currents by as much as 18-fold at the highest concentration tested (100 μM). Additionally, in 2003, cyclothiazide was also found to act as a GABA_{A} receptor negative allosteric modulator, potently inhibiting GABA_{A}-mediated currents. In animals it is a powerful convulsant, robustly enhancing epileptiform activity and inducing seizures, but without producing any apparent neuronal death.

Cyclothiazide has been found to act as a non-competitive antagonist of the mGluR1. It is selective for mGluR1 over other metabotropic glutamate receptors.

== Synthesis ==
Cyclothiazide synthesis:

== See also ==
- AMPA receptor positive allosteric modulator
