= LY-503430 =

Chemical compound

Clinical data
- Other names: LY-503430; (R)-4'-[1-fluoro-1-methyl-2-(propane-2-sulfonylamino)-ethyl]-biphenyl-4-carboxylic acid methylamide
- Routes of administration: Oral

Legal status
- Legal status: US: Investigational New Drug

Identifiers
- IUPAC name: 4'-{(1S)-1-fluoro-2-[(isopropylsulfonyl)amino]-1-methylethyl}-N-methylbiphenyl-4-carboxamide
- CAS Number: 625820-83-9
- PubChem CID: 9952446
- ChemSpider: 8128056
- UNII: 3NKZ7DGF3R

Chemical and physical data
- Formula: C_{20}H_{25}FN_{2}O_{3}S
- Molar mass: 392.49 g·mol^{−1}
- 3D model (JSmol): Interactive image
- SMILES: CC(C)S(=O)(=O)NCC(F)(C)c(cc2)ccc2-c(cc1)ccc1C(=O)NC
- InChI: InChI=1S/C20H25FN2O3S/c1-14(2)27(25,26)23-13-20(3,21)18-11-9-16(10-12-18)15-5-7-17(8-6-15)19(24)22-4/h5-12,14,23H,13H2,1-4H3,(H,22,24)/t20-/m0/s1; Key:MFJKNXILEXBWNQ-FQEVSTJZSA-N

LY-503430 is an AMPA receptor positive allosteric modulator developed by Eli Lilly.

LY-503430 produces both nootropic and neuroprotective effects, reducing brain damage caused by 6-hydroxydopamine or MPTP and also increasing levels of the neurotrophic factor BDNF in the brain, particularly in the substantia nigra, hippocampus, and striatum. It is orally active and the main application it is currently being developed for is treatment of Parkinson's disease, although it has also been proposed to be useful in the treatment of Alzheimer's disease, depression, and schizophrenia.

== See also ==
- AMPA receptor positive allosteric modulator
