= Iclepertin =

Chemical compound

Clinical data
- Other names: BI 425809

Legal status
- Legal status: Investigational

Identifiers
- CAS Number: 1421936-85-7
- PubChem CID: 155259577
- UNII: M43ZDU10DD

Chemical and physical data
- Formula: C_{20}H_{18}F_{6}N_{2}O_{5}S
- Molar mass: 512.42 g·mol^{−1}

Iclepertin (developmental code name BI 425809) is an investigational nootropic to enhance the cognition and functional capacity in schizophrenia developed by Boehringer Ingelheim. As of May 2020, it is in phase III of clinical trial under the code name CONNEX-3. BI 425809 is an inhibitor of glycine transporter 1 (Gly-T1) that in phase II improved cognition after 12 weeks in patients with schizophrenia. Doses of 10 mg and 25 mg showed the largest separation from placebo. If these encouraging results are confirmed in phase 3 trials, BI 425809 could provide an effective treatment for cognitive impairment associated with schizophrenia. Schizophrenia is characterized by abnormalities in glutamatergic pathways related to NMDA receptor hypofunction. Inhibition of GlyT1 on the presynaptic membrane or astrocytes is hypothesized to increase glycine levels within the synapse. The NMDA receptor function may be enhanced by increasing levels of its co-agonist, glycine, within the synaptic cleft, which may lead to improvements in cognitive function.

In January 2025, Boehringer Ingelheim announced that the phase 3 program CONNEX missed both the primary and key secondary endpoints. When compared to placebo at six months, patients receiving the Iclepertin drug do not have statistically significant effects in improving cognitive impairment. The laboratory announced stopping a related long-term extension study.

== See also ==
- List of investigational antipsychotics
- List of investigational cognition and memory disorder drugs
