= LY-404187 =

Chemical compound

Clinical data
- Other names: LY-404,187; N-2-[4-(4-cyanophenyl)phenyl]propyl-2-propanesulfonamide
- ATC code: none

Legal status
- Legal status: US: Investigational New Drug

Identifiers
- IUPAC name: N-[2-(4'-cyanobiphenyl-4-yl)propyl]propane-2-sulfonamide
- CAS Number: 211311-95-4
- ChemSpider: 18962921
- UNII: 75W6I8W6OU
- CompTox Dashboard (EPA): DTXSID00432983

Chemical and physical data
- Formula: C_{19}H_{22}N_{2}O_{2}S
- Molar mass: 342.46 g·mol^{−1}
- 3D model (JSmol): Interactive image
- SMILES: N#Cc2ccc(cc2)-c1ccc(C(C)CNS(=O)(=O)C(C)C)cc1
- InChI: InChI=1S/C19H28N2O2S/c1-14(2)24(22,23)21-13-15(3)17-8-10-19(11-9-17)18-6-4-16(12-20)5-7-18/h4-7,14-15,17,19,21H,8-11,13H2,1-3H3; Key:AIALBPYHYGYYRB-UHFFFAOYSA-N

LY-404187 is an AMPA receptor positive allosteric modulator which was developed by Eli Lilly and Company. It is a member of the biarylpropylsulfonamide class of AMPA receptor potentiators.

LY-404187 has been demonstrated to enhance cognitive function in animal studies, and has also shown effects suggesting antidepressant action as well as having possible application in the treatment of schizophrenia, Parkinson's disease and ADHD. These effects appear to be mediated through multiple mechanisms of action secondary to AMPA receptor potentiation, with a prominent effect seen in research being increased levels of BDNF in the brain. It may therefore be continued on to human trials, although Eli Lilly has developed a whole family of biarylpropylsulfonamide derivatives and it is unclear at this stage which compound is most likely to be selected for further development.

== See also ==
- AMPA receptor positive allosteric modulator
