= CX614 =

Chemical compound

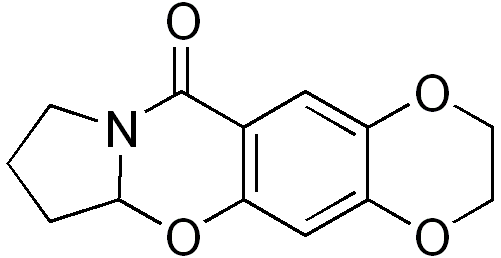

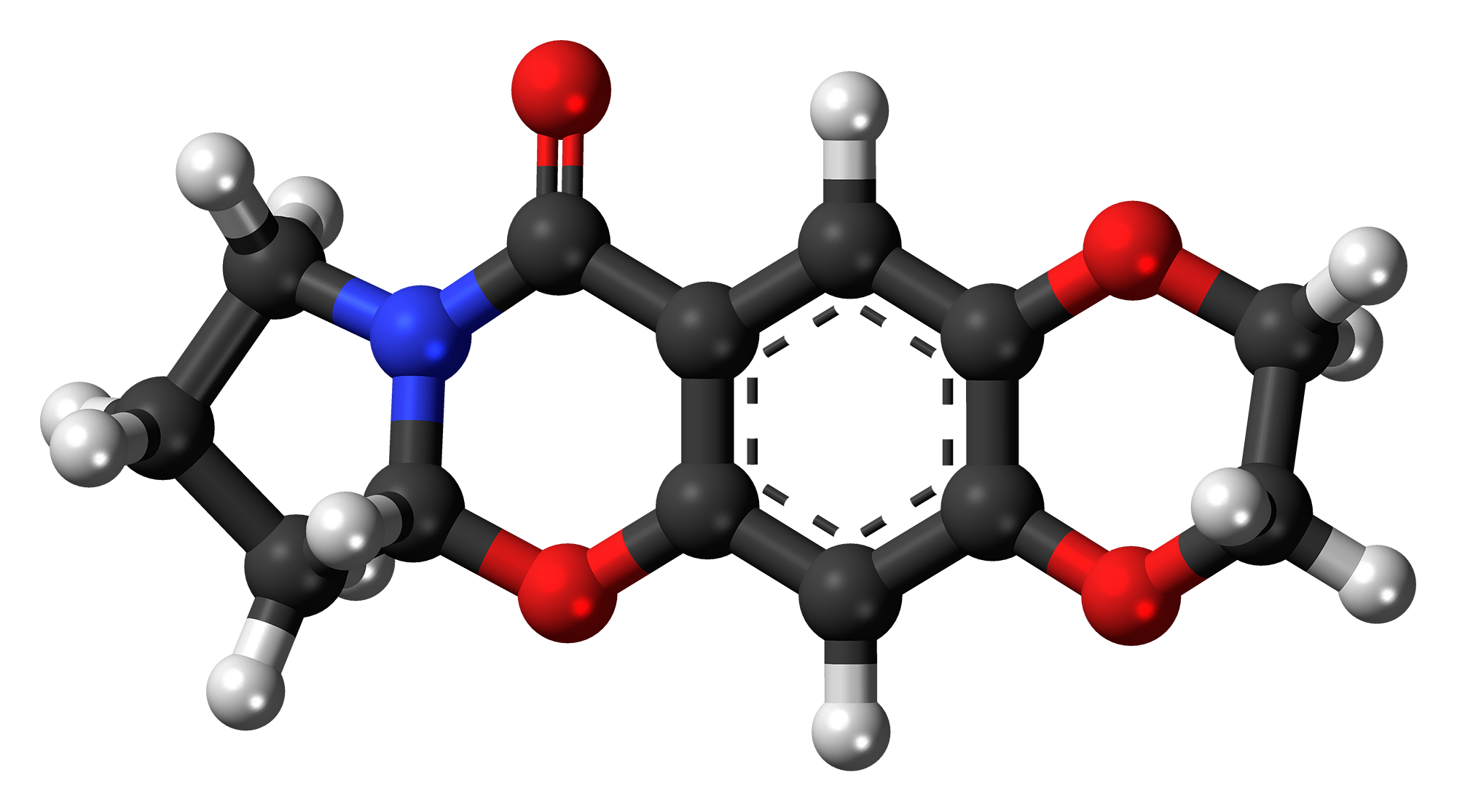

Clinical data
- Other names: CX-614

Legal status
- Legal status: US: Investigational New Drug

Identifiers
- IUPAC name: 2H,3H,6aH-pyrrolidino(2,1-3',2')1,3-oxazino(6',5'-5,4)benzo(e)1,4-dioxan-10-one
- CAS Number: 191744-13-5
- PubChem CID: 6451148
- IUPHAR/BPS: 7842
- ChemSpider: 4953628
- UNII: 87V631480W
- CompTox Dashboard (EPA): DTXSID30912324

Chemical and physical data
- Formula: C_{13}H_{13}NO_{4}
- Molar mass: 247.250 g·mol^{−1}
- 3D model (JSmol): Interactive image
- SMILES: C1CC2N(C1)C(=O)C3=CC4=C(C=C3O2)OCCO4
- InChI: InChI=1S/C13H13NO4/c15-13-8-6-10-11(17-5-4-16-10)7-9(8)18-12-2-1-3-14(12)13/h6-7,12H,1-5H2; Key:RQEPVMAYUINZRE-UHFFFAOYSA-N

CX-614 is an ampakine drug developed by Cortex Pharmaceuticals. It has been investigated for its effect on AMPA receptors.

Chronic CX-614 treatments produce rapid increases in the synthesis of the brain-derived neurotrophic factor BDNF which has very important effects on synaptic plasticity and may have applications in the treatment of neurodegenerative diseases such as Alzheimer's disease.

Acute CX-614 treatments activate local mRNA translation (new protein synthesis) within dendrites and this is mediated by a fast upregulation of BDNF release. CX-614-dependent release of BDNF rapidly increases translation of proteins that are important for synaptic plasticity such as ARC/Arg3.1 and CaMKIIalpha.

CX-614 has also been proposed as a treatment for conditions such as depression and schizophrenia, but produces receptor downregulation following chronic administration, which might limit the potential for extended use.

However, downregulation of AMPA receptors with prolonged CX-614 administration can be avoided by designing and using short and intermittent treatment protocols, which could still upregulate BDNF protein levels without reducing the levels of AMPA receptors.

Importantly, such short and intermittent treatment protocols are neuroprotective against neurotoxicity induced with MPTP and MPP^{+} in cultured midbrain (mesencephalic) and hippocampal organotypic slices.

These results uncovered the neuroprotective effects of CX-614 and indicated that opened the way for further experimentation with CX-614 as an important new treatment for Parkinson's disease and Alzheimer's disease.

CX-614 has also been shown to reduce the behavioural effects of methamphetamine in mice, and may have application in the treatment of stimulant abuse.

== See also ==
- AMPA receptor positive allosteric modulator
