= CX-516 =

Chemical compound

Clinical data
- Trade names: Ampalex

Pharmacokinetic data
- Elimination half-life: 45 minutes

Identifiers
- IUPAC name: 6-(Piperidin-1-ylcarbonyl)quinoxaline
- CAS Number: 154235-83-3
- PubChem CID: 148184
- IUPHAR/BPS: 4165
- ChemSpider: 130635
- UNII: Z5QU38B4V9
- KEGG: C13675
- ChEMBL: ChEMBL136800
- CompTox Dashboard (EPA): DTXSID70165574
- ECHA InfoCard: 100.237.047

Chemical and physical data
- Formula: C_{14}H_{15}N_{3}O
- Molar mass: 241.294 g·mol^{−1}
- 3D model (JSmol): Interactive image
- SMILES: O=C(c2cc1nccnc1cc2)N3CCCCC3
- InChI: InChI=1S/C14H15N3O/c18-14(17-8-2-1-3-9-17)11-4-5-12-13(10-11)16-7-6-15-12/h4-7,10H,1-3,8-9H2; Key:ANDGGVOPIJEHOF-UHFFFAOYSA-N

CX-516 is an ampakine and nootropic that acts as an AMPA receptor positive allosteric modulator and had been undergoing development by a collaboration between Cortex, Shire, and Servier. It was studied as a potential treatment for Alzheimer's disease under the brand name Ampalex, and was also being examined as a treatment for ADHD.

CX-516 was the first ampakine compound developed by Cortex and while it showed good in vitro activity and positive results in animal tests, the human trials proved disappointing due mainly to low potency and short half-life. However, CX-516 is still widely used in animal research into the ampakine drugs and is the standard reference compound that newer, more potent drugs of this class such as farampator and CX-717 are compared to.

== See also ==
- AMPA receptor positive allosteric modulator
