= Farampator =

Chemical compound

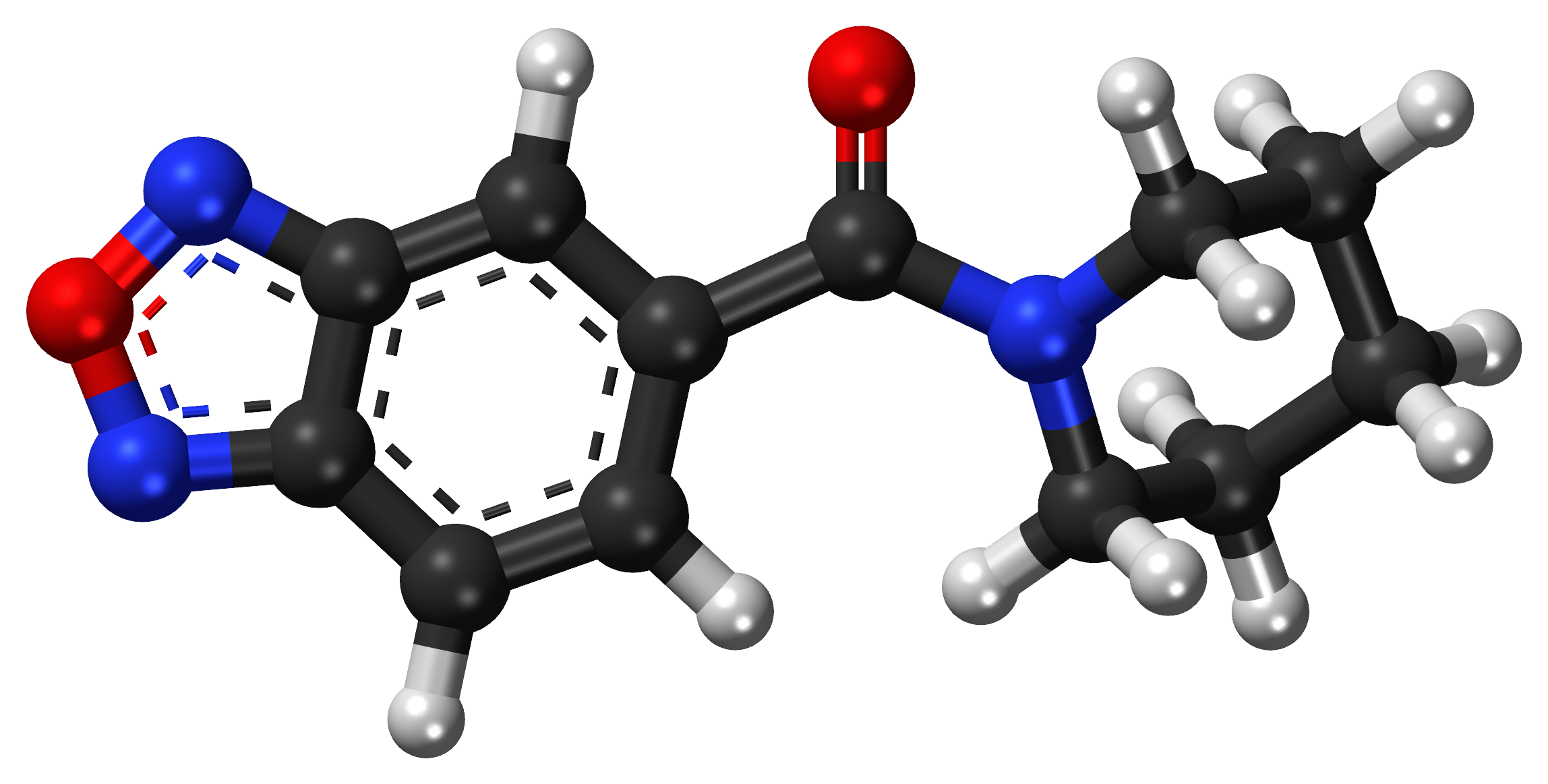

Clinical data
- Other names: CX-691; ORG-24448

Legal status
- Legal status: US: Investigational New Drug

Identifiers
- IUPAC name: 2,1,3-benzoxadiazol-6-yl-piperidin-1-ylmethanone
- CAS Number: 211735-76-1
- PubChem CID: 4118151
- DrugBank: DB15012
- ChemSpider: 3331565
- UNII: 7X6P5N8K2L
- KEGG: D04131
- CompTox Dashboard (EPA): DTXSID90175413

Chemical and physical data
- Formula: C_{12}H_{13}N_{3}O_{2}
- Molar mass: 231.255 g·mol^{−1}
- 3D model (JSmol): Interactive image
- SMILES: C1CCN(CC1)C(=O)C2=CC3=NON=C3C=C2
- InChI: InChI=1S/C12H13N3O2/c16-12(15-6-2-1-3-7-15)9-4-5-10-11(8-9)14-17-13-10/h4-5,8H,1-3,6-7H2; Key:XFVRBYKKGGDPAJ-UHFFFAOYSA-N

Farampator (developmental code names CX-691, ORG-24448, SCH-900460) is an ampakine drug. It was developed by Cortex Pharmaceuticals, and licensed to Organon BioSciences for commercial development. Following the purchase of Organon by Schering-Plough in 2007, the development license to farampator was transferred. The development of farampator was eventually terminated, reportedly due to concerns about cardiac toxicity.

Farampator has been investigated for its effect on AMPA receptors and researched for potential use in the treatment of schizophrenia and Alzheimer's disease. It was found to improve short-term memory, but impaired episodic memory. It produced side effects such as headache, somnolence and nausea. Subjects reporting side effects had significantly higher plasma levels of farampator than subjects without. Additional analyses revealed that in the farampator condition the group without side effects showed a significantly superior memory performance relative to the group with side effects.

== See also ==
- AMPA receptor positive allosteric modulator
- List of investigational antidepressants
- List of investigational antipsychotics
