= RespireRx =

Pharmaceutical company

RespireRx Pharmaceuticals Inc. (until 2015 Cortex Pharmaceuticals, Inc.) (OTC Pink Current: RSPI) is a pharmaceutical company based in Glen Rock, New Jersey specializing in positive allosteric modulators of the AMPA receptor known as Ampakines and cannabinoids.

== History ==
In February 2005, Cortex received U.S. Food and Drug Administration approval to begin Phase II clinical trials for CX717 for use as a treatment for Alzheimer’s, ADHD and Sleep disorders.
In 2006, The FDA halted clinical trials for CX717 because they feared the drug was toxic. They later allowed testing to continue but at doses too low to have any effect.
In July 2007, The FDA gave Cortex permission to continue with clinical trials for CX717, as a treatment for Alzheimer's disease.
In September 2007, Cortex filed with the FDA to test CX717 as a treatment for ADHD.
In October 2007, Dr. Pierre Tran became Chief Medical Officer at Cortex after the FDA refused to let the company proceed with Phase II clinical trials for CX717 as a treatment for ADHD.
In March 2008, German regulators approved clinical studies for using CX717 to prevent breathing problems caused by opiate pain-killers. In May 2008, President and CEO Dr. Roger Stoll announced that he was resigning and would be replaced by Mark Varney. In March 2013, Dr. Arnold S. Lippa, was named chairman, President, and CEO, taking over leadership of the company. In August 2015, Dr. James S. Manuso, was appointed president, CEO, and Vice Chairman. Dr. Manuso led the company until his resignation on September 30, 2018. Following his departure, Dr. Arnold S. Lippa returned to the leadership team as Interim Chief Executive Officer and Interim President on October 12, 2018, positions he held until May 6, 2020. Timothy Jones assumed the roles of President and CEO until January 31, 2022. Currently, Dr. Arnold S. Lippa is Interim CEO and Interim President, while continuing to serve as Executive Chairman and Chief Scientific Officer (as of 2025).

On June 13, 2018, RespireRx Pharmaceuticals Inc. entered into a letter of intent with Noramco Inc., a producer of controlled substances bulk APIs for the pharmaceutical industry, pursuant to which the parties have entered into a 90-day period, during which they will negotiate a definitive agreement regarding the RespireRx's development of dronabinol, a synthetic cannabinoid, also known as Δ9-tetrahydrocannabinol or Δ9-THC.

As of October 2025, none of the company's drug candidates have received regulatory approval (latest Form 10-K report December 2022).
