= Sodium- and chloride-dependent glycine transporter 1 =

Protein found in humans

SLC6A9

Identifiers
- Aliases: SLC6A9, GLYT1, Glycine transporter 1, solute carrier family 6 member 9, GCENSG
- External IDs: OMIM: 601019; MGI: 95760; GeneCards: SLC6A9

Gene location (Human)
Chr.	Chromosome 1 (human)
Band	1p34.1	Start	43,991,500 bp
Band	1p34.1	End	44,031,467 bp

Gene location (Mouse)
Chr.	Chromosome 4 (mouse)
Band	4 D1|4 53.62 cM	Start	117,691,703 bp
Band	4 D1|4 53.62 cM	End	117,732,395 bp
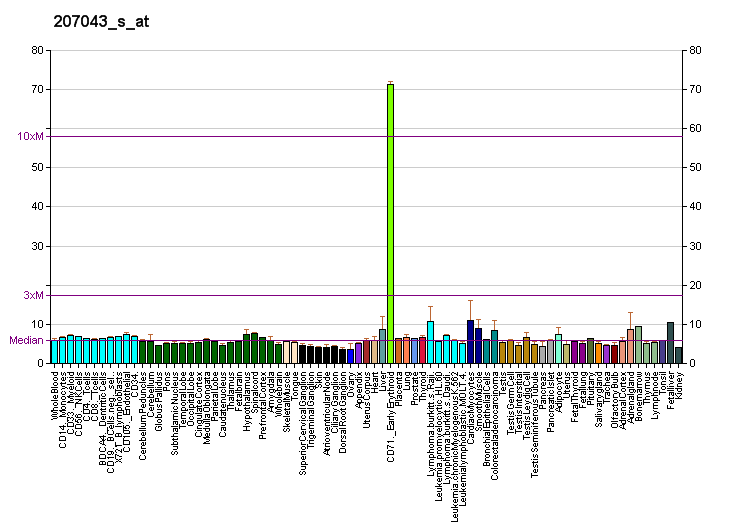
RNA expression pattern
Bgee	Human / Mouse (ortholog); Top expressed in: C1 segment; skin of leg; skin of abdomen; right adrenal gland; stromal cell of endometrium; left adrenal gland; right adrenal cortex; left adrenal cortex; mucosa of transverse colon; mucosa of esophagus / Top expressed in: neural layer of retina; secondary oocyte; retinal pigment epithelium; fetal liver hematopoietic progenitor cell; deep cerebellar nuclei; primary oocyte; zygote; lumbar subsegment of spinal cord; medulla oblongata; dorsal tegmental nucleus; More reference expression data
BioGPS	More reference expression data
Gene ontology
Molecular function	neurotransmitter:sodium symporter activity; amino acid:sodium symporter activity; glycine transmembrane transporter activity; symporter activity; glycine:sodium symporter activity; transporter activity
Cellular component	integral component of membrane; plasma membrane; membrane; presynapse; integral component of plasma membrane; postsynaptic density; integral component of synaptic vesicle membrane; asymmetric synapse; hippocampal mossy fiber to CA3 synapse; parallel fiber to Purkinje cell synapse; integral component of postsynaptic membrane; integral component of presynaptic membrane
Biological process	amino acid transmembrane transport; neurotransmitter transport; amino acid transport; glycine secretion, neurotransmission; glycine transport; organic acid transmembrane transport; transmembrane transport; regulation of synaptic transmission, glycinergic
Sources:Amigo / QuickGO
Orthologs
Databases	NCBI: entry; OMA: entry
Species	Human	Mouse
Entrez	6536	14664
Ensembl	ENSG00000196517	ENSMUSG00000028542
UniProt	P48067	P28571
RefSeq (mRNA)	NM_001024845; NM_001261380; NM_006934; NM_201649; NM_001328626 NM_001328627; NM_001328628; NM_001328629; NM_001328630	NM_008135; NM_001355175; NM_001369016; NM_001369017
RefSeq (protein)	NP_001020016; NP_001248309; NP_001315555; NP_001315556; NP_001315557 NP_001315558; NP_001315559; NP_008865; NP_964012	NP_032161; NP_001342104; NP_001355945; NP_001355946
Location (UCSC)	Chr 1: 43.99 – 44.03 Mb	Chr 4: 117.69 – 117.73 Mb
PubMed search
- Wikidata
View/Edit Human	View/Edit Mouse

Sodium- and chloride-dependent glycine transporter 1, also known as glycine transporter 1, is a protein that in humans is encoded by the SLC6A9 gene which is promising therapeutic target for treatment of diabetes and obesity.

== Selective inhibitors ==
Elevation of extracellular synaptic glycine concentration by blockade of GlyT1 has been hypothesized to potentiate NMDA receptor function in vivo and to represent a rational approach for the treatment of schizophrenia and cognitive disorders. Several drug candidates have reached clinical trials.

- ASP2535
- Bitopertin (RG1678), which has entered phase II trials for the treatment of schizophrenia
- Iclepertin (BI 425809) by Boehringer Ingelheim which is thought to improve cognitive impairment due to schizophrenia
- Org 25935 (Sch 900435)
- PF-03463275 (in phase II trial)
- Pesampator (PF-04958242) by Pfizer
- Sarcosine which is thought to improve cognitive impairment due to schizophrenia

== Pathological mutations ==
Mutations of the gene may cause a severe metabolic disorder discovered in 2016 and called glycine encephalopathy with normal serum glycine (OMIM 617301), also known as GlyT1 encephalopathy.

== See also ==
- Sodium:neurotransmitter symporter
- Solute carrier family
