= Glutamate (neurotransmitter) =

Anion of glutamic acid in its role as a neurotransmitter

l-Glutamate
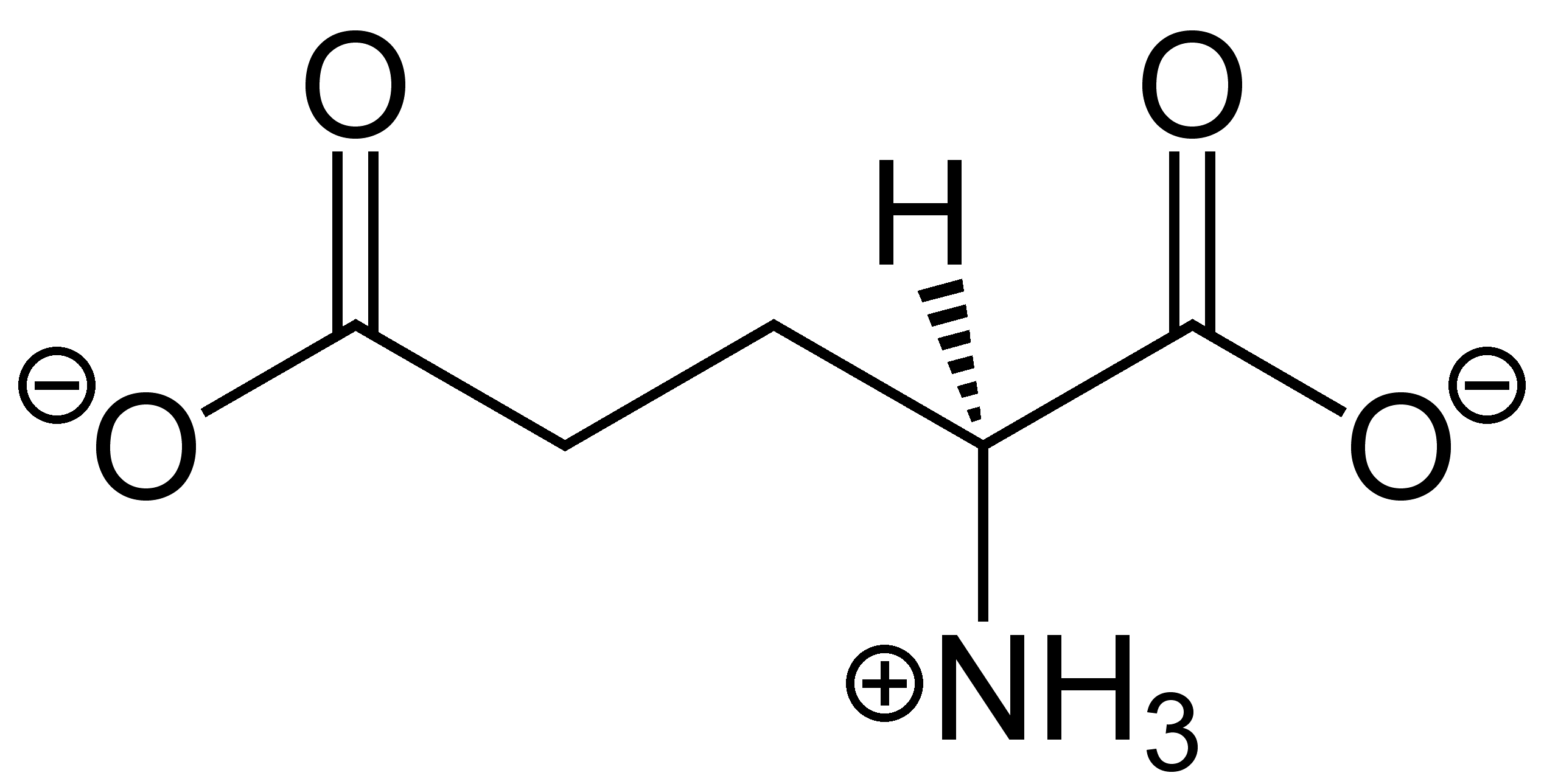

Clinical data
- Other names: Glutamic acid, GLU (abbreviation), L-(+)-glutamate

Physiological data
- Source tissues: almost every part of the nervous system
- Target tissues: system-wide
- Receptors: NMDA, AMPA, kainate, mGluR
- Agonists: NMDA, AMPA, kainic acid
- Antagonists: AP5, ketamine, CNQX, kynurenic acid
- Precursor: mainly dietary sources
- Metabolism: glutamate dehydrogenase

Identifiers
- IUPAC name: [(1S)-1,3-dicarboxypropyl]azanium
- CAS Number: 56-86-0
- PubChem CID: 5147171
- IUPHAR/BPS: 1369
- ChemSpider: 591
- UNII: 3KX376GY7L
- KEGG: C00025

Chemical and physical data
- Formula: C_{5}H_{8}NO_{4}^{−}
- Molar mass: 146.122 g·mol^{−1}

Glutamate (known as glutamic acid in its protonated form) is the chief excitatory neurotransmitter (a chemical that nerve cells use to send signals to other cells).

Glutamate is by a wide margin the most abundant excitatory neurotransmitter in the vertebrate nervous system. It is used by every major excitatory function in the vertebrate brain, estimated to account for 90% of the synaptic connections in the human brain. It also serves as the primary neurotransmitter for some localized brain regions, such as cerebellum granule cells.

Biochemical receptors for glutamate fall into two major classes, known as ionotropic glutamate receptors and metabotropic glutamate receptors. The ionotropic glutamate receptors consist of AMPA receptors, NMDA receptors, and kainate receptors. The metabotropic glutamate receptors consist of eight different individual receptors, being split into group I, group II, and group III.

Because of its role in synaptic plasticity, glutamate is involved in cognitive functions such as learning and memory in the brain. The form of plasticity known as long-term potentiation takes place at glutamatergic synapses in the hippocampus, neocortex, and other parts of the brain. Glutamate works not only as a point-to-point transmitter, but also through spill-over synaptic crosstalk between synapses in which summation of glutamate released from a neighboring synapse creates extrasynaptic signaling/volume transmission. In addition, glutamate plays important roles in the regulation of growth cones and synaptogenesis during brain development.

== Glutamatergic neurotransmission ==
=== Synthesis and vesicular release ===
Glutamate is a constituent of a wide variety of proteins; consequently it is one of the most abundant amino acids in the human body. Glutamate is formally classified as a non-essential amino acid, because it can be synthesized (in sufficient quantities for health) from α-ketoglutaric acid, which is produced as part of the citric acid cycle by a series of reactions whose starting point is citrate. Glutamate cannot cross the blood–brain barrier unassisted, but it is actively transported out of the nervous system by a high affinity transport system, which maintains its concentration in brain fluids at a fairly constant level.

Glutamate is synthesized in the central nervous system from glutamine as part of the glutamate–glutamine cycle by the enzyme glutaminase. This can occur in the presynaptic neuron or in neighboring glial cells.

Glutamate itself serves as metabolic precursor for the neurotransmitter GABA, via the action of the enzyme glutamate decarboxylase.

=== Receptors and signaling ===
Glutamate exerts its effects by binding to and activating cell surface receptors. In mammals, four families of glutamate receptors have been identified, known as AMPA receptors, kainate receptors, NMDA receptors, and metabotropic glutamate receptors. The first three families are ionotropic, meaning that when activated they open membrane channels that allow ions to pass through. The metabotropic family are G protein-coupled receptors, meaning that they exert their effects via a complex second messenger system.

Glutamate receptors in the mammal brain
Family	Type	Mechanism
AMPA	Ionotropic	Increase membrane permeability for sodium and potassium
kainate	Ionotropic	Increase membrane permeability for sodium and potassium
NMDA	Ionotropic, voltage gated	Increase membrane permeability for calcium
metabotropic group I	G_{q}-coupled	Increase IP3 and diacyl glycerol by activating phospholipase C
metabotropic group II	G_{i}/G_{0}-coupled	Decrease intracellular levels of cAMP by inhibiting adenylate cyclase
metabotropic group III	G_{i}/G_{0}-coupled	Decrease intracellular levels of cAMP by inhibiting adenylate cyclase

Many synapses use multiple types of glutamate receptors. AMPA receptors are ionotropic receptors specialized for fast excitation: in many synapses they produce excitatory electrical responses in their targets a fraction of a millisecond after being stimulated. NMDA receptors are also ionotropic, but they differ from AMPA receptors in being permeable, when activated, to calcium. Their properties make them particularly important for learning and memory. Metabotropic receptors act through second messenger systems to create slow, sustained effects on their targets.

=== Uptake and recycling ===
After synaptic release, glutamate is rapidly cleared from the extracellular space by excitatory amino acid transporters (EAATs) on astrocytes and neurons. Astrocytes account for most of this uptake, which helps terminate glutamate signaling.

In astrocytes, glutamine synthetase converts glutamate to glutamine. The astrocytes release glutamine, which neurons take up and convert back to glutamate via glutaminase. This process, known as the glutamate–glutamine cycle, helps replenish the neuronal supply of glutamate for subsequent release.

== Comparative biology and evolution ==
Glutamate functions as a neurotransmitter in every type of animal that has a nervous system, including ctenophores (comb jellies), which branched off from other phyla at an early stage in evolution and lack the other neurotransmitters found ubiquitously among animals, including serotonin and acetylcholine. Rather, ctenophores have functionally distinct types of ionotropic glutamate receptors, such that activation of these receptors may trigger muscle contraction and other responses.

Sponges do not have a nervous system, but also make use of glutamate for cell-to-cell signalling. Sponges possess metabotropic glutamate receptors, and application of glutamate to a sponge can trigger a whole-body response that sponges use to rid themselves of contaminants. The genome of Trichoplax, a primitive organism that also lacks a nervous system, contains numerous metabotropic glutamate receptors, but their function is not yet known.

Glutamate is the primary excitatory neurotransmitter in the insect neuromuscular junction. Glutamate binds to postsynaptic iGluRs, opening ion channels and causing muscle depolarization, and initiating fast contraction. Specific iGluR subunits (e.g., GluRIIA, GluRIIB) and auxiliary proteins (Neto) are essential for assembling and anchoring these receptors at the synapse, ensuring proper signal transmission.

In arthropods and nematodes, glutamate stimulates glutamate-gated chloride channels. The β subunits of the receptor respond with very high affinity to glutamate and glycine. Targeting these receptors has been the therapeutic goal of anthelmintic therapy using avermectins. Avermectins target the alpha subunit of glutamate-gated chloride channels with high affinity. These receptors have also been described in arthropods, such as Drosophila melanogaster and Lepeophtheirus salmonis. Irreversible activation of these receptors with avermectins results in hyperpolarization at synapses and neuromuscular junctions resulting in flaccid paralysis and death of nematodes and arthropods.

== Excitotoxicity and disease ==
Excitotoxicity is neuronal injury caused by excessive activation of excitatory neurotransmitter receptors. Excessive activation of NMDA receptors can lead to an influx of calcium that overwhelms the cell's ability to regulate intracellular calcium. The resulting calcium overload can impair mitochondrial function and increase oxidative stress, contributing to neuronal cell death.

During an ischemic stroke, increased glutamate release and impaired uptake can raise extracellular glutamate concentrations. The resulting overstimulation of glutamate receptors contributes to neuronal injury in the ischemic cascade. Glutamate-mediated excitotoxicity has also been proposed to contribute to neuronal cell loss in amyotrophic lateral sclerosis, neurolathyrism, and Alzheimer's disease.

Glutamatergic signaling also contributes to seizure activity. Fast excitatory transmission triggered by AMPA receptors helps sustain and propagate the synchronized neuronal activity that results in epileptic seizures.

== Glutamate derivatives in excitotoxicity therapy ==
Because of glutamate's role in excitotoxicity, the synthesis and modification of glutamate derivatives have been studied as potential therapies for associated neurodegenerative diseases. These derivatives primarily act as receptor antagonists, preventing the binding of glutamate and subsequent cascade leading to cell death.

One example of a glutamate derivative antagonist is 2-amino-7-phosphonoheptanoic acid (AP-7). AP-7 showed effective neuroprotection in rat brains, specifically a lower percentage of hemisphere infarcted compared to control groups. However, this kind of treatment has not advanced to human clinical trials.

An alternative approach, is open channel blocking, through which compounds like memantine block channels preferentially during glutamate surges, preventing complete shutdown of healthy pathways, while still decreasing cell death.

== History ==
The presence of glutamate in every part of the body as a building-block for protein made its special role in the nervous system difficult to recognize: its function as a neurotransmitter was not generally accepted until the 1970s, decades after the identification of acetylcholine, norepinephrine, and serotonin as neurotransmitters. The first suggestion that glutamate might function as a transmitter came from T. Hayashi in 1952, who was motivated by the finding that injections of glutamate into the cerebral ventricles of dogs could cause them to have seizures. Other support for this idea soon appeared, but the majority of physiologists were skeptical, for a variety of theoretical and empirical reasons. One of the most common reasons for skepticism was the universality of glutamate's excitatory effects in the central nervous system, which seemed inconsistent with the specificity expected of a neurotransmitter. Other reasons for skepticism included a lack of known antagonists and the absence of a known mechanism for inactivation. A series of discoveries during the 1970s resolved most of these doubts, and by 1980 the compelling nature of the evidence was almost universally recognized.
