= NBQX =

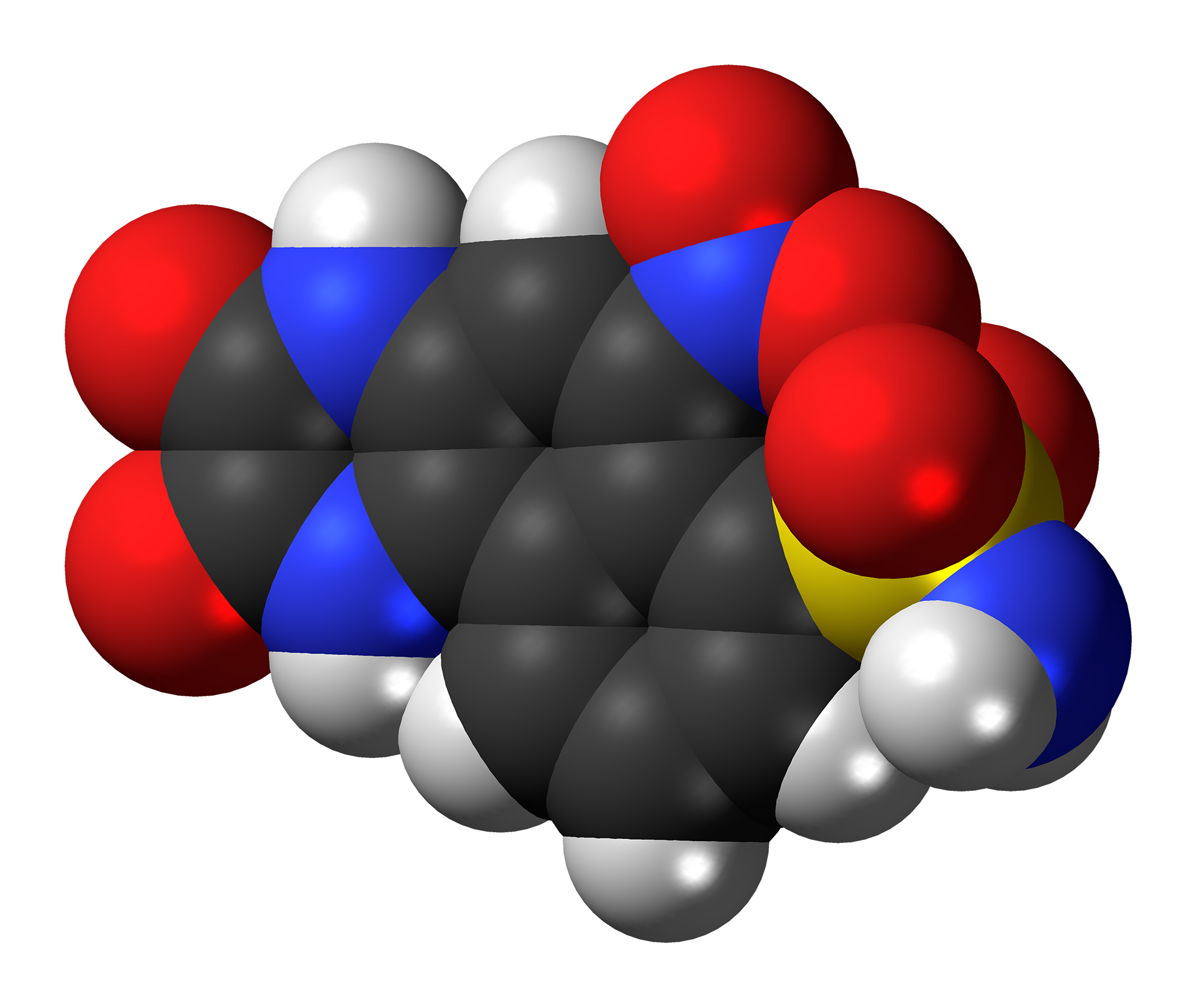

Names
- Preferred IUPAC name 6-Nitro-2,3-dioxo-1,2,3,4-tetrahydrobenzo[f]quinoxaline-7-sulfonamide

Identifiers
CAS Number	118876-58-7
3D model (JSmol)	Interactive image
ChEMBL	ChEMBL222519
ChemSpider	2521927
ECHA InfoCard	100.149.984
IUPHAR/BPS	4264
KEGG	C13667
PubChem CID	3272524
UNII	8LZ6Q43V2S
CompTox Dashboard (EPA)	DTXSID60152256
- InChI: InChI=1S/C12H8N4O6S/c13-23(21,22)8-3-1-2-5-9(8)7(16(19)20)4-6-10(5)15-12(18)11(17)14-6/h1-4H,(H,14,17)(H,15,18)(H2,13,21,22) Key: UQNAFPHGVPVTAL-UHFFFAOYSA-N; InChI=1/C12H8N4O6S/c13-23(21,22)8-3-1-2-5-9(8)7(16(19)20)4-6-10(5)15-12(18)11(17)14-6/h1-4H,(H,14,17)(H,15,18)(H2,13,21,22) Key: UQNAFPHGVPVTAL-UHFFFAOYAI
- SMILES: [O-][N+](=O)c2cc3c(c1cccc(c12)S(=O)(=O)N)NC(=O)C(=O)N3

Properties
Chemical formula	C_{12}H_{8}N_{4}O_{6}S
Molar mass	336.281
Appearance	brown/red powder
Solubility in water	Soluble to 100 mM in DMSO
- Except where otherwise noted, data are given for materials in their standard state (at 25 °C [77 °F], 100 kPa). verify (what is ?) Infobox references

NBQX (2,3-dioxo-6-nitro-7-sulfamoyl-benzo[f]quinoxaline) is an antagonist of the AMPA receptor.

NBQX blocks AMPA receptors in micromolar concentrations (~10–20 μM) and also blocks kainate receptors. In experiments, it is used to counter glutamate excitotoxicity. NBQX was found to have anticonvulsant activity in rodent seizure models.

As the disodium salt, NBQX is soluble in water at high concentrations (at least up to 100 mM).

== See also ==
- CNQX
- DNQX
- Fanapanel (MPQX)
- Quinoxalinedione
