= GRID2 =

Protein-coding gene in the species Homo sapiens

Identifiers
- Aliases: GRID2, GluD2, SCAR18, glutamate ionotropic receptor delta type subunit 2
- External IDs: OMIM: 602368; MGI: 95813; GeneCards: GRID2
Available structures
PDB	Ortholog search: PDBe RCSB
PDB	List of PDB id codes 5KCA, 5KC8

Gene location (Human)
Chr.	Chromosome 4 (human)
Band	4q22.1-q22.2	Start	92,303,966 bp
Band	4q22.1-q22.2	End	93,810,157 bp

Gene location (Mouse)
Chr.	Chromosome 6 (mouse)
Band	6 C1|6 29.77 cM	Start	63,232,860 bp
Band	6 C1|6 29.77 cM	End	64,681,307 bp
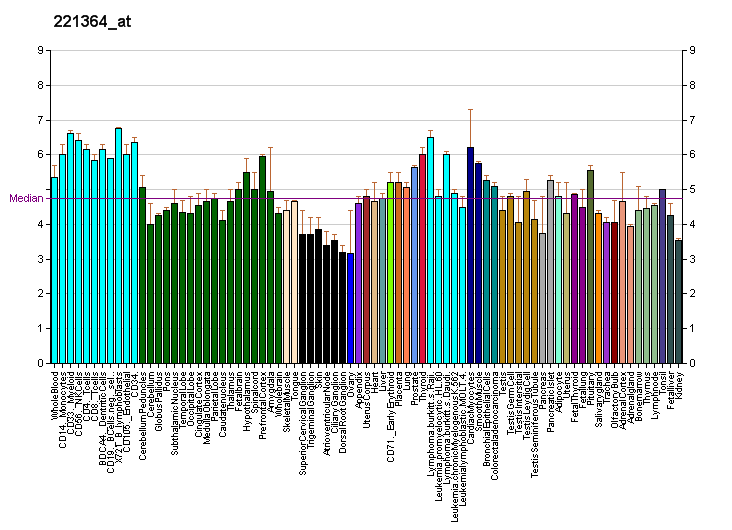
RNA expression pattern
Bgee	Human / Mouse (ortholog); Top expressed in: right testis; left testis; testicle; right hemisphere of cerebellum; gonad; ventricular zone; ganglionic eminence; corpus callosum; nucleus accumbens; prefrontal cortex / Top expressed in: lobe of cerebellum; cerebellar vermis; lumbar subsegment of spinal cord; motor neuron; vestibular membrane of cochlear duct; substantia nigra; facial motor nucleus; urethra; dorsomedial hypothalamic nucleus; deep cerebellar nuclei; More reference expression data
BioGPS	More reference expression data
Gene ontology
Molecular function	glutamate receptor activity; PDZ domain binding; scaffold protein binding; ion channel activity; ionotropic glutamate receptor activity; extracellularly glutamate-gated ion channel activity; protein binding; signaling receptor activity; transmitter-gated ion channel activity involved in regulation of postsynaptic membrane potential
Cellular component	integral component of membrane; postsynaptic membrane; membrane; plasma membrane; dendritic spine; synapse; integral component of plasma membrane; cell junction; ionotropic glutamate receptor complex; somatodendritic compartment; parallel fiber to Purkinje cell synapse; glutamatergic synapse; integral component of postsynaptic density membrane
Biological process	glutamate receptor signaling pathway; heterophilic cell-cell adhesion via plasma membrane cell adhesion molecules; regulation of neuron projection development; synaptic transmission, glutamatergic; regulation of neuron apoptotic process; ion transport; ion transmembrane transport; ionotropic glutamate receptor signaling pathway; excitatory postsynaptic potential; cerebellar granule cell differentiation; prepulse inhibition; positive regulation of synapse assembly; positive regulation of long-term synaptic depression; excitatory synapse assembly; regulation of postsynaptic density assembly; modulation of chemical synaptic transmission
Sources:Amigo / QuickGO
Orthologs
Databases	NCBI: entry; OMA: entry
Species	Human	Mouse
Entrez	2895	14804
Ensembl	ENSG00000152208	ENSMUSG00000071424
UniProt	O43424	Q61625
RefSeq (mRNA)	NM_001286838; NM_001510	NM_008167; NM_001370966
RefSeq (protein)	NP_001273767; NP_001501	NP_032193; NP_001357895
Location (UCSC)	Chr 4: 92.3 – 93.81 Mb	Chr 6: 63.23 – 64.68 Mb
PubMed search
- Wikidata
View/Edit Human	View/Edit Mouse

Glutamate receptor, ionotropic, delta 2, also known as GluD2, GluRδ2, or δ_{2}, is a protein that in humans is encoded by the GRID2 gene. This protein together with GluD1 belongs to the delta receptor subtype of ionotropic glutamate receptors. They possess 14–24% sequence homology with AMPA, kainate, and NMDA subunits, but, despite their name, have been found not to directly promote neuronal activation in response to glutamate or various other glutamate agonists.

delta iGluRs have long been considered orphan receptors as their endogenous ligand was unknown. They are now believed to bind glycine and D-serine but these do not result in channel opening.

== Function ==
GluD2-containing receptors are selectively/predominantly expressed in Purkinje cells in the cerebellum where they play a key role in synaptogenesis, synaptic plasticity, and motor coordination.

GluD2 induces synaptogenesis through interaction of its N-terminal domain with Cbln1, which in turn interacts with presynaptic neurexins, forming a bridge across cerebellar synapses.

The main functions of GluD2 in synaptic plasticity are carried out by its intracellular C-terminus. This is regulated by D-serine, which binds to the ligand-binding domain and results in changes in the structure of GluD2 without opening the channel in the absence of pre-synaptic connections. Glycine and D-serine can open the channel in GluD2 when bound to cerebellin-1 and neurexin-1β. These changes may signal up to the N-terminal domain or down to the C-terminal domain to alter protein-protein interactions.

== Pathology ==
A heterozygous deletion in GRID2 in humans causes a complicated spastic paraplegia with ataxia, frontotemporal dementia, and lower motor neuron involvement whereas a homozygous biallelic deletion leads to a syndrome of cerebellar ataxia with marked developmental delay, pyramidal tract involvement and tonic upgaze, that can be classified as an ataxia with oculomotor apraxia (AOA) and has been named spinocerebellar ataxia, autosomal recessive type 18 (SCAR18).

A gain of channel function, resulting from a point mutation in mouse GRID2, is associated with the phenotype named 'lurcher', which in the heterozygous state leads to ataxia and motor coordination deficits resulting from selective, cell-autonomous apoptosis of cerebellar Purkinje cells during postnatal development. Mice homozygous for this mutation die shortly after birth from massive loss of mid- and hindbrain neurons during late embryogenesis.

== Ligands ==
9-Aminoacridine, 9-tetrahydroaminoacridine, N1-dansyl-spermine, N1-dansyl-spermidine, and pentamidine have been shown to act as antagonists of δ_{2}-containing receptors.

== Interactions ==
GRID2 has been shown to interact with GOPC, GRIK2, PTPN4 and GRIA1. A possible correlation between GRID2 and the pre-B lymphocyte protein 3 (VPREB3) has been suggested, due to the apparent importance of B-lymphocytes in the origins of cerebellar Purkinje neurons in humans. Morphological studies conducted in GRID2-knockout mice suggest that GRID2 may be present in lymphocytes as well as in the adrenal cortex, however further studies must be conducted to confirm these claims.

== See also ==
- GRID1
