= Quinoxalinedione =

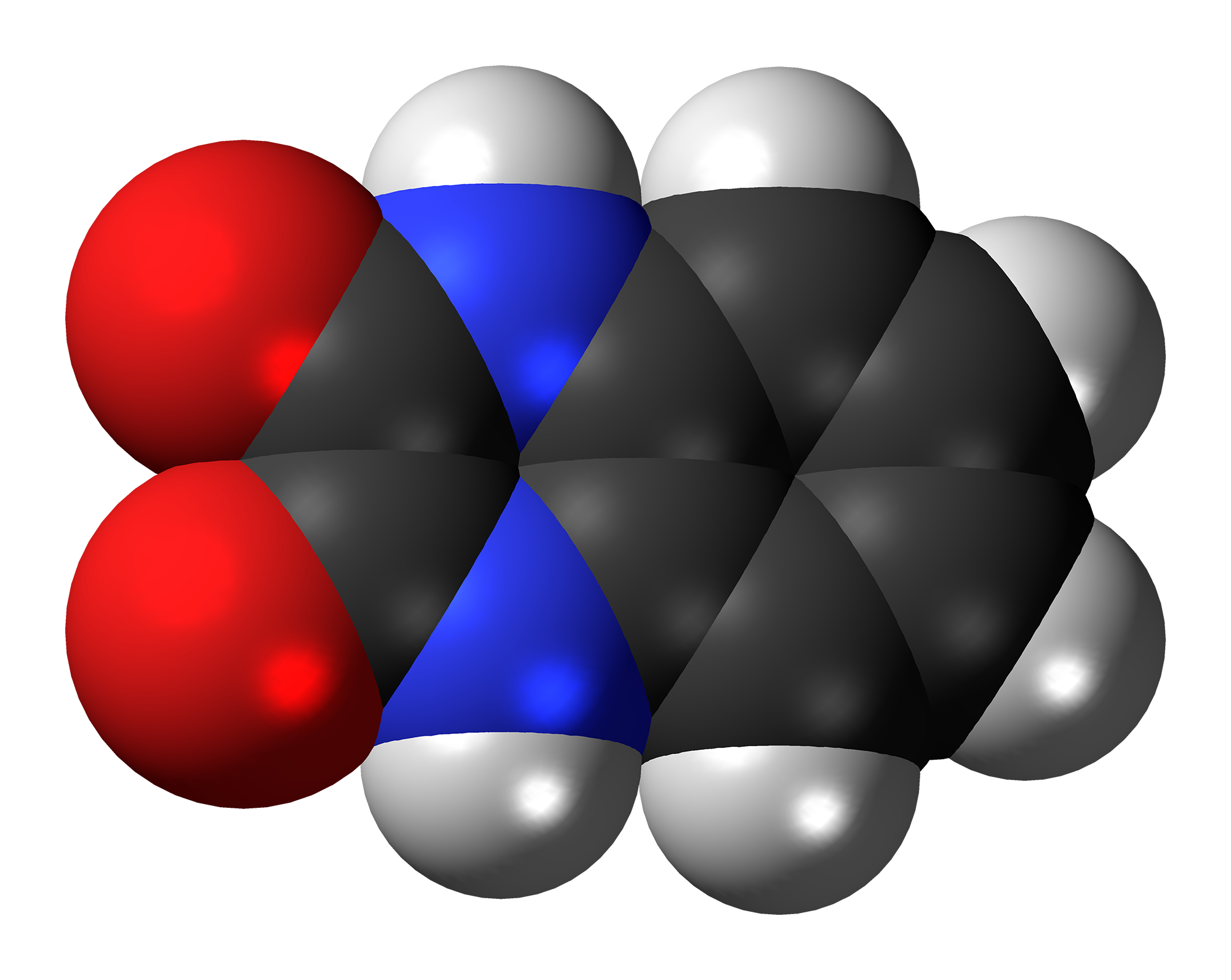

Names
- Preferred IUPAC name 1,4-Dihydroquinoxaline-2,3-dione

Identifiers
CAS Number	15804-19-0
3D model (JSmol)	Interactive image
ChemSpider	9644059
ECHA InfoCard	100.036.259
EC Number	239-901-0
PubChem CID	11469229
UNII	APO55IZ9E1
CompTox Dashboard (EPA)	DTXSID9065946
- InChI: InChI=1S/C8H4N2O2/c11-7-8(12)10-6-4-2-1-3-5(6)9-7/h1-4H Key: SEPKUNXLGWMPHL-UHFFFAOYSA-N
- SMILES: C1=CC2=NC(=O)C(=O)N=C2C=C1

Properties
Chemical formula	C_{8}H_{6}N_{2}O_{2}
Molar mass	162.15
Appearance	white solid
Density	1.549 g/cm^{3}
Melting point	> 300 °C (572 °F; 573 K)

Hazards
- GHS labelling
Pictograms	(GHS05: Corrosive) (GHS07: Exclamation mark)
Signal word	Warning
Hazard statements	H302, H315, H318, H319, H335
- Except where otherwise noted, data are given for materials in their standard state (at 25 °C [77 °F], 100 kPa). Infobox references

Quinoxalinedione is an organic compound with the formula C_{6}H_{4}(NH)_{2}(CO)_{2}. It is a colorless solid that is soluble in polar organic solvents. Quinoxalinediones are a family of related compounds sharing the same bicyclic core. Various quinoxalinediones are drugs.

== Synthesis and structure ==
Quinoxalinedione is produced by condensation of dimethyloxalate and o-phenylenediamine:

C_{2}O_{2}(OMe)_{2} + C_{6}H_{4}(NH_{2})_{2} → C_{6}H_{4}(NH)_{2}(CO)_{2} + 2 MeOH

The compound exists in solution and the solid state predominantly as the diamide form. Some reactions of the compound indicate a role for the diol tautomer.

== Drugs based on quinoxalinediones ==
Quinoxalinediones act as antagonists of the AMPA, kainate, and/or NMDA receptors of the ionotropic glutamate receptor family. Examples include the following:

- ACEA-1011
- Becampanel
- CNQX
- DNQX
- Fanapanel (MPQX)
- Licostinel (ACEA-1021)
- NBQX
- PNQX
- YM90K
- Zonampanel

A drug closely related to the quinoxalinediones, but possessing a quinazoline-2,4-dione structure instead, is selurampanel. Caroverine is another closely related drug to the above, but instead containing a quinoxaline-2-one structure.
