= DHK =

DHK may refer to:

== Places ==
- Dhaka, Bangladesh
- Datteln-Hamm Canal, Germany (German: Datteln-Hamm-Kanal)
- Dhakuria railway station, Kolkata, India (station code:DHK)
- Duhok International Airport, Iraq (IATA: DHK)

== Businesses and organizations ==
- Croatian Writers' Association (Croatian: Društvo hrvatskih književnika)
- DHL Air UK (ICAO:DHK)
- Diocese of Hong Kong Island, of the Anglican Church
- German Chamber of Commerce of Austria (German: Deutsche Handelskammer in Österreich)
- Department of Human Kinetics, University of the Philippines Los Baños College of Arts and Sciences

== Chemicals ==
- Dihydrokainic acid, an inhibitor of the GLT-1 glutamate transporter
- Dihydrokaempferol, a flavanoid in the Siberian pine

== Sports teams ==
- DHK Latgale, a Latvian ice hockey team
- Drammen HK, a Norwegian handball club
