= C6H11NO4 =

The molecular formula C_{6}H_{11}NO_{4} may refer to:

- α-Aminoadipic acid
- N-Methyl-L-glutamic acid
- SYM-2081 (4-methyl-L-glutamic acid)
