= DNQX =

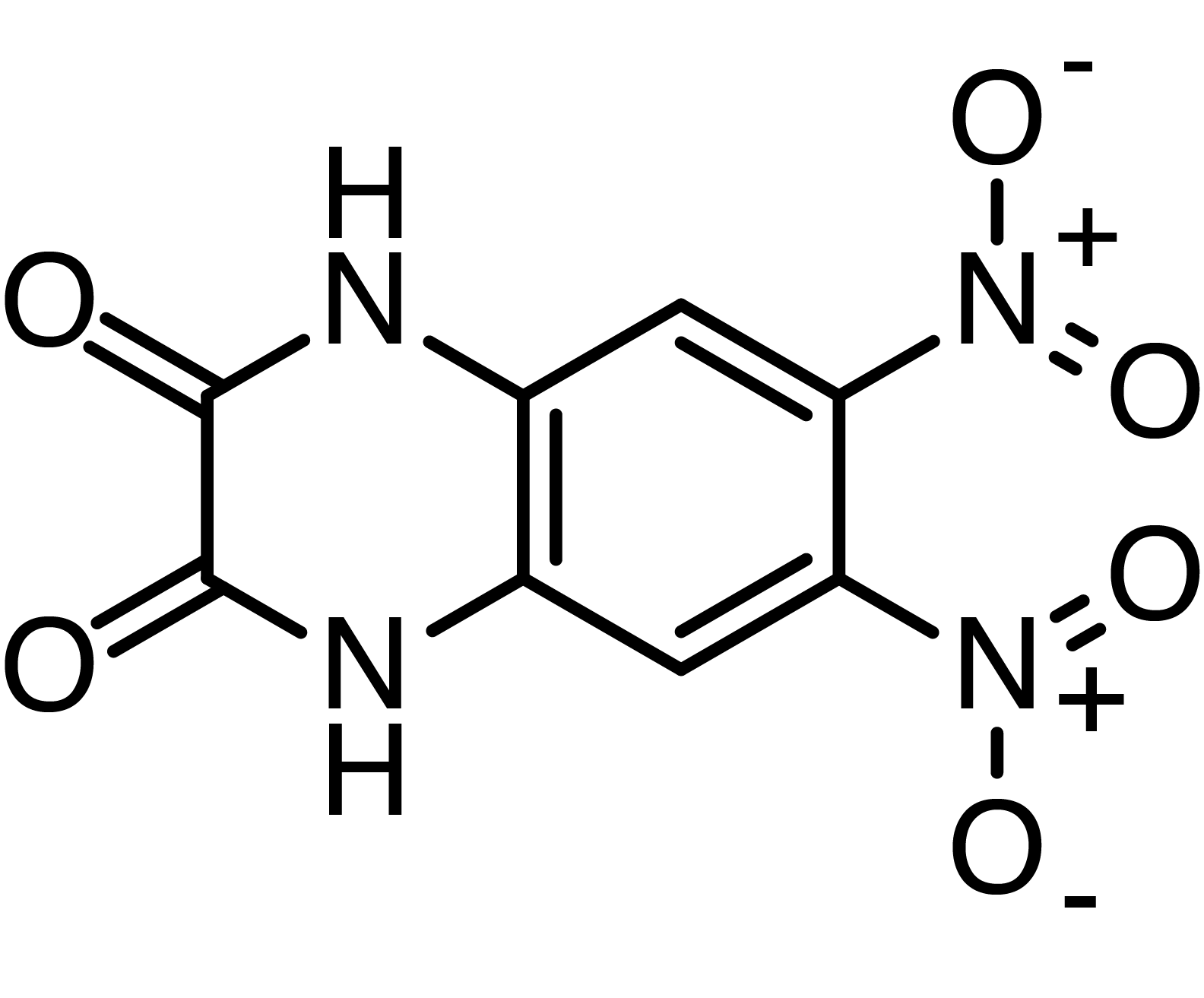

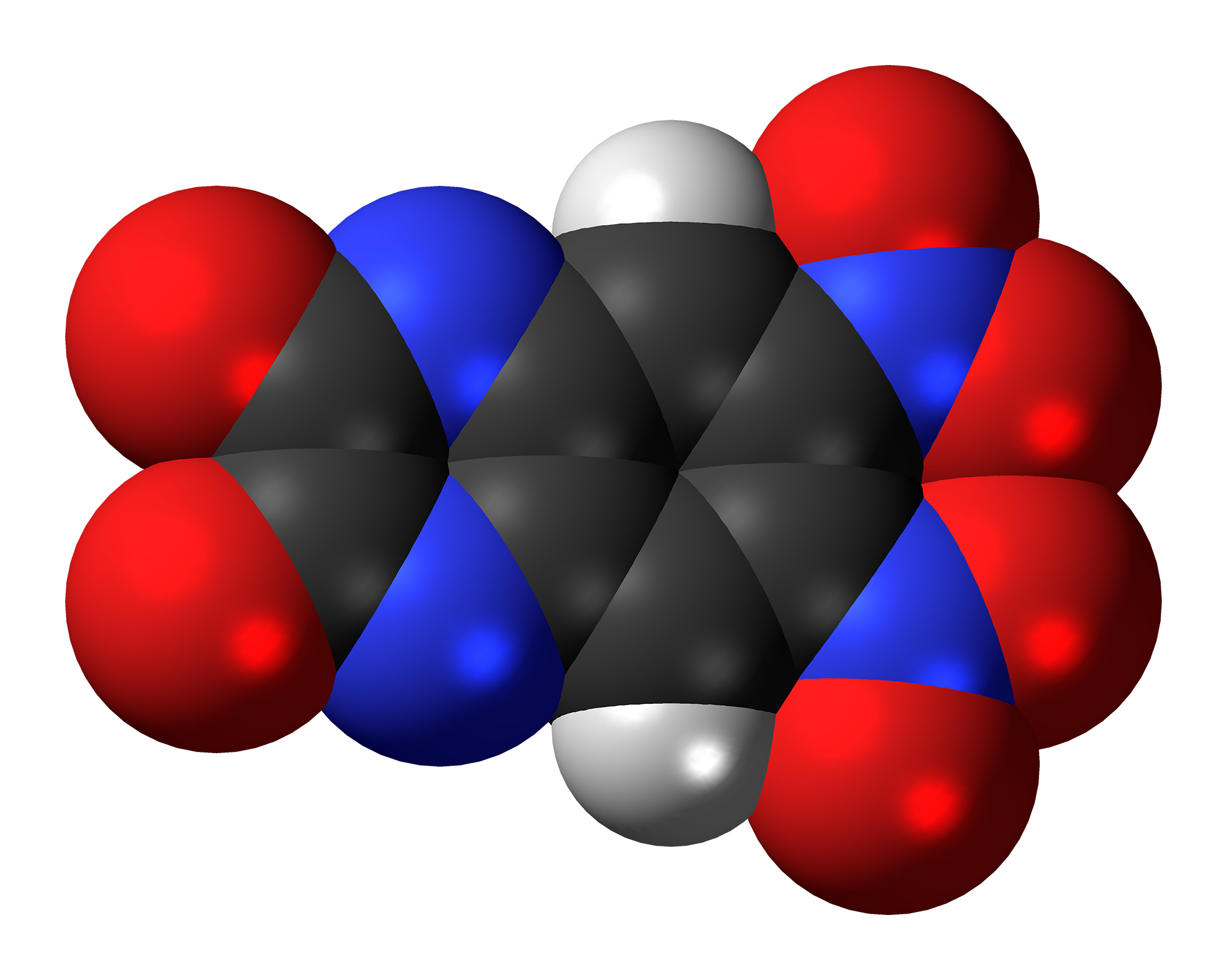

Names
- Preferred IUPAC name 6,7-Dinitro-1,4-dihydroquinoxaline-2,3-dione

Identifiers
CAS Number	2379-57-9
3D model (JSmol)	Interactive image
ChemSpider	3123097
DrugBank	DB03759
PubChem CID	3899541
UNII	62T278S1MX
CompTox Dashboard (EPA)	DTXSID50274395
- InChI: InChI=1S/C8H4N4O6/c13-7-8(14)10-4-2-6(12(17)18)5(11(15)16)1-3(4)9-7/h1-2H,(H,9,13)(H,10,14) Key: RWVIMCIPOAXUDG-UHFFFAOYSA-N; InChI=1S/C8H4N4O6/c13-7-8(14)10-4-2-6(12(17)18)5(11(15)16)1-3(4)9-7/h1-2H,(H,9,13)(H,10,14) Key: RWVIMCIPOAXUDG-UHFFFAOYSA-N
- SMILES: O=c2[nH]c1cc(N(=O)=O)c(N(=O)=O)cc1[nH]c2=O

Properties
Chemical formula	C_{8}H_{4}N_{4}O_{6}
Molar mass	252.142 g·mol^{−1}
- Except where otherwise noted, data are given for materials in their standard state (at 25 °C [77 °F], 100 kPa). verify (what is ?) Infobox references

DNQX or dinquixaline (6,7-dinitroquinoxaline-2,3-dione) is a competitive antagonist at AMPA and kainate receptors, two ionotropic glutamate receptor (iGluR) subfamilies. It is used in a variety of molecular biology subfields, notably neurophysiology, to assist researchers in determining the properties of various types of ion channels and their potential applications in medicine.

DNQX (an AMPA receptor antagonist) displays significant effects on neurons. When applied to rat hippocampus neurons in culture, it produces a dose-dependent neurotoxicity which intriguingly seems to operate through a mechanism independent of ionotropic glutamate receptors. This effect is specific to neurons and does not impact the surrounding glial cells.

In the context of amphetamine-induced behavioral sensitization in mice, DNQX demonstrates the capacity to block both the onset and the manifestation of this sensitization. Rather than impacting the overall amphetamine activity, DNQX specifically intervenes in the sensitization process. This phenomenon might be attributed to the activation of excitatory amino acid receptors which subsequently provoke an increased dopamine release in the striatum. Therefore, DNQX's actions appear to be both potent and specific hinting at complex mechanisms beyond traditional ionotropic glutamate receptor pathways.

An activation of both AMPA/kainate and dopaminergic receptors in the nucleus accumbens may be crucial for the reward response triggered by psychostimulant drugs. Dopaminergic antagonists often do not prevent the acquisition of a conditioned place preference for cocaine, a common measure of drug reward. In experiments where DNQX, an AMPA receptor antagonist, was injected into the nucleus accumbens prior to systemic cocaine administration, it diminished the acquisition of this place preference, highlighting AMPA receptors' role in this process. Conversely, the dopaminergic antagonist fluphenazine did not alter cocaine-induced place preference, possibly due to adaptations following repeated drug exposure. Both DNQX and fluphenazine blocked the expression of conditioned place preference in rats previously trained with cocaine alone, indicating the involvement of both AMPA and dopaminergic receptors in the expression of cocaine-induced place preference.

== See also ==
- Quinoxalinedione
- CNQX
- AMPA
