= BAY 36-7620 =

Names
- IUPAC name (3aS,6aS)-5-methylidene-3a-(naphthalen-2-ylmethyl)-1,4,6,6a-tetrahydrocyclopenta[c]furan-3-one

Identifiers
CAS Number	232605-26-4
3D model (JSmol)	Interactive image
ChEMBL	ChEMBL254372
ChemSpider	8079411
IUPHAR/BPS	1381
PubChem CID	9903757
UNII	0P934RSF8B
- InChI: InChI=1S/C19H18O2/c1-13-8-17-12-21-18(20)19(17,10-13)11-14-6-7-15-4-2-3-5-16(15)9-14/h2-7,9,17H,1,8,10-12H2/t17-,19+/m1/s1 Key: CVIRWLJKDBYYOG-MJGOQNOKSA-N
- SMILES: C=C1C[C@@H]2COC(=O)[C@@]2(C1)CC3=CC4=CC=CC=C4C=C3

Properties
Chemical formula	C_{19}H_{18}O_{2}
Molar mass	278.351 g·mol^{−1}
- Except where otherwise noted, data are given for materials in their standard state (at 25 °C [77 °F], 100 kPa). Infobox references

BAY 36-7620 is an antagonist at mGluR1 receptors. It has a IC50 value of 160 nM at the receptor. This compound has been used to study metabotropic glutamate receptors, along with other chemicals.

== Effects ==
When used on rats in vivo, BAY 36-7620 has anticonvulsant and neuroprotective effects, while lacking side effects present with ionotropic glutamate receptor antagonists.
