= UBP-302 =

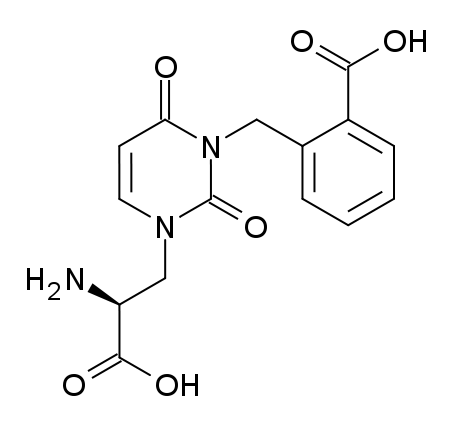

Names
- Systematic IUPAC name 2-({3-[(2S)-2-Amino-2-carboxyethyl]-2,6-dioxo-3,6-dihydropyrimidin-1(2H)-yl}methyl)benzoic acid

Identifiers
CAS Number	745055-91-8
3D model (JSmol)	Interactive image
ChEMBL	ChEMBL372797
ChemSpider	4925720
ECHA InfoCard	100.210.061
PubChem CID	6420161
UNII	FZ8AP4UA5Y
CompTox Dashboard (EPA)	DTXSID80423571
- InChI: InChI=1S/C15H15N3O6/c16-11(14(22)23)8-17-6-5-12(19)18(15(17)24)7-9-3-1-2-4-10(9)13(20)21/h1-6,11H,7-8,16H2,(H,20,21)(H,22,23)/t11-/m0/s1 Key: UUIYULWYHDSXHL-NSHDSACASA-N; InChI=1/C15H15N3O6/c16-11(14(22)23)8-17-6-5-12(19)18(15(17)24)7-9-3-1-2-4-10(9)13(20)21/h1-6,11H,7-8,16H2,(H,20,21)(H,22,23)/t11-/m0/s1 Key: UUIYULWYHDSXHL-NSHDSACABL
- SMILES: c1ccc(c(c1)Cn2c(=O)ccn(c2=O)C[C@@H](C(=O)O)N)C(=O)O

Properties
Chemical formula	C_{15}H_{15}N_{3}O_{6}
Molar mass	333.296 g/mol
- Except where otherwise noted, data are given for materials in their standard state (at 25 °C [77 °F], 100 kPa). verify (what is ?) Infobox references

UBP-302 is a highly selective kainate receptor antagonist used in the study of many neurological processes. It is active at micromolar concentration within an in vitro preparation and specifically targets the GluK1 (iGluR5) subunit of the receptor. This compound was developed at the University of Bristol.

UBP-310 and UBP-316 (ACET) are related N3-substituted willardiine derivatives.
