= Glutamate–glutamine cycle =

Biochemical pathway that maintains glutamate supply in CNS

In biochemistry, the glutamate–glutamine cycle is a cyclic metabolic pathway which maintains an adequate supply of the neurotransmitter glutamate in the central nervous system. Neurons are unable to synthesize either the excitatory neurotransmitter glutamate, or the inhibitory GABA from glucose. Discoveries of glutamate and glutamine pools within intercellular compartments led to suggestions of the glutamate–glutamine cycle working between neurons and astrocytes. The glutamate/GABA–glutamine cycle is a metabolic pathway that describes the release of either glutamate or GABA from neurons which is then taken up into astrocytes (non-neuronal glial cells). In return, astrocytes release glutamine to be taken up into neurons for use as a precursor to the synthesis of either glutamate or GABA.

== Production ==
=== Glutamate ===
Initially, in a glutamatergic synapse, the neurotransmitter glutamate is released from the neurons and is taken up into the synaptic cleft. Glutamate residing in the synapse must be rapidly removed in one of three ways:

1. Uptake into the postsynaptic compartment,
2. Re-uptake into the presynaptic compartment, or
3. Uptake into a third, nonneuronal compartment.

Postsynaptic neurons remove little glutamate from the synapse. There is active reuptake into presynaptic neurons, but this mechanism appears to be less important than astrocytic transport. Astrocytes could dispose of transported glutamate in two ways. They could export it to blood capillaries, which abut the astrocyte foot processes. However, this strategy would result in a net loss of carbon and nitrogen from the system. An alternate approach would be to convert glutamate into another compound, preferably a non-neuroactive species. The advantage of this approach is that neuronal glutamate could be restored without the risk of trafficking the transmitter through extracellular fluid, where glutamate would cause neuronal depolarization. Astrocytes readily convert glutamate to glutamine via the glutamine synthetase pathway and released into the extracellular space. The glutamine is taken into the presynaptic terminals and metabolized into glutamate by the phosphate-activated glutaminase (a mitochondrial enzyme). The glutamate that is synthesized in the presynaptic terminal is packaged into synaptic vesicles by the glutamate transporter, VGLUT. Once the vesicle is released, glutamate is removed from the synaptic cleft by excitatory amino-acid transporters (EAATs). This allows synaptic terminals and glial cells to work together to maintain a proper supply of glutamate, which can also be produced by transamination of 2-oxoglutarate, an intermediate in the citric acid cycle. Recent electrophysiological evidence suggests that active synapses require presynaptically localized glutamine glutamate cycle to maintain excitatory neurotransmission in specific circumstances. In other systems, it has been suggested that neurons have alternate mechanisms to cope with compromised glutamate–glutamine cycling.

=== GABA ===
At GABAergic synapses, the cycle is called the GABA-glutamine cycle. Here the glutamine taken up by neurons is converted to glutamate, which is then metabolized into GABA by glutamate decarboxylase (GAD). Upon release, GABA is taken up into astrocytes via GABA transporters and then catabolized into succinate by the joint actions of GABA transaminase and succinate-semialdehyde dehydrogenase. Glutamine is synthesized from succinate via the TCA cycle, which includes a condensation reaction of oxaloacetate and acetyl-CoA-forming citrate. Then the synthesis of α-ketoglutarate and glutamate occurs, after which glutamate is again metabolized into GABA by GAD. The supply of glutamine to GABAergic neurons is less significant, because these neurons exhibit a larger proportion of reuptake of the released neurotransmitter compared to their glutamatergic counterparts

== Ammonia homeostasis ==
One of the problems of both the glutamate–glutamine cycle and the GABA-glutamine cycle is ammonia homeostasis. When one molecule of glutamate or GABA is converted to glutamine in the astrocytes, one molecule of ammonia is absorbed. Also, for each molecule of glutamate or GABA cycled into the astrocytes from the synapse, one molecule of ammonia will be produced in the neurons. This ammonia will obviously have to be transported out of the neurons and back into the astrocytes for detoxification, as an elevated ammonia concentration has detrimental effects on a number of cellular functions and can cause a spectrum of neuropsychiatric and neurological symptoms (impaired memory, shortened attention span, sleep-wake inversions, brain edema, intracranial hypertension, seizures, ataxia and coma).

=== Transportation and detoxification ===
This could happen in two different ways: ammonia itself might simply diffuse (as NH3) or be transported (as NH4+) across the cell membranes in and out of the extracellular space, or a shuttle system involving carrier molecules (amino acids) might be employed. Certainly, ammonia can diffuse across lipid membranes, and it has been shown that ammonia can be transported by K+/Cl− co-transporters.

=== Amino-acid shuttles and the transport of ammonia ===
Since diffusion and transport of free ammonia across the cell membrane will affect the pH level of the cell, the more attractive and regulated way of transporting ammonia between the neuronal and the astrocytic compartment is via an amino-acid shuttle, of which there are two: leucine and alanine. The amino acid moves in the opposite direction of glutamine. In the opposite direction of the amino acid, a corresponding molecule is transported; for alanine this molecule is lactate; for leucine, α-ketoisocaproate.

==== Leucine ====
The ammonia fixed as part of the glutamate dehydrogenase enzyme reaction in the neurons is transaminated into α-ketoisocaproate to form the branched-chain amino acid leucine, which is exported to the astrocytes, where the process is reversed. α-ketoisocaproate is transported in the other direction.

==== Alanine ====
The ammonia produced in neurons is fixed into α-ketoglutarate by the glutamate-dehydrogenase reaction to form glutamate, then transaminated by alanine aminotransferase into lactate-derived pyruvate to form alanine, which is exported to astrocytes. In the astrocytes, this process is then reversed, and lactate is transported in the other direction.

== Disorders and conditions ==
Numerous reports have been published indicating that the glutamate/GABA–glutamine cycle is compromised in a variety of neurological disorders and conditions. Biopsies of sclerotic hippocampus tissue from human subjects with epilepsy have shown decreased glutamate–glutamine cycling. Another pathology in which the glutamate/GABA–glutamine cycle might be compromised is Alzheimer's disease; NMR spectroscopy showed decreased glutamate neurotransmission activity and TCA cycling rate in patients with Alzheimer's disease. Hyperammonemia in the brain, typically occurring as a secondary complication of primary liver disease and known as hepatic encephalopathy, is a condition that affects glutamate/GABA–glutamine cycling in the brain. Current research into autism also indicates potential roles for glutamate, glutamine, and/or GABA in autistic spectrum disorders.

== Potential drug targets ==
In the treatment of epilepsy, drugs such as vigabatrin that target both GABA transporters and the GABA metabolizing enzyme GABA-transaminase have been marketed, providing proof of principle for the neurotransmitter cycling systems as pharmacological targets. However, with regard to glutamate transport and metabolism, no such drugs have been developed, because glutamatergic synapses are abundant, and the neurotransmitter glutamate is an important metabolite in metabolism, making interference capable of adverse effects. So far, most of the drug development directed at the glutamatergic system seems to have been focused on ionotropic glutamate receptors as pharmacological targets, although G-protein coupled receptors have been attracting increased attention over the years.
