= Zonampanel =

Chemical compound

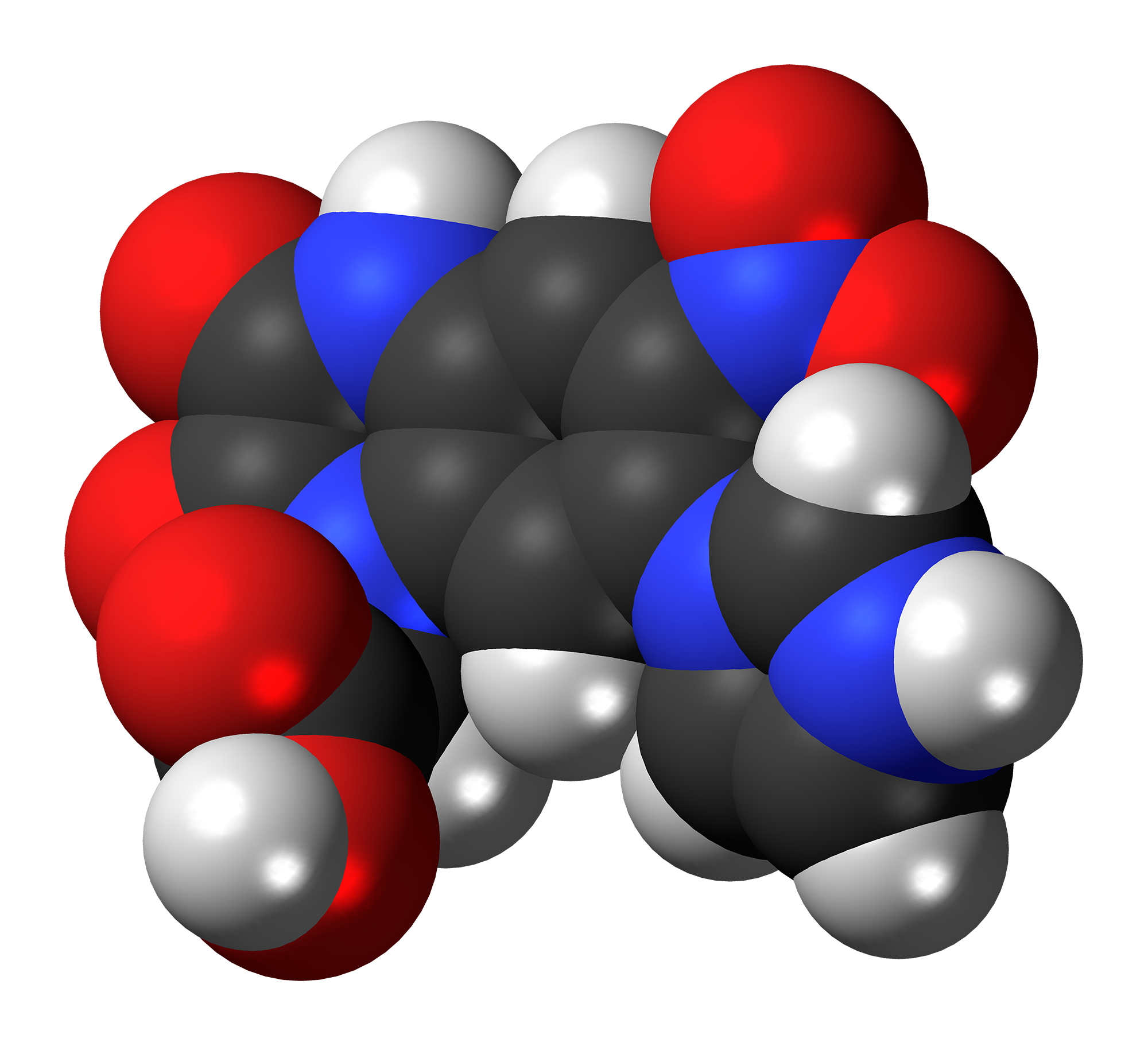

Clinical data
- ATC code: None

Identifiers
- IUPAC name: [7-(1H-Imidazol-1-yl)-6-nitro-2,3-dioxo-3,4-dihydro-1(2H)-quinoxalinyl]acetic acid
- CAS Number: 210245-80-0
- PubChem CID: 148200
- ChemSpider: 130649
- UNII: 9X33544ILS
- CompTox Dashboard (EPA): DTXSID50175232

Chemical and physical data
- Formula: C_{13}H_{9}N_{5}O_{6}
- Molar mass: 331.244 g·mol^{−1}
- 3D model (JSmol): Interactive image
- SMILES: c1cn(cn1)c2cc3c(cc2[N+](=O)[O-])[nH]c(=O)c(=O)n3CC(=O)O
- InChI: InChI=1S/C13H9N5O6/c19-11(20)5-17-8-4-9(16-2-1-14-6-16)10(18(23)24)3-7(8)15-12(21)13(17)22/h1-4,6H,5H2,(H,15,21)(H,19,20); Key:SPXYHZRWPRQLNS-UHFFFAOYSA-N

Zonampanel (INN, code name YM872) is a quinoxalinedione derivative drug and competitive antagonist of the AMPA receptor which was being investigated by Yamanouchi/Astellas Pharma as a neuroprotective drug for the treatment of ischemic stroke but never completed clinical trials. In clinical trials, zonampanel produced severe side effects including hallucinations, agitation, and catatonia in patients, resulting in early termination of the trials.
