= Becampanel =

Chemical compound

Clinical data
- ATC code: None

Identifiers
- IUPAC name: ({[(2,3-Dihydroxy-7-nitro-5-quinoxalinyl)methyl]amino}methyl)phosphonic acid
- CAS Number: 188696-80-2
- PubChem CID: 5491960
- ChemSpider: 4590791
- UNII: X3D0O800AJ
- CompTox Dashboard (EPA): DTXSID50172241

Chemical and physical data
- Formula: C_{10}H_{11}N_{4}O_{7}P
- Molar mass: 330.193 g·mol^{−1}
- 3D model (JSmol): Interactive image
- SMILES: c1c(cc2c(c1CNCP(=O)(O)O)[nH]c(=O)c(=O)[nH]2)[N+](=O)[O-]
- InChI: InChI=1S/C10H11N4O7P/c15-9-10(16)13-8-5(3-11-4-22(19,20)21)1-6(14(17)18)2-7(8)12-9/h1-2,11H,3-4H2,(H,12,15)(H,13,16)(H2,19,20,21); Key:ABFMMCZFKUIJGQ-UHFFFAOYSA-N

Becampanel (INN; development code AMP397) is a quinoxalinedione derivative drug which acts as a competitive antagonist of the AMPA receptor (IC_{50} = 11 nM). It was investigated as an anticonvulsant for the treatment of epilepsy by Novartis, and was also looked at as a potential treatment for neuropathic pain and cerebral ischemia, but never completed clinical trials.
