= AP5 =

Names
- Preferred IUPAC name (2R)-2-Amino-5-phosphonopentanoic acid

Identifiers
CAS Number	76326-31-3
3D model (JSmol)	Interactive image
ChemSpider	119225
ECHA InfoCard	100.150.904
PubChem CID	135342
UNII	39PJ29YY8Z
CompTox Dashboard (EPA)	DTXSID201000239
- InChI: InChI=1S/C5H12NO5P/c6-4(5(7)8)2-1-3-12(9,10)11/h4H,1-3,6H2,(H,7,8)(H2,9,10,11)/t4-/m1/s1 Key: VOROEQBFPPIACJ-SCSAIBSYSA-N; InChI=1/C5H12NO5P/c6-4(5(7)8)2-1-3-12(9,10)11/h4H,1-3,6H2,(H,7,8)(H2,9,10,11)/t4-/m1/s1 Key: VOROEQBFPPIACJ-SCSAIBSYBE
- SMILES: O=P(O)(O)CCC[C@@H](N)C(=O)O

Properties
Chemical formula	C_{5}H_{12}NO_{5}P
Molar mass	197.13 g/mol
Appearance	white solid
Density	1.529 g/mL
Boiling point	482.1 °C (899.8 °F; 755.2 K)
Solubility in water	Ammonium hydroxide, 50 mg/mL
- Except where otherwise noted, data are given for materials in their standard state (at 25 °C [77 °F], 100 kPa). verify (what is ?) Infobox references

AP5 (also known as APV, (2R)-amino-5-phosphonovaleric acid, or (2R)-amino-5-phosphonopentanoate) is a chemical compound used as a biochemical tool to study various cellular processes. It is a selective NMDA receptor antagonist that competitively inhibits the ligand (glutamate) binding site of NMDA receptors. AP5 blocks NMDA receptors in micromolar concentrations (~50 μM).

AP5 blocks the cellular analog of classical conditioning in the sea slug Aplysia californica, and has similar effects on Aplysia long-term potentiation (LTP), since NMDA receptors are required for both. It is sometimes used in conjunction with the calcium chelator BAPTA to determine whether NMDARs are required for a particular cellular process. AP5/APV has also been used to study NMDAR-dependent LTP in the mammalian hippocampus.

In general, AP5 is very fast-acting within in vitro preparations, and can block NMDA receptor action at a reasonably small concentration. The active isomer of AP5 is considered to be the D configuration, although many preparations are available as a racemic mixture of D- and L-isomers. It is useful to isolate the action of other glutamate receptors in the brain, i.e., AMPA and kainate receptors.

AP5 can block the conversion of a silent synapse to an active one, since this conversion is NMDA receptor-dependent.

== See also ==
- AMPA
- AP7 (drug)
- Kainate
