= NS102 =

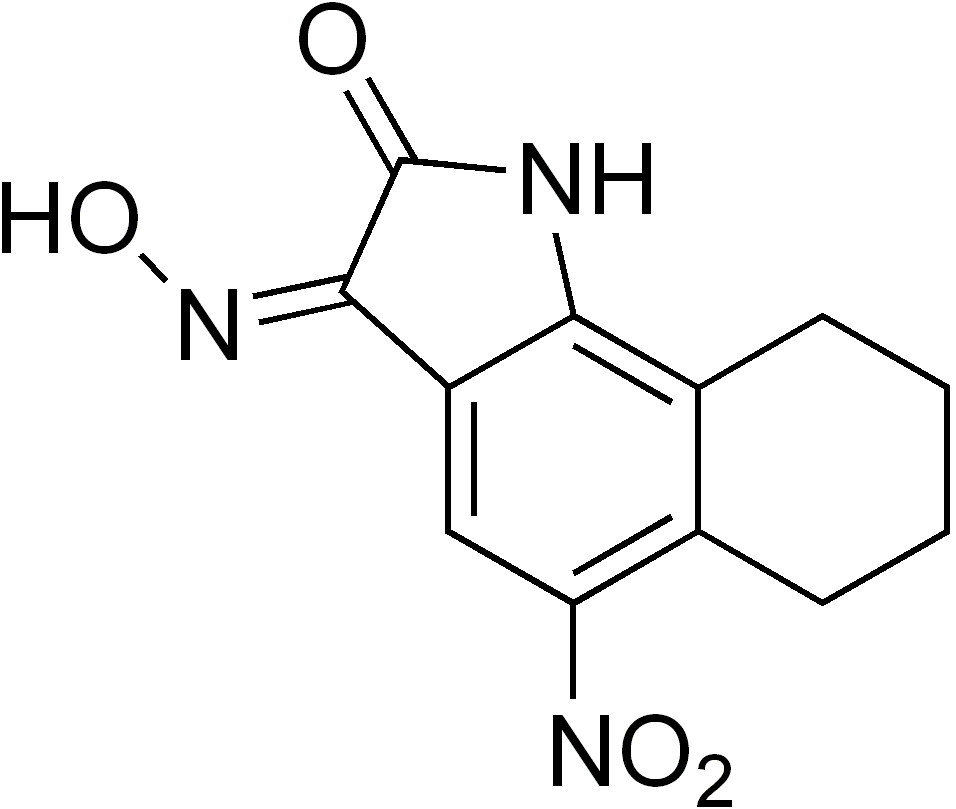

Names
- IUPAC name 5-Nitro-6,7,8,9-tetrahydro-1H-benzo[g]indole-2,3-dione 3-oxime

Identifiers
CAS Number	136623-01-3
3D model (JSmol)	Interactive image
ChemSpider	4470628
PubChem CID	5282252
UNII	00978E5H3R
CompTox Dashboard (EPA)	DTXSID30159858
- InChI: InChI=1S/C12H11N3O4/c16-12-11(14-17)8-5-4-6-7(10(8)13-12)2-1-3-9(6)15(18)19/h4-5,9,17H,1-3H2,(H,13,14,16) Key: FQJXCCSUWTUFRG-UHFFFAOYSA-N; InChI=1/C12H11N3O4/c16-12-11(14-17)8-5-4-6-7(10(8)13-12)2-1-3-9(6)15(18)19/h4-5,9,17H,1-3H2,(H,13,14,16) Key: FQJXCCSUWTUFRG-UHFFFAOYAV
- SMILES: O=C2NC1=C3C(CCCC3)=C([N+]([O-])=O)C=C1/C2=N/O

Properties
Chemical formula	C_{12}H_{11}N_{3}O_{4}
Molar mass	261.237 g·mol^{−1}
Appearance	Yellow solid
Solubility in water	Insoluble
Solubility in DMSO	>3 mg/mL
- Except where otherwise noted, data are given for materials in their standard state (at 25 °C [77 °F], 100 kPa). verify (what is ?) Infobox references

NS102 is a kainate receptor antagonist.
