= GRIK3 =

Protein-coding gene in humans

Identifiers
- Aliases: GRIK3, EAA5, GLR7, GLUR7, GluK3, GluR7a, glutamate ionotropic receptor kainate type subunit 3
- External IDs: OMIM: 138243; MGI: 95816; GeneCards: GRIK3

Gene location (Human)
Chr.	Chromosome 1 (human)
Band	1p34.3	Start	36,795,527 bp
Band	1p34.3	End	37,034,515 bp

Gene location (Mouse)
Chr.	Chromosome 4 (mouse)
Band	4 D2.2|4 58.91 cM	Start	125,384,493 bp
Band	4 D2.2|4 58.91 cM	End	125,607,966 bp
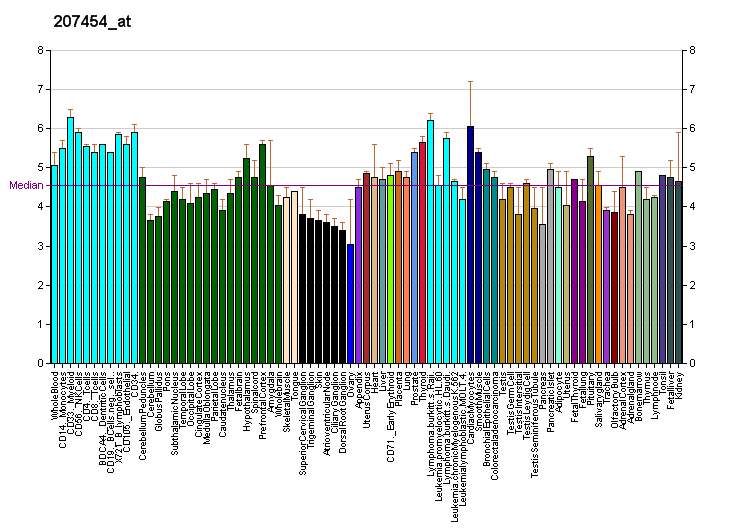
RNA expression pattern
Bgee	Human / Mouse (ortholog); Top expressed in: sural nerve; spinal ganglia; trigeminal ganglion; prefrontal cortex; primary visual cortex; endothelial cell; hypothalamus; cingulate gyrus; anterior cingulate cortex; right frontal lobe / Top expressed in: median eminence; arcuate nucleus; lateral septal nucleus; Rostral migratory stream; lateral hypothalamus; ventromedial nucleus; mammillary body; anterior amygdaloid area; paraventricular nucleus of hypothalamus; primary motor cortex; More reference expression data
BioGPS	More reference expression data
Gene ontology
Molecular function	kainate selective glutamate receptor activity; adenylate cyclase inhibiting G protein-coupled glutamate receptor activity; ion channel activity; extracellularly glutamate-gated ion channel activity; ligand-gated ion channel activity; ionotropic glutamate receptor activity; G protein-coupled receptor binding; glutamate receptor activity; signaling receptor activity; ligand-gated ion channel activity involved in regulation of presynaptic membrane potential; transmitter-gated ion channel activity involved in regulation of postsynaptic membrane potential
Cellular component	integral component of membrane; postsynaptic membrane; membrane; plasma membrane; synapse; integral component of plasma membrane; cell junction; dendrite cytoplasm; perikaryon; dendrite; terminal bouton; axon; kainate selective glutamate receptor complex; presynaptic membrane; glutamatergic synapse
Biological process	G protein-coupled glutamate receptor signaling pathway; glutamate receptor signaling pathway; ion transport; ion transmembrane transport; negative regulation of synaptic transmission, glutamatergic; ionotropic glutamate receptor signaling pathway; adenylate cyclase-inhibiting G protein-coupled glutamate receptor signaling pathway; regulation of membrane potential; excitatory postsynaptic potential; synaptic transmission, glutamatergic; modulation of chemical synaptic transmission; regulation of presynaptic membrane potential; regulation of postsynaptic membrane potential
Sources:Amigo / QuickGO
Orthologs
Databases	NCBI: entry; OMA: entry
Species	Human	Mouse
Entrez	2899	14807
Ensembl	ENSG00000163873	ENSMUSG00000001985
UniProt	Q13003	B1AS29
RefSeq (mRNA)	NM_000831	NM_001081097
RefSeq (protein)	NP_000822	NP_001074566
Location (UCSC)	Chr 1: 36.8 – 37.03 Mb	Chr 4: 125.38 – 125.61 Mb
PubMed search
- Wikidata
View/Edit Human	View/Edit Mouse

Glutamate receptor, ionotropic kainate 3 is a protein that in humans is encoded by the GRIK3 gene.

This gene encodes a protein that belongs to the ligand-gated ionic channel family. It can coassemble with either GRIK4 or GRIK5 to form heteromeric receptors and acts as an excitatory neurotransmitter at many synapses in the central nervous system. RNA editing in the mRNA has been reported.

== See also ==
- Kainate receptor
