= GRIK5 =

Protein-coding gene in the species Homo sapiens

Identifiers
- Aliases: GRIK5, EAA2, GRIK2, GluK5, KA2, glutamate ionotropic receptor kainate type subunit 5
- External IDs: OMIM: 600283; MGI: 95818; GeneCards: GRIK5

Gene location (Human)
Chr.	Chromosome 19 (human)
Band	19q13.2	Start	41,998,321 bp
Band	19q13.2	End	42,070,206 bp

Gene location (Mouse)
Chr.	Chromosome 7 (mouse)
Band	7 A3|7 13.73 cM	Start	25,009,849 bp
Band	7 A3|7 13.73 cM	End	25,072,346 bp
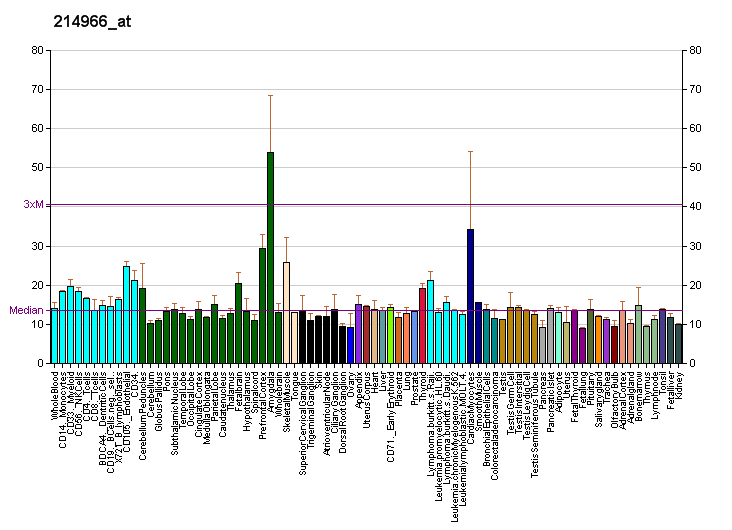

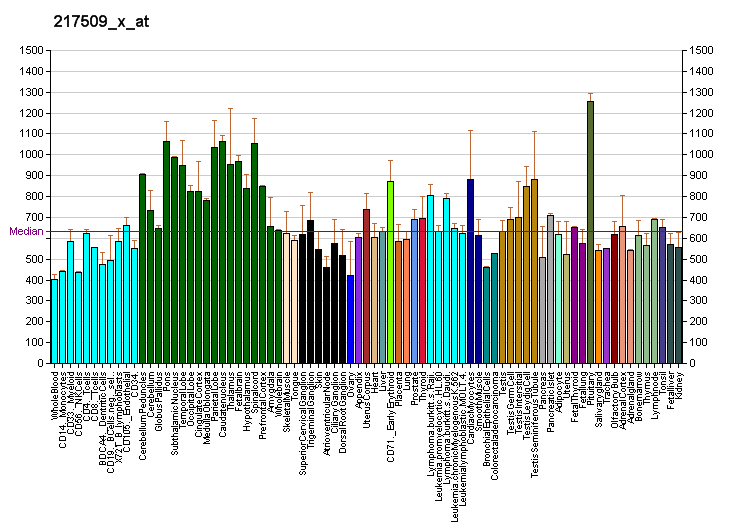
RNA expression pattern
Bgee	Human / Mouse (ortholog); Top expressed in: olfactory bulb; lateral nuclear group of thalamus; ventral tegmental area; subthalamic nucleus; vena cava; superior vestibular nucleus; inferior ganglion of vagus nerve; pons; external globus pallidus; pars compacta / Top expressed in: superior frontal gyrus; primary visual cortex; dentate gyrus of hippocampal formation granule cell; entorhinal cortex; perirhinal cortex; CA3 field; neural layer of retina; olfactory tubercle; ventricular zone; primary motor cortex; More reference expression data
BioGPS	More reference expression data
Gene ontology
Molecular function	glutamate receptor activity; PDZ domain binding; kainate selective glutamate receptor activity; SH3 domain binding; ion channel activity; ionotropic glutamate receptor activity; identical protein binding; extracellularly glutamate-gated ion channel activity; ligand-gated ion channel activity; signaling receptor activity; transmitter-gated ion channel activity involved in regulation of postsynaptic membrane potential
Cellular component	integral component of membrane; perikaryon; postsynaptic membrane; kainate selective glutamate receptor complex; membrane; postsynaptic density; synapse; cell junction; terminal bouton; axon; dendrite; soma; endoplasmic reticulum; neuron projection; ionotropic glutamate receptor complex; presynaptic membrane; nucleus; plasma membrane; hippocampal mossy fiber to CA3 synapse; glutamatergic synapse; integral component of postsynaptic membrane; integral component of presynaptic membrane; integral component of postsynaptic density membrane
Biological process	synaptic transmission, glutamatergic; regulation of membrane potential; ion transport; receptor clustering; protein retention in ER lumen; regulation of synaptic vesicle fusion to presynaptic active zone membrane; ion transmembrane transport; positive regulation of neuron apoptotic process; establishment of localization in cell; ionotropic glutamate receptor signaling pathway; excitatory postsynaptic potential; cellular response to glucose stimulus; chemical synaptic transmission; modulation of chemical synaptic transmission
Sources:Amigo / QuickGO
Orthologs
Databases	NCBI: entry; OMA: entry
Species	Human	Mouse
Entrez	2901	14809
Ensembl	ENSG00000105737	ENSMUSG00000003378
UniProt	Q16478	Q61626
RefSeq (mRNA)	NM_001301030; NM_002088	NM_008168; NM_001360067
RefSeq (protein)	NP_001287959; NP_002079	NP_032194; NP_001346996; NP_001389776; NP_001389777; NP_001389778
Location (UCSC)	Chr 19: 42 – 42.07 Mb	Chr 7: 25.01 – 25.07 Mb
PubMed search
- Wikidata
View/Edit Human	View/Edit Mouse

Glutamate receptor, ionotropic kainate 5 is a protein that in humans is encoded by the GRIK5 gene.

== Function ==
This gene encodes a protein that belongs to the glutamate-gated ionic channel family. Glutamate functions as the major excitatory neurotransmitter in the central nervous system through activation of ligand-gated ion channels and G protein-coupled membrane receptors. The protein encoded by this gene forms functional heteromeric kainate-preferring ionic channels with the subunits encoded by related gene family members.

== Interactions ==
GRIK5 has been shown to interact with DLG4 and GRIK2.

== See also ==
- Kainate receptor
