= Dihydrokainic acid =

Names
- IUPAC name (3S,4R)-3-(Carboxymethyl)-4-isopropyl-L-proline
- Systematic IUPAC name (2S,3S,4R)-3-(2-Hydroxy-2-oxoethyl)-4-(propan-2-yl)pyrrolidine-2-carboxylic acid
- Other names Dihydrokainate; DHK

Identifiers
CAS Number	52497-36-6
3D model (JSmol)	Interactive image
Beilstein Reference	84942
ChEBI	CHEBI:43562
ChEMBL	ChEMBL279561
ChemSpider	97018
PubChem CID	107883
UNII	MQ4LMC2HN5
- InChI: InChI=1S/C10H17NO4/c1-5(2)7-4-11-9(10(14)15)6(7)3-8(12)13/h5-7,9,11H,3-4H2,1-2H3,(H,12,13)(H,14,15)/t6-,7+,9-/m0/s1 Key: JQPDCKOQOOQUSC-OOZYFLPDSA-N
- SMILES: CC(C)[C@H]1CN[C@@H]([C@H]1CC(=O)O)C(=O)O

Properties
Chemical formula	C_{10}H_{17}NO_{4}
Molar mass	215.249 g·mol^{−1}

Hazards
- GHS labelling
Pictograms	(GHS07: Exclamation mark)
Signal word	Warning
Hazard statements	H302, H312, H332
Precautionary statements	P261, P264, P270, P271, P280, P301+P312, P302+P352, P304+P312, P304+P340, P312, P322, P330, P363, P501
- Except where otherwise noted, data are given for materials in their standard state (at 25 °C [77 °F], 100 kPa). Infobox references

Dihydrokainic acid is an organic compound that contains two carboxylic acid functional groups, making it a dicarboxylic acid. It is an inhibitor of the GLT-1 glutamate transporter.

== See also ==
- Kainic acid
