= CNQX =

Names
- Preferred IUPAC name 7-Nitro-2,3-dioxo-1,2,3,4-tetrahydroquinoxaline-6-carbonitrile

Identifiers
CAS Number	115066-14-3
3D model (JSmol)	Interactive image
ChEMBL	ChEMBL222418
ChemSpider	2951930
IUPHAR/BPS	5475
KEGG	C13668
PubChem CID	3721046
UNII	6OTE87SCCW
CompTox Dashboard (EPA)	DTXSID40893918
- InChI: InChI=1S/C9H4N4O4/c10-3-4-1-5-6(2-7(4)13(16)17)12-9(15)8(14)11-5/h1-2H,(H,11,14)(H,12,15) Key: RPXVIAFEQBNEAX-UHFFFAOYSA-N; InChI=1/C9H4N4O4/c10-3-4-1-5-6(2-7(4)13(16)17)12-9(15)8(14)11-5/h1-2H,(H,11,14)(H,12,15) Key: RPXVIAFEQBNEAX-UHFFFAOYAV
- SMILES: [O-][N+](=O)c1c(C#N)cc2c(c1)NC(=O)C(=O)N2

Properties
Chemical formula	C_{9}H_{4}N_{4}O_{4}
Molar mass	232.15 g/mol
- Except where otherwise noted, data are given for materials in their standard state (at 25 °C [77 °F], 100 kPa). verify (what is ?) Infobox references

CNQX or cyanquixaline (6-cyano-7-nitroquinoxaline-2,3-dione) is a competitive AMPA/kainate receptor antagonist. Its chemical formula is C_{9}H_{4}N_{4}O_{4}. CNQX is often used in the retina to block the responses of OFF-bipolar cells for electrophysiology recordings.

CNQX is an antagonist of α-Amino-3-hydroxy-5-methyl-4-isoxazolepropionic acid (AMPA)-type glutamate receptors (AMPARs). A study of the effects of CNQX on vestibuloocular reflex adaptation was done on goldfish by injecting CNQX into the vestibulo-cerebullum. The injection before adaptation significantly decreased and at the highest doses, completely inhibited the acquisition of adaptive reflex gain increases and decreases during a three-hour training period. Baseline performance was not affected by the CNQX injections. Injections of CNQX at the end of the training period shows a rapid loss of gained vestibuloocular reflex adaptation when the goldfish remained stationary in the dark. Instead of injecting CNQX immediately after training, injection made one to two hours after the initiation of the training period showed no signs of altering performance. CNQX injections did not have long-term permanent effects on the goldfish's ability to be retrained 48-hours later and was comparable to a control group that was not subjected to CNQX injections. CNQX did not inhibit adaptive changes while the injection was administered.

== Research applications ==
Excitatory synaptic transmission can be mediated through changing the responsiveness of AMPA receptors. One common method of altering responsiveness is changing the number of AMPA receptors in the postsynaptic membrane through endocytosis. Various stimuli, including CNQX, have diverse effects on AMPA receptor internalization. Known to be a competitive antagonist of the AMPA/kainate receptor, CNQX is used in studies investigating whether or not AMPA receptor endocytosis is ligand-dependent. In a culture of hippocampal neurons, CNQX partially inhibited AMPA receptor internalization that was stimulated by AMPA. However, when the hippocampal neurons were treated with CNQX alone, AMPA receptor internalization still took place in both the soma and dendrites. APV (NMDA receptor antagonist) or nimodipine (voltage gated calcium channel blocker) were also not able to block this internalization, suggesting that receptor activation is not a requirement for AMPA receptor endocytosis. The type of AMPA receptors endocytosed as a result of CNQX stimulation can also be identified using CNQX. In HEK cells tagged with GluR subunits, CNQX stimulates the internalization of GluR1 and GluR2 receptors. The intracellular region conserved in both GluR1 and GluR2 on the GluR2 C-terminal tail was identified and deleted. Deletion of this segment resulted in a decrease in constitutive endocytosis of the GluR2 receptor in HEK cells, pinpointing the sequence determining this effect.

CNQX is known to be a selective competitive antagonist for both AMPA receptors, which have an IC_{50} value of 400 nM, and kainate receptors, which have an IC_{50} value of 4 μM. It also noncompetitively inhibits NMDA receptors. CNQX is thus used to isolate GABA_{A} receptor mediated spontaneous inhibitory postsynaptic currents. The actions of CNQX on the frequency of spontaneous inhibitory postsynaptic currents are independent of their actions at ionotropic glutamate receptors. Although the EC_{50} value of CNQX on the frequency of spontaneous inhibitory postsynaptic currents is similar to the IC_{50} value on kainate receptors, the blockade of kainate receptors is not responsible for the actions of CNQX. NBQX is a quinoxaline derivative that is known to be more effective than CNQX in blocking kainate receptors, but there was not a large increase in the frequency of spontaneous inhibitory postsynaptic currents. Additionally, CNQX's effects were not replicated by kynurenate (glutamate receptor antagonist) or NS-102 (selective kainate receptor blocker) since there was no increase in the frequency of spontaneous inhibitory postsynaptic currents. Furthermore, D-AP5 and 7-CIK did not affect the frequency of spontaneous inhibitory postsynaptic currents, proving that the action of NMDA receptors do not account for the effects of CNQX.

== See also ==
- Quinoxalinedione
