= GRID1 =

Protein-coding gene in the species Homo sapiens

Identifiers
- Aliases: GRID1, GluD1, glutamate ionotropic receptor delta type subunit 1, GluD1-b
- External IDs: OMIM: 610659; MGI: 95812; GeneCards: GRID1

Gene location (Human)
Chr.	Chromosome 10 (human)
Band	10q23.1-q23.2	Start	85,599,552 bp
Band	10q23.1-q23.2	End	86,366,795 bp

Gene location (Mouse)
Chr.	Chromosome 14 (mouse)
Band	14 B|14 20.84 cM	Start	34,542,065 bp
Band	14 B|14 20.84 cM	End	35,305,336 bp
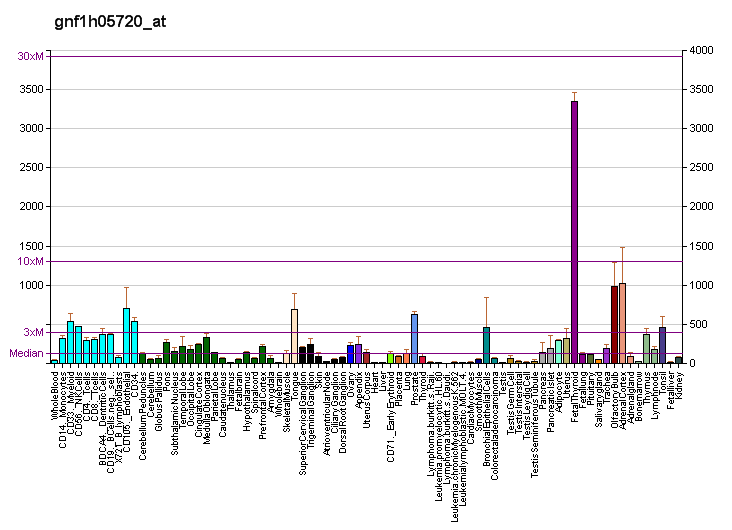
RNA expression pattern
Bgee	Human / Mouse (ortholog); Top expressed in: prefrontal cortex; C1 segment; nucleus accumbens; putamen; caudate nucleus; hypothalamus; substantia nigra; external globus pallidus; pars compacta; amygdala / Top expressed in: Region I of hippocampus proper; dentate gyrus of hippocampal formation granule cell; nucleus accumbens; dorsomedial hypothalamic nucleus; perirhinal cortex; entorhinal cortex; superior frontal gyrus; primary visual cortex; lumbar subsegment of spinal cord; substantia nigra; More reference expression data
BioGPS	More reference expression data
Gene ontology
Molecular function	ion channel activity; extracellularly glutamate-gated ion channel activity; ionotropic glutamate receptor activity; glutamate receptor activity; signaling receptor activity; transmitter-gated ion channel activity involved in regulation of postsynaptic membrane potential
Cellular component	integral component of membrane; cell junction; postsynaptic membrane; plasma membrane; synapse; extracellular exosome; membrane; glutamatergic synapse; integral component of postsynaptic density membrane
Biological process	social behavior; ion transmembrane transport; ionotropic glutamate receptor signaling pathway; ion transport; excitatory postsynaptic potential; transport; synaptic transmission, glutamatergic; modulation of chemical synaptic transmission; regulation of postsynaptic membrane potential
Sources:Amigo / QuickGO
Orthologs
Databases	NCBI: entry; OMA: entry
Species	Human	Mouse
Entrez	2894	14803
Ensembl	ENSG00000182771	ENSMUSG00000041078
UniProt	Q9ULK0	Q61627
RefSeq (mRNA)	NM_017551	NM_008166
RefSeq (protein)	NP_060021	NP_032192
Location (UCSC)	Chr 10: 85.6 – 86.37 Mb	Chr 14: 34.54 – 35.31 Mb
PubMed search
- Wikidata
View/Edit Human	View/Edit Mouse

Glutamate receptor delta-1 subunit also known as GluD1 or GluRδ1 is a transmembrane protein (1009 aa) encoded by the GRID1 gene. A C-terminal GluD1 splicing isoform (896 aa) has been described based on mRNA analysis.

== Function ==
This gene encodes a subunit of glutamate receptor ligand-gated ion channel. Most of these channels mediate fast excitatory synaptic transmission in the central nervous system. GluD1 is expressed in the central nervous system and is important in synaptic plasticity.

== Clinical significance ==
Several genetic epidemiology studies have shown a strong association between several variants of the GRID1 gene and increased risk of developing schizophrenia.

== See also ==
- GRID2
