= SYM-2081 =

Names
- IUPAC name (2S,4R)-2-Amino-4-methylpentanedioic acid
- Other names (2S,4R)-4-Methylglutamic acid

Identifiers
CAS Number	31137-74-3; 77842-39-8
3D model (JSmol)	Interactive image
ChEBI	CHEBI:228160
ChEMBL	ChEMBL288166
ChemSpider	86558
IUPHAR/BPS	10821708
PubChem CID	95883
CompTox Dashboard (EPA)	DTXSID901300044
- InChI: InChI=1S/C6H11NO4/c1-3(5(8)9)2-4(7)6(10)11/h3-4H,2,7H2,1H3,(H,8,9)(H,10,11)/t3-,4+/m1/s1 Key: KRKRAOXTGDJWNI-DMTCNVIQSA-N
- SMILES: C[C@H](C[C@@H](C(=O)O)N)C(=O)O

Properties
Chemical formula	C_{6}H_{11}NO_{4}
Molar mass	161.157 g·mol^{−1}
Appearance	White solid
- Except where otherwise noted, data are given for materials in their standard state (at 25 °C [77 °F], 100 kPa). Infobox references

SYM-2081 is a highly selective agonist for the kainate receptor. This potent agonist has nearly 3,000 fold- and 200-fold selectivity for kainate receptors over AMPA and NMDA receptors, respectively. Given its potency and selectivity, it is a useful ligand for studying the role of kainate receptors in the central nervous system.

== Synthesis ==
SYM-2081 can be prepared through diastereomeric mixture via enzymatic synthesis, but the yield of this reaction is small. SYM-2081 can be produced at a multi-gram scale by starting with (S)-1-t-butoxycarbonyl-5-t-butyldiphenylsilyoxymethylpyrrolidine-2-one and treating it with one equivalent of lithium bis(trimethylsilyl)amide in tetrahydrofuran (THF) at -78 °C. The resulting product was mixed with excess iodomethane which yielded 4-methylated products and some unreacted starting material. The trans product was purified through column chromatography. Next, the product was crystallized by hexanes. Tetrabutylammonium fluoride was used for its primary alcohol to selectively remove the tert-butyldiphenylsilyl (TBDPS) protecting group. The Sharpless procedure was used to oxidize the alcohol. This intermediate was hydrolyzed with lithium hydroxide in aqueous THF. Finally, the compound was treated with trifluoroacetic acid (TFA) in dichloromethane to produce (2S,4R)-4-methylglutamic acid.

== Research ==
Some research has indicated that having the methyl group in SYM-2081 is essential for its potency. SYM-2081 was 20 times more potent than its (2R,4R) isomer and 1000 times more potent than its (2S,4S) isomer.
