= VPREB3 =

Protein-coding gene in the species Homo sapiens

Identifiers
- Aliases: VPREB3, 8HS20, N27C7-2, pre-B lymphocyte 3, V-set pre-B cell surrogate light chain 3
- External IDs: OMIM: 605017; MGI: 98938; GeneCards: VPREB3

Gene location (Human)
Chr.	Chromosome 22 (human)
Band	22q11.23|22q11	Start	23,752,743 bp
Band	22q11.23|22q11	End	23,754,425 bp

Gene location (Mouse)
Chr.	Chromosome 10 (mouse)
Band	10|10 C1	Start	75,778,891 bp
Band	10|10 C1	End	75,785,491 bp
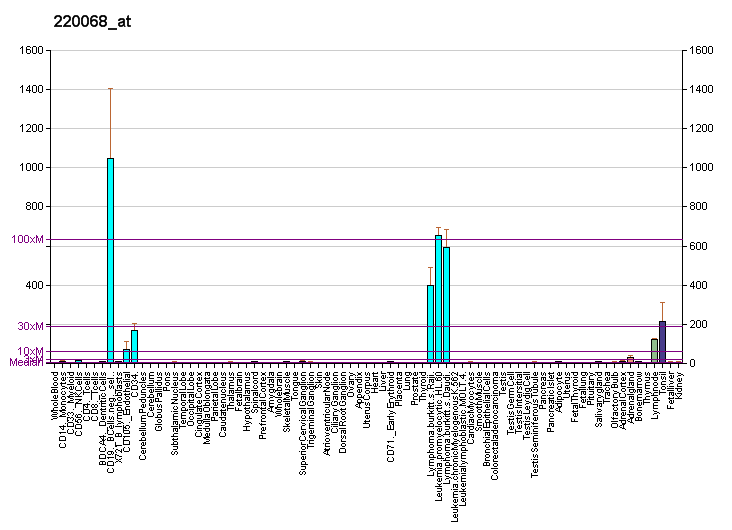
RNA expression pattern
Bgee	Human / Mouse (ortholog); Top expressed in: lymph node; spleen; appendix; granulocyte; mucosa of ileum; bone marrow; mucosa of transverse colon; bone marrow cell; blood; right adrenal gland / Top expressed in: tibiofemoral joint; morula; granulocyte; tail of embryo; spleen; embryo; genital tubercle; embryo; blood; blastocyst; More reference expression data
BioGPS	More reference expression data
Orthologs
Databases	NCBI: entry; OMA: entry
Species	Human	Mouse
Entrez	29802	22364
Ensembl	ENSG00000128218	ENSMUSG00000000903
UniProt	Q9UKI3	n/a
RefSeq (mRNA)	NM_013378	NM_009514; NM_001358532
RefSeq (protein)	NP_037510	n/a
Location (UCSC)	Chr 22: 23.75 – 23.75 Mb	Chr 10: 75.78 – 75.79 Mb
PubMed search
- Wikidata
View/Edit Human	View/Edit Mouse

Pre-B lymphocyte protein 3 is a protein that in humans is encoded by the VPREB3 gene.

The VPREB3 gene product is the human homologue of the mouse VpreB3 (8HS20) protein, and is specifically expressed in cell lines representative of all stages of B-lymphocyte differentiation. It is also related to VPREB1 and other members of the immunoglobulin supergene family. The VPREB3 protein apparently associates with membrane mu heavy chains early in the course of pre-B cell receptor biosynthesis. The precise function of VPREB3 is not known, but it may contribute to mu chain transport in pre-B cells. In humans, besides the bone marrow and secondary lymphoid tissues such as the tonsils, the VPREB3 protein is also present in Purkinje cells of the cerebellum and in the zona glomerulosa of the adrenal.
