= Fanapanel =

Chemical compound

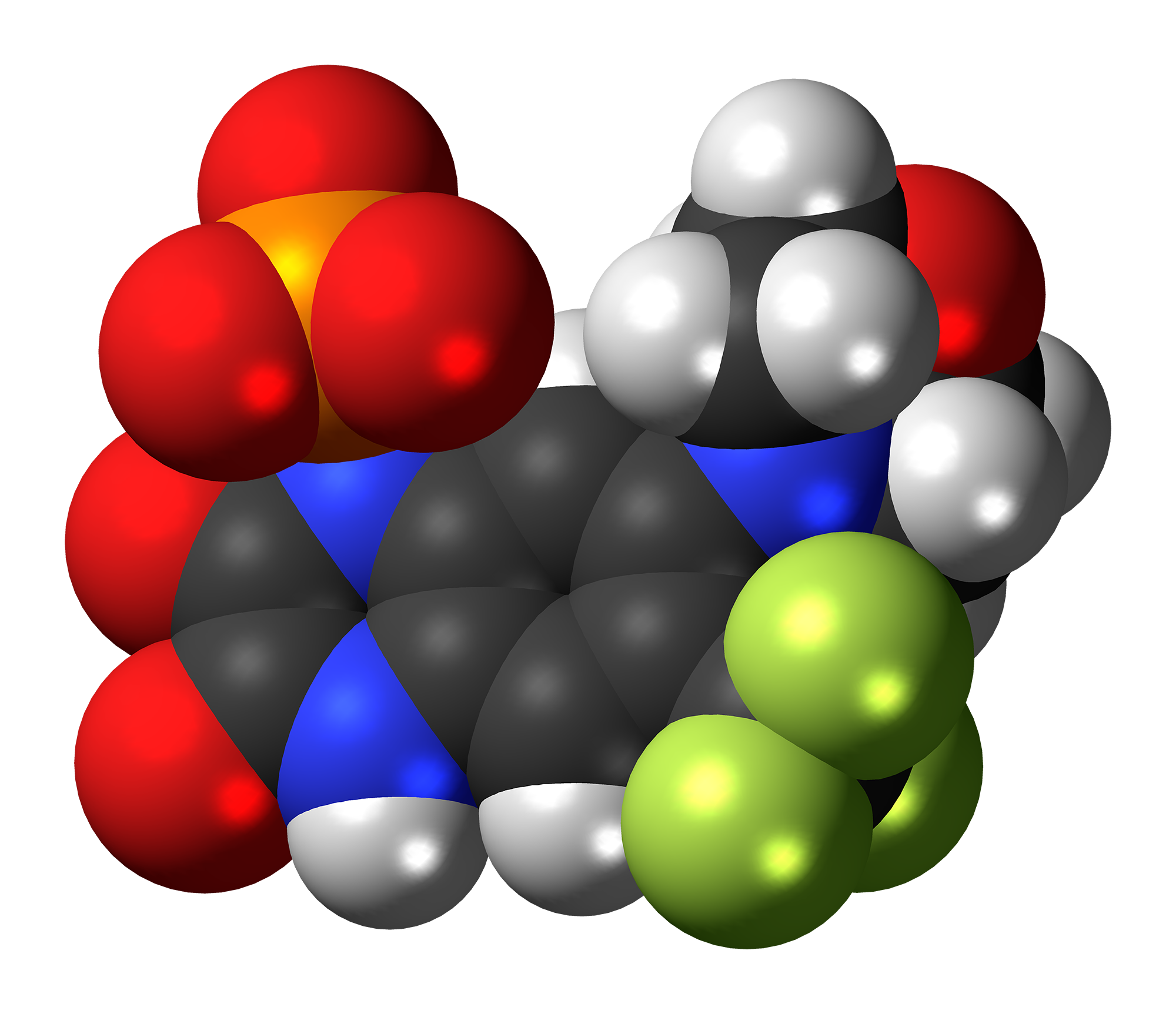

Clinical data
- ATC code: None

Identifiers
- IUPAC name: {[7-(4-Morpholinyl)-2,3-dioxo-6-(trifluoromethyl)-3,4-dihydro-1(2H)-quinoxalinyl]methyl}phosphonic acid
- CAS Number: 161605-73-8
- PubChem CID: 208953
- ChemSpider: 181046
- UNII: E3AP71EM0O
- ChEMBL: ChEMBL19892
- CompTox Dashboard (EPA): DTXSID7046093

Chemical and physical data
- Formula: C_{14}H_{15}F_{3}N_{3}O_{6}P
- Molar mass: 409.258 g·mol^{−1}
- 3D model (JSmol): Interactive image
- SMILES: c1c(c(cc2c1[nH]c(=O)c(=O)n2CP(=O)(O)O)N3CCOCC3)C(F)(F)F
- InChI: InChI=1S/C14H15F3N3O6P/c15-14(16,17)8-5-9-11(6-10(8)19-1-3-26-4-2-19)20(7-27(23,24)25)13(22)12(21)18-9/h5-6H,1-4,7H2,(H,18,21)(H2,23,24,25); Key:WZMQMKNCWDCCMT-UHFFFAOYSA-N

Fanapanel (INN, code name ZK-200775), also known as MPQX, is a quinoxalinedione derivative drug which acts as a competitive antagonist of the AMPA receptor. It was under development by Schering AG for the treatment of cerebral ischemia associated with stroke and trauma, but clinical trials were halted for safety reasons related to possible glial cell toxicity and due to intolerable side effects such as excessive sedation, reduction in consciousness (consisting of stupor and coma), and transient neurological deterioration. The drug was also observed to produce visual alteration and impairment, including blurred vision, strongly impaired color perception, and reduced visual acuity and dark vision, side effects thought to be caused by blockade of AMPA receptors in the retina.
