= AP-7 (drug) =

Names
- Preferred IUPAC name 2-Amino-7-phosphonoheptanoic acid

Identifiers
CAS Number	85797-13-3
3D model (JSmol)	Interactive image; Interactive image
ChEMBL	ChEMBL274440
ChemSpider	3010
PubChem CID	3122
UNII	P34K80CUSM
CompTox Dashboard (EPA)	DTXSID501017823 DTXSID101000167, DTXSID501017823
- InChI: InChI=1S/C7H16NO5P/c8-6(7(9)10)4-2-1-3-5-14(11,12)13/h6H,1-5,8H2,(H,9,10)(H2,11,12,13) Key: MYDMWESTDPJANS-UHFFFAOYSA-N; InChI=1/C7H16NO5P/c8-6(7(9)10)4-2-1-3-5-14(11,12)13/h6H,1-5,8H2,(H,9,10)(H2,11,12,13)
- SMILES: O=P(O)(O)CCCCCC(N)C(=O)O; O=P(O)(O)CCCCCC(C(=O)O)N

Properties
Chemical formula	C_{7}H_{16}NO_{5}P
Molar mass	225.179 g/mol
Density	1.39 g/mL
Boiling point	480.1 °C (896.2 °F; 753.2 K)
- Except where otherwise noted, data are given for materials in their standard state (at 25 °C [77 °F], 100 kPa). verify (what is ?) Infobox references

AP-7 is a selective NMDA receptor (NMDAR) antagonist that competitively inhibits the glutamate binding site and thus activation of NMDAR. It has anticonvulsant effects.

AP-7 functions specifically as a NMDA recognition site blocker, in contrast with 7-chlorokynurenate, which acts as a glycine site modulation blocker.

== Animal studies ==
AP-7 injected directly into the dorsal periaqueductal grey (DPAG) of rats produced an anxiolytic effect, whereas direct injection outside of the DPAG did not elicit anxiolytic effects, suggesting that the anxiolytic effect of NMDA antagonists in rats may depend on their action in the DPAG.

The DPAG of the brain is thought to deal with fear-like defensive behavior via NMDA and glycine B receptors. These excitatory glutamate receptors work with the inhibitory GABA receptors to achieve equilibrium in the DPAG of the brain.

AP-7 has been known to cause muscle rigidity and catalepsy in rats following bilateral microinjections (0.02-0.5 nmol) into the globus pallidus and ventral-posterior portions of the caudate-putamen.

The optically pure D-(−)-2-amino-7-phosphonoheptanoic acid [D-AP7], has also been examined. In groups of hypoxia-treated rats, D-AP7 enhanced motility, exhibited anxiogenic-like effect and impaired consolidation in passive avoidance. Both AP-7 and D-AP7 function as potent, specific antagonists of the NMDA receptor.

== See also ==
- APV (drug)
