= Kainic acid =

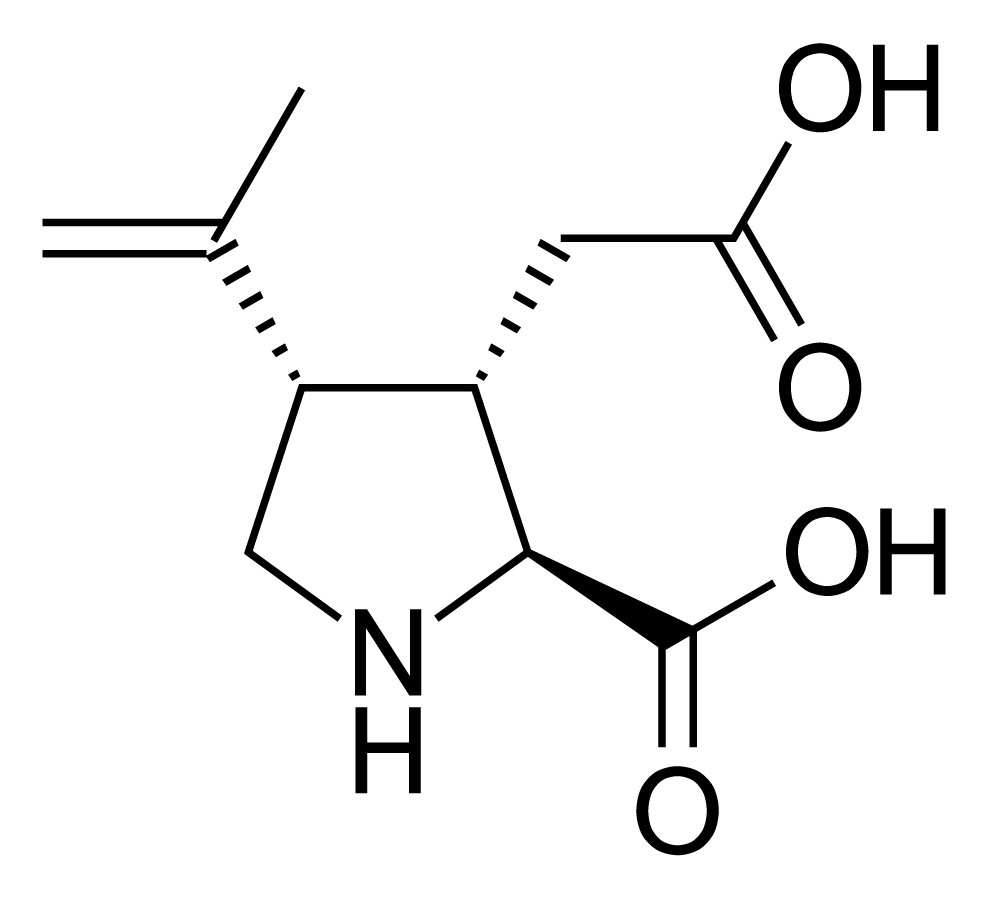
- Stereo, skeletal formula of kainic acid

Names
- IUPAC name (3S,4S)-3-(Carboxymethyl)-4-(prop-1-en-2-yl)-L-proline
- Systematic IUPAC name (2S,3S,4S)-3-(Carboxymethyl)-4-(prop-1-en-2-yl)pyrrolidine-2-carboxylic acid
- Other names 2-Carboxy-3-carboxymethyl-4-isopropenyl-pyrrolidine

Identifiers
CAS Number	487-79-6
3D model (JSmol)	Interactive image
Beilstein Reference	86660
ChEBI	CHEBI:31746
ChEMBL	ChEMBL27527
ChemSpider	9837
KEGG	C12819
MeSH	Kainic+acid
PubChem CID	10255
UNII	SIV03811UC
CompTox Dashboard (EPA)	DTXSID7040526
- InChI: InChI=1S/C10H15NO4/c1-5(2)7-4-11-9(10(14)15)6(7)3-8(12)13/h6-7,9,11H,1,3-4H2,2H3,(H,12,13)(H,14,15) Key: VLSMHEGGTFMBBZ-UHFFFAOYSA-N
- SMILES: OC(=O)[C@H]1NC[C@H](C(C)=C)[C@@H]1CC(=O)O

Properties
Chemical formula	C_{10}H_{15}NO_{4}
Molar mass	213.233 g·mol^{−1}
Melting point	215 °C (419 °F; 488 K) (decomposes)
log P	0.635
Acidity (pK_{a})	2.031
Basicity (pK_{b})	11.966

Structure
Crystal structure	Monoclinic
- Except where otherwise noted, data are given for materials in their standard state (at 25 °C [77 °F], 100 kPa). verify (what is ?) Infobox references

Kainic acid, or kainate, is an acid that naturally occurs in some seaweed. Kainic acid is a potent neuroexcitatory amino acid agonist that acts by activating receptors for glutamate, the principal excitatory neurotransmitter in the central nervous system. Glutamate is produced by the cell's metabolic processes and there are four major classifications of glutamate receptors: NMDA receptors, AMPA receptors, kainate receptors, and the metabotropic glutamate receptors. Kainic acid is an agonist for kainate receptors, a type of ionotropic glutamate receptor. Kainate receptors likely control a sodium channel that produces excitatory postsynaptic potentials (EPSPs) when glutamate binds.

Kainic acid is commonly injected into laboratory animal models to study the effects of experimental ablation. Kainic acid is a direct agonist of the glutamic kainate receptors and large doses of concentrated solutions produce immediate neuronal death by overstimulating neurons to death. Such damage and death of neurons is referred to as an excitotoxic lesion. Thus, in large, concentrated doses kainic acid can be considered a neurotoxin, and in small doses of dilute solution kainic acid will chemically stimulate neurons. In fact, kainate seems to regulate serotonergic activity in the vertebrate retina.

Electrical stimulation of designated areas of the brain are generally administered by passing an electric current through a wire that is inserted into the brain to lesion a particular area of the brain. Electrical stimulation indiscriminately destroys anything in the vicinity of the electrode tip, including neural bodies and axons of neurons passing through; therefore it is difficult to attribute the effects of the lesion to a single area. Chemical stimulation is typically administered through a cannula that is inserted into the brain via stereotactic surgery. Chemical stimulation, while more complicated than electrical stimulation, has the distinct advantage of activating cell bodies, but not nearby axons, because only cell bodies and subsequent dendrites contain glutamate receptors. Therefore, chemical stimulation by kainic acid is more localized than electrical stimulation. Both chemical and electrical lesions potentially cause additional damage to the brain due to the very nature of the inserted electrode or cannula. Therefore, the most effective ablation studies are performed in comparison to a sham lesion that duplicates all the steps of producing a brain lesion except the one that actually causes the brain damage, that is, injection of kainic acid or administration of an electrical shock.

== Biosynthesis ==
In 2019, Chekan et al. were able to use bioinformatic tools to look for domoic acid gene homologs in the seaweed Digenea simplex. Researchers identified a cluster containing genes identified as the kainic acid biosynthesis (kab) genes. This cluster contains an annotated N-prenyltransferase, α-ketoglutarate (αKG)-dependent dioxygenase, and several retrotransposable elements. To confirm production of kainic acid through the identified cluster, Chekan et al. expressed the genes in Escherichia coli and validated the enzymatic functions of each proposed gene.

The first step of the pathway involves the N-prenyltransferase, KabA, which allows for the prenylation of L-glutamic acid with dimethylallyl pyrophosphate (DMAPP) to form the intermediate N-dimethylallyl-l-glutamic acid (prekainic acid). KabC then catalyzes the stereocontrolled formation of the trisubstituted pyrrolidine ring, taking prekainic acid to the final kainic acid. KabC was also able to produce another kainic acid isomer, kainic acid lactone.

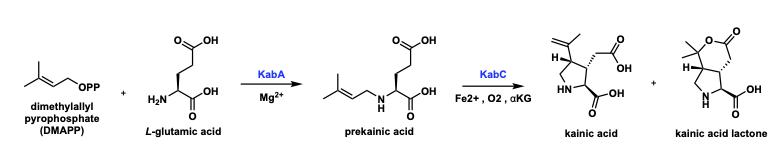
Biosynthesis of kainic acid and kainic acid lactone

== Occurrence ==
Kainic acid was originally isolated from the seaweeds Digenea simplex and Chondria armata in 1953. They are called "Kainin-sou" or "Makuri" in Japan, and are used as an anthelmintic.

== Pharmacological activity ==
Kainic acid is utilised in primary neuronal cell cultures and in the acute brain slice preparation to study the physiological effect of excitotoxicity and assess the neuroprotective capabilities of potential therapeutics.

Kainic acid is a potent central nervous system excitant that is used in epilepsy research to induce seizures in experimental animals, at a typical dose of 10–30 mg/kg in mice. In addition to inducing seizures, kainic acid is excitotoxic and epileptogenic. Kainic acid induces seizures via activation of kainate receptors containing the GluK2 subunit and also through activation of AMPA receptors, for which it serves as a partial agonist. Also, infusion with kainic acid in the hippocampus of animals results in major damage of pyramidal neurons and subsequent seizure activity. Supply shortages beginning in 2000 have caused the cost of kainic acid to rise significantly.

== Applications ==
- neuroscience research
  - neurodegenerative agent
  - modeling of epilepsy
  - modeling of Alzheimer's disease

== See also ==
- Dihydrokainic acid
- Domoic acid
- Kainate receptor
