= Ionotropic glutamate receptor =

Ligand-gated ion channels

Lig_chan
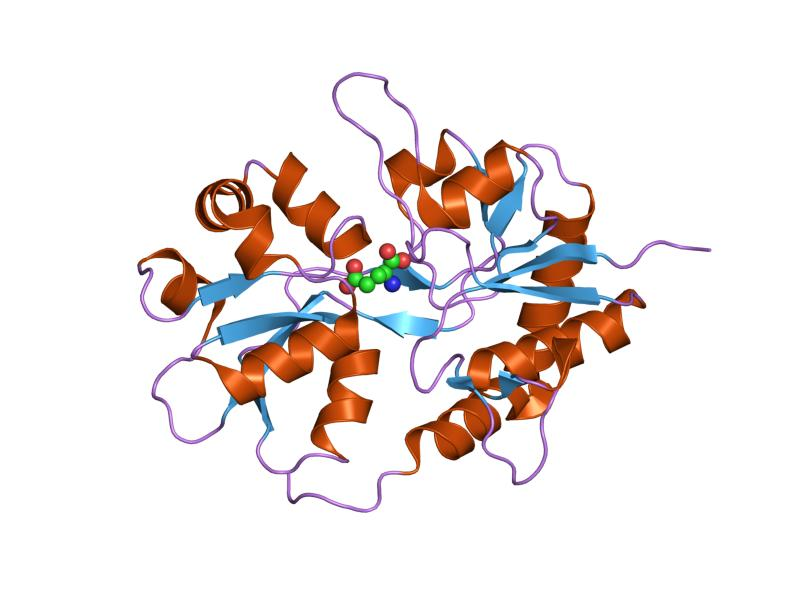
- x-ray structure of the glur6 ligand binding core (s1s2a) in complex with glutamate at 1.65 a resolution

Identifiers
- Symbol: Lig_chan
- Pfam: PF00060
- Pfam clan: CL0030
- InterPro: IPR001320
- SCOP2: 1gr2 / SCOPe / SUPFAM
- TCDB: 1.A.10
- OPM superfamily: 8
- OPM protein: 3kg2
Available protein structures:
- PDB: IPR001320 PF00060 (ECOD; PDBsum)
- AlphaFold: IPR001320; PF00060

Ionotropic glutamate receptors (iGluRs) are ligand-gated ion channels that are activated by the neurotransmitter glutamate. They mediate the majority of excitatory synaptic transmission throughout the central nervous system and are key players in synaptic plasticity, which is important for learning and memory. iGluRs have been divided into four subtypes on the basis of their ligand binding properties (pharmacology) and sequence similarity: AMPA receptors, kainate receptors, NMDA receptors and delta receptors (see below).

AMPA receptors are the main charge carriers during basal transmission, permitting influx of sodium ions to depolarise the postsynaptic membrane. NMDA receptors are blocked by magnesium ions and therefore only permit ion flux following prior depolarisation. This enables them to act as coincidence detectors for synaptic plasticity. Calcium influx through NMDA receptors leads to persistent modifications in the strength of synaptic transmission.

iGluRs are tetramers (they are formed of four subunits). All subunits have a shared architecture with four domain layers: two extracellular clamshell domains called the N-terminal domain (NTD) and ligand-binding domain (LBD; which binds glutamate), the transmembrane domain (TMD) that forms the ion channel, and an intracellular C-terminal domain (CTD).

== Human proteins/genes encoding iGluR subunits ==
AMPA receptors: GluA1/GRIA1; GluA2/GRIA2; GluA3/GRIA3; GluA4/GRIA4;

delta receptors: GluD1/GRID1; GluD2/GRID2;

kainate receptors: GluK1/GRIK1; GluK2/GRIK2; GluK3/GRIK3; GluK4/GRIK4; GluK5/GRIK5;

NMDA receptors: GluN1/GRIN1; GluN2A/GRIN2A; GluN2B/GRIN2B; GluN2C/GRIN2C; GluN2D/GRIN2D; GluN3A/GRIN3A; GluN3B/GRIN3B;
