= Kainate receptor =

Class of ionotropic glutamate receptors

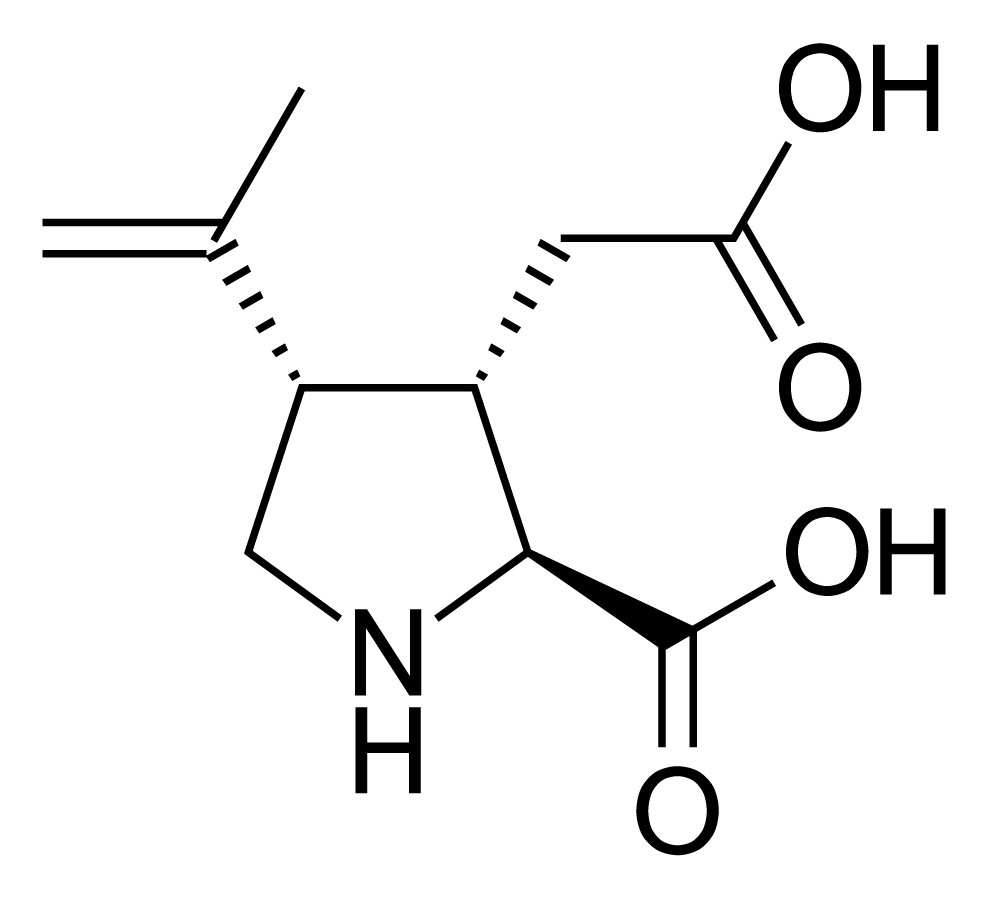
Kainic acid

Glutamic acid

Kainate receptors, or kainic acid receptors (KARs), are ionotropic receptors that respond to the neurotransmitter glutamate. They were first identified as a distinct receptor type through their selective activation by the agonist kainate, a drug first isolated from the algae Digenea simplex. They have been traditionally classified as a non-NMDA-type receptor, along with the AMPA receptor. KARs are less understood than AMPA and NMDA receptors, the other ionotropic glutamate receptors. Postsynaptic kainate receptors are involved in excitatory neurotransmission. Presynaptic kainate receptors have been implicated in inhibitory neurotransmission by modulating release of the inhibitory neurotransmitter GABA through a presynaptic mechanism.

== Structure ==
There are five types of kainate receptor subunits, GluR_{5} (GRIK1), GluR_{6} (GRIK2), GluR_{7} (GRIK3), KA1 (GRIK4) and KA2 (GRIK5), which are similar to AMPA and NMDA receptor subunits and can be arranged in different ways to form a tetramer, a four subunit receptor. GluR_{5-7} can form homomers (ex. a receptor composed entirely of GluR5) and heteromers (ex. a receptor composed of both GluR_{5} and GluR_{6}), however, KA1 and KA2 can only form functional receptors by combining with one of the GluR_{5-7} subunits.

Since 2009 the kainate receptor subunits have been renamed to correspond with their gene name. Hence GluR5-7 are now GluK1-3 and KA1 and KA2 are GluK4 and GluK5, respectively.

Each KAR subunit begins with a 400-residue extracellular N-terminal domain, which plays a key role in assembly, followed by the first segment of the neurotransmitter-binding cleft, called S1. This segment then passes through the cell membrane, forming the first of three membrane-spanning regions, M1. The M2 segment then begins on the cytoplasmic face of the membrane, pushes into the cell membrane about halfway, and then dips back out to the cytoplasm. This segment, termed the "p loop," determines the calcium permeability of the receptor. M2 turns into M3, another transmembrane segment which emerges on the extracellular face to complete the neurotransmitter binding site (a portion called S2). M4 begins extracellularly, and passes again through the membrane into the cytoplasm, forming the C-terminal of the protein.

Differences in the ligand binding pocket allow for the development of moderately subunit-selective kainate receptor agonists and antagonists.

== Conductance ==
The ion channel formed by kainate receptors is permeable to sodium and potassium ions. The single channel conductance of kainate receptor channels is similar to that of AMPA channels, at about 20 pS. However, rise and decay times for postsynaptic potentials generated by KARs are slower than for AMPA postsynaptic potentials. Their permeability to Ca^{2+} is usually very slight but varies with subunits and RNA editing at the tip of the p loop.

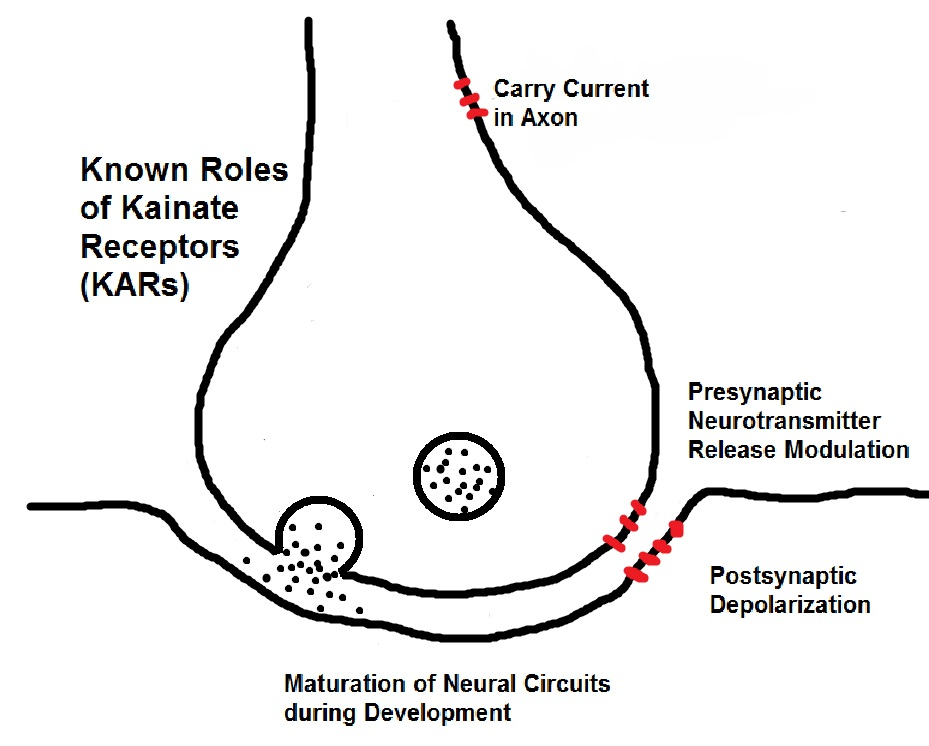
Known KAR Roles in Neurons

== Heteromers ==
Many kainate receptors appear to exist as heteromers. The 'high-affinity' subunits GluK4 and GluK5 can only form functional channels as heteromers with 'low-affinity' subunits (GluK1-3).

== Roles ==
Kainate receptors have both presynaptic and postsynaptic actions. They have a somewhat more limited distribution in the brain than AMPA and NMDA receptors, and their function is less well defined. The convulsant kainic acid induces seizures, in part, by activation of kainate receptors containing the GluK2 subunit and also probably via AMPA receptors Activation of kainate receptors containing the GluK1 subunit can also induce seizures but deletion of this subunit does not reduce seizure susceptibility to kainate or in other seizure models. Deletion of either GluK1 or GluK2 does not alter kindling epileptogenesis or the expression of kindled seizures.

Recent investigation through voltage clamping has shown that kainate receptors have more than just an ionotropic (or directly changing a membrane's conductivity) role in neurons. The metabotropic (or indirect through secondary protein pathways) effect has been verified through many accessory proteins and sustained current through G-protein cascades. The specific link of this pathway remains to be found, as well as the explanation for why the polarization and distribution of KARs varies so much across neurons and brain regions. The proteins have been shown to pace the receptors and help explain KAR's role in maturation of neural circuits during development.

One of the larger connections and roles that kainate receptors have been shown to have is to several neurological diseases and conditions. KAR expression and distribution has shown a linkage to schizophrenia, depression, autism, Huntington's, bipolar disorder, and epilepsy among others. Most come through mutations of GluK1-5. The causation is unclear and the subject of further investigation.

== Plasticity ==
Unlike AMPA receptors, kainate receptors play only a minor role in signaling at synapses. Kainate receptors have a subtle role in synaptic plasticity, affecting the likelihood that the postsynaptic cell will fire in response to future stimulation. Activating kainate receptors in the presynaptic cell can affect the amount of neurotransmitters that are released This effect may occur quickly and last for a long time, and the effects of repetitive stimulation of KARs can be additive over time.

== Ligands ==
=== Agonists ===
- 5-Iodowillardiine
- ATPA
- Domoic acid
- Glutamic acid (glutamate) – the endogenous agonist
- Kainic acid – the agonist after which the receptor is named
- LY-339,434
- SYM-2081

=== Antagonists ===
- CNQX
- DNQX
- Ethanol – non-selective
- NS102
- Kynurenic acid – endogenous ligand
- Tezampanel – also an AMPAR antagonist
- UBP-302
- UBP-310
- UBP-316 (ACET)
- Theanine

== See also ==
- NMDA receptor
- AMPA receptor
- Long term potentiation
