= List of investigational headache and migraine drugs =

Investigational antimigraine drugs

This is a list of investigational headache and migraine drugs, or drugs that are currently under development for clinical use in the treatment of headaches and/or migraines but are not yet approved. They may also be referred to as investigational antimigraine agents.

Chemical/generic names are listed first, with developmental code names, synonyms, and brand names in parentheses. The format of list items is "Name (Synonyms) – Mechanism of Action – Indication [Reference]".

This list was last comprehensively updated in September 2025. It is likely to become outdated with time.

== Under development ==
=== Phase 3 ===
- Botulinum toxin A (AboBoNT-A; AbobotulinumtoxinA; Alluzience; Azzalure; BoNT-A; BTX-A; Dysport; Reloxin) – acetylcholine release inhibitor and neuromuscular blocking agent – migraine
- Botulinum toxin A (Bocouture; Incobotulinum toxin A; NT-201; Vibe/Xeomin; ViXe; Xeomeen; Xeomin; Zeomaine) – acetylcholine release inhibitor and neuromuscular blocking agent – migraine
- Eptinezumab (ALD-403; Lu-AG09221; Vyepti) – monoclonal antibody against calcitonin gene-related peptide (CGRP) – cluster headache
- Naproxen/rizatriptan (rizatriptan/naproxen) – combination of naproxen (COX inhibitor/NSAID) and rizatriptan (triptan) – migraine
- Promethazine/sumatriptan (CL-H1T) – combination of promethazine (anthistamine, anticholinergic, other actions) and sumatriptan (triptan) – migraine

=== Phase 2/3 ===
- Acetaminophen/naltrexone – combination of acetaminophen (analgesic) and naltrexone (opioid receptor antagonist) – migraine

=== Phase 2 ===
- AGX-201 (histamine dihydrochloride salt) – histamine H_{1} receptor antagonist and histamine H_{3} receptor agonist – migraine
- BHV-2100 – transient receptor potential cation channel subfamily M member 3 (TRPM3) antagonist – migraine
- Botulinum toxin A longer acting (IPN-10200; mrBoNT) – acetylcholine release inhibitor and neuromuscular blocking agent – migraine
- CAM-01 (C-AM-01) – undefined mechanism of action – migraine
- Dihydroergotamine mesilate (DFN-19) – non-selective monoamine receptor modulator and ergoline – migraine
- Doxepin intranasal (Dolorac) – tricyclic antidepressant (non-selective monoamine reuptake inhibitor and receptor modulator and other actions) – headache
- Elismetrep (K-304; MT-8554) – transient receptor potential cation channel subfamily M member 8 (TRPM8) antagonist – migraine
- Erenumab (Aimovig; AMG-334) – monoclonal antibody against calcitonin gene-related peptide receptor (CGRPR) – headache
- Eslicarbazepine acetate (Aptiom; BIA 2-093; ESL; Exalief; SEP-0002093; SEP-2093; Stedesa; Zebinix) – sodium channel blocker – migraine
- IONIS-PKKRx (ISIS-546254; ISIS-PKKRx) – antisense oligonucleotide against kallikrein – migraine
- Ketoprofen topical (ELS-M11; Topofen) – COX inhibitor/NSAID – migraine
- LAT-8881 (AOD9604; Tyr-hGH171191) – human growth hormone protein fragment and lanthionine synthetase C-like protein (LanCL) ligand – migraine
- LU-AG09222 (ALD-1910) – monoclonal antibody against pituitary adenylate cyclase-activating polypeptide (PACAP) – migraine
- LY-3451838 (PACAP-38 antibody) – monoclonal antibody against pituitary adenylate cyclase-activating polypeptide (PACAP) – migraine
- Lysergic acid diethylamide (LSD; MM-120) – non-selective serotonin receptor agonist and psychedelic hallucinogen – cluster headache
- MTX-101 – undefined mechanism of action – migraine
- Pasireotide (Signifor; SOM-230) – somatostatin receptor agonist – cluster headache
- Prabotulinumtoxin A (ABP-450; DWP-450; Evosyal; Jeuveau; Nabota; Nuceiva) – acetylcholine release inhibitor and neuromuscular blocking agent – migraine
- Sepranolone (isoallopregnanolone; UC-1010) – GABA_{A} receptor negative allosteric modulator and neurosteroid – menstrual migraine
- TRV-250 – δ-opioid receptor (DOR) agonist – migraine
- (R)-Verapamil – calcium channel blocker and other actions – cluster headache
- Zelminemab (AMG-301) – monoclonal antibody against pituitary adenylate cyclase-activating polypeptide type I receptor (PAC_{1}R) – migraine

=== Phase 1/2 ===
- XC-101 (XC101; XC101-D13H) – serotonin 5-HT_{1B} and 5-HT_{7} receptor agonist, serotonin 5-HT_{1D} and 5-HT_{1F} receptor partial agonist, and serotonin 5-HT_{2A}, 5-HT_{2B}, and 5-HT_{2C} receptor antagonist – migraine

=== Phase 1 ===
- 2-Bromo-LSD (bromolysergide; BOL-148; NYPRG-101) – non-hallucinogenic serotonin 5-HT_{2A} receptor agonist and other actions – cluster headache, migraine
- JS-010 – monoclonal antibody against calcitonin gene-related peptide (CGRP) – migraine
- Meloxicam – COX inhibitor/NSAID – migraine

=== Preclinical ===
- 2-Bromo-LSD (bromolysergide; BOL-148; BETR-001, TD-0148A) – non-hallucinogenic serotonin 5-HT_{2A} receptor agonist and other actions – cluster headache
- GA-2601 – undefined mechanism of action – migraine
- MST-02 – undefined mechanism of action – migraine
- TACT908 – serotonin 5-HT_{1B} receptor agonist and non-hallucinogenic serotonin 5-HT_{2A} receptor partial agonist – cluster headache

=== Research ===
- Research programme: Neurological disorder therapeutics - Lario Therapeutics – undefined mechanism of action – migraine

=== Phase unknown ===
- AST-004 – adenosine A_{1} and A_{3} receptor agonist – migraine
- Propofol hemisuccinate (EP-102; EP-103) – GABA_{A} receptor positive allosteric modulator (propofol prodrug) – migraine
- Topiramate oral suspension – various actions – migraine

== Not under development ==
=== Preregistration submission withdrawal ===
- Frovatriptan (Allegro; Auradol; EN-3266; Frova; Isimig; Migard; Pitunal; Rilamig; SB-209509; SB-209509AX; VML-251) – serotonin 5-HT_{1B} and 5-HT_{1D} receptor agonist and triptan – menstrual migraine

=== Suspended ===
- Zolmitriptan transdermal (M-207; Qtrypta; triptan microneedle patch) – serotonin 5-HT_{1B} and 5-HT_{1D} receptor agonist and triptan – cluster headache, migraine

=== No development reported ===
- AF-130 – purinergic P2X3 receptor antagonist – migraine
- B-244 (AOB-101; AOB-102; AOB-103; AOB-201; AOB-202; AOB-203; B244; nitrosomonas eutropha D23) – bacteria replacement – migraine
- Carabersat (SB-204269) – undefined mechanism of action (anticonvulsant) – migraine
- CLE-500 – undefined mechanism of action – cluster headache
- CT-044 analogues - CERSCI Therapeutics – reactive oxygen species (ROS) inhibitor – migraine
- Cyclobenzaprine extended release (Amrix; Bonelax; EUR-1002) – tricyclic antidepressant (non-selective monoamine reuptake inhibitor and receptor modulator and other actions) – migraine
- Donepezil (Allydone; Aricept; E-2020; E-2022; Eranz) – acetylcholinesterase inhibitor – migraine
- Donitriptan mesilate (F-12640) – serotonin 5-HT_{1B} and 5-HT_{1D} receptor agonist and triptan – migraine
- Estetrol (E4; Donesta) – estrogen (estrogen receptor agonist) – migraine
- Filorexant (MK-6096) – orexin OX_{1} and OX_{2} receptor antagonist – migraine
- Flunarizine (XEN-007) – calcium channel blocker, non-selective monoamine receptor modulator, other actions – migraine
- Ibudilast (AV-411; Eyevinal; Ibinal; KC-404; Ketas; MN-166; Pinatos) – phosphodiesterase PDE4 inhibitor – headache
- IPX-232 – undefined mechanism of action – migraine
- Ketamine hydrochloride intranasal – ionotropic glutamate NMDA receptor antagonist and dissociative hallucinogen – cluster headache
- Ondansetron/rizatriptan – oral transmucosal film (rizatriptan/ondansetron; MSRX-202) – combination of ondansetron (serotonin 5-HT_{3} receptor antagonist and antiemetic) and rizatriptan (triptan)
- Oxytocin (TI-001; TI-114; TNX-1900; TNX-2900) – oxytocin receptor agonist – headache
- Piroxicam betadex (β-cyclodextrin piroxicam; Brexecam; Brexidol; Brexin; Brexine; Brexinil; CHF 1194; Cicladol; Cycladol; Flogene; piroxicam β-cyclodextrin) – COX inhibitor/NSAID – migraine, tension-type headache
- Psilocybin (low-dose psilocybin; BPL-PSILO) – non-selective serotonin receptor agonist and psychedelic hallucinogen – headache
- Psilocybin (MYCO-001; MYCO-003) – non-selective serotonin receptor agonist and psychedelic hallucinogen – headache
- Psilocybin (SYNP-101; synthetic psilocybin) – non-selective serotonin receptor agonist and psychedelic hallucinogen – cluster headache, migraine
- Relutrigine (PRAX-562) – sodium channel blocker – headache
- Research programme: calcitonin gene-related peptide receptor antagonists - Merck (CGRP receptor antagonists; Imidazoazepanes; MK-2918; MK-8825) – calcitonin gene-related peptide receptor (CGRPR) antagonists
- Research programme: GPCR modulators - Nxera Pharma – various actions
- Research programme: migraine and pain therapeutics - NeurAxon – various actions – migraine
- Research programme: pain and migraine therapy - OptiNose (OPT-1005) – undefined mechanism of action – migraine
- Rizatriptan intranasal – serotonin 5-HT_{1B} and 5-HT_{1D} receptor agonist and triptan – migraine
- Rizatriptan oral film – serotonin 5-HT_{1B} and 5-HT_{1D} receptor agonist and triptan – migraine
- Salubrin (PH80; PH-80; ORG-39479) – vomeropherine – migraine
- Sumatriptan (Imigran Nasal Spray; Imitrex Nasal Spray) – serotonin 5-HT_{1B} and 5-HT_{1D} receptor agonist and triptan – menstrual migraine
- Sumatriptan transmucosal (Omexa) – serotonin 5-HT_{1B} and 5-HT_{1D} receptor agonist and triptan – migraine
- Zucapsaicin (cis-capsaicin; Civamide; Civanex; Dolorac; Neuroderm; Zuacta) – transient receptor potential cation channel subfamily V member 1 (TRPV1) agonist – cluster headache, migraine

=== Discontinued ===
- Alniditan (R-91274) – serotonin 5-HT_{1B} and 5-HT_{1D} receptor agonist – migraine
- Avitriptan (BMS-180048) – serotonin 5-HT_{1B} and 5-HT_{1D} receptor agonist and triptan – migraine
- Bezisterim (HE-3286; NE-3107; Triolex; 17α-ethynyl-5-androstene-3β,7β,17β-triol) – undefined mechanism of action (synthetic androstenetriol analogue and anti-inflammatory) – migraine
- BI-44370 (BI44370) – calcitonin gene-related peptide receptor (CGRPR) antagonist – migraine
- Botulinum toxin A topical (RT-001) – acetylcholine release inhibitor and neuromuscular blocking agent – migraine
- Carisbamate (Comfyde; JNJ-10234094; RWJ-333369; YKP-509) – unknown mechanism of action – migraine
- Dasolampanel (NGX-426) – ionotropic glutamate AMPA and kainate receptor antagonist – migraine
- Dextromethorphan/quinidine (DXM/Q; AVP-923; Neurodex; Nuedexta; Zenvia) – combination of dextromethorphan (various actions) and quinidine (various actions) – migraine
- Dihydroergocryptine (SRN-001) – non-selective monoamine receptor modulator and ergoline – migraine
- Donitriptan (F-11356) – serotonin 5-HT_{1B} and 5-HT_{1D} receptor agonist and triptan – migraine
- Dotarizine (Dotaricin; FI-6026) – calcium channel blocker and serotonin 5-HT_{1A}, 5-HT_{2A}, and 5-HT_{2C} receptor antagonist – migraine
- Dronabinol (Δ^{9}-THC; Δ^{9}-tetrahydrocannabinol; Deltanyne; Elevat; Marinol) – cannabinoid CB_{1} and CB_{2} receptor agonist – migraine
- Ergotamine inhalation (Tempo-ergotamine) – non-selective monoamine receptor modulator and ergoline – migraine
- Esprolol ((S)-ACC-9369) – beta blocker (β-adrenergic receptor antagonist) (amoxolol prodrug) – migraine
- Ethinylestradiol/levonorgestrel (DP3; DR-103; DR-105; LoSeasonique; Seasonique) – combination of ethinylestradiol (an estrogen) and levonorgestrel (a progestogen) and a combined oral contraceptive – menstrual migraine
- (S)-Ethylisothiouronium diethylphosphate (Difetur; MTR-104; MTR-105; MTR-106; MTR-107; MTR-108; Raviclust; Ravimig; Raviten) – nitric oxide synthase (NOS) inhibitor
- Fremanezumab (Ajovy; LBR-101; PF-04427429; PF-4427429; RN-307; TEV-48125) – monoclonal antibody against calcitonin gene-related peptide (CGRP) – cluster headache, headache
- Gabapentin (CI-945; Gabapen; GOE-3450; Neurontin) – gabapentinoid (α_{2}δ subunit-containing voltage-gated calcium channel ligand) – migraine
- Gabapentin enacarbil (1838262; ASP8825; GSK-1838262; Horizant; Regnite; Solzira; XP13512) – gabapentinoid (α_{2}δ subunit-containing voltage-gated calcium channel ligand) – migraine
- Ganaxolone (CCD-1042; Ztalmy) – GABA_{A} receptor positive allosteric modulator and neurosteroid – migraine
- HTL-0022562 (BHV-3100; HTL-22562) – calcitonin gene-related peptide receptor (CGRPR) antagonist – migraine
- IS-159 – serotonin 5-HT_{1B} and 5-HT_{1D} receptor agonist – migraine
- Lacosamide (ADD-234037; Erlosamide; Harkoseride; SPM-927; SPM-929; Vimpat; Vimpato) – various actions – migraine
- Lanepitant (LY-303870) – neurokinin NK_{1} receptor antagonist – migraine
- Lidocaine transdermal patch (ADL-87223; LidoPAIN) – sodium channel blocker – headache
- Lornoxicam (Bosporon; Chlortenoxicam; HN-10000; RO-139297; Safem; TS-110; Xefo) – COX inhibitor/NSAID – migraine
- LY-2300559 – metabotropic glutamate receptor 2 (mGluR_{2}) positive allosteric modulator and cysteinyl leukotriene receptor 1 (CysLTR1) antagonist – migraine
- LY-334370 – serotonin 5-HT_{1F} receptor agonist and triptan – migraine
- MEDI-0618 – monoclonal antibody against protease-activated receptor 2 (PAR2) – migraine
- Olcegepant (BIBN-4096; BIBN-4096BS) – calcitonin gene-related peptide receptor (CGRPR) antagonist – migraine
- Oxytocin (TI-001; TI-114; TNX-1900; TNX-2900) – oxytocin receptor agonist – migraine
- Perampanel (E-2007; ER-155055-90; Fycompa) – AMPA receptor antagonist – migraine
- PF-5180999 (PF-05180999) – phosphodiesterase PDE2 inhibitor – migraine
- PNU-142633 (PNU-142633F) – serotonin 5-HT_{1D} receptor agonist – cluster headache, headache, migraine
- Prochlorperazine inhalation (AZ-001) – typical antipsychotic (non-selective monoamine receptor modulator) – migraine
- Propisergide (ergalgin) – serotonin receptor modulator and ergoline – migraine
- Propofol phosphate (Neuprox; propofol prodrug) – GABA_{A} receptor positive allosteric modulator (propofol prodrug) – migraine
- Research programme: migraine therapy - Orexo (OX-40; OX641) – undefined mechanism of action – migraine
- Selurampanel (BGG-492; BGG-492A) – ionotropic glutamate AMPA and kainate receptor antagonist – migraine
- Sergolexole (LY-281067) – serotonin 5-HT_{2} receptor antagonist and ergoline – migraine
- Telcagepant (MK-0974) – calcitonin gene-related peptide receptor (CGRPR) antagonist – migraine
- Tezampanel (LY-293558; NGX-424; PRN-001-01) – ionotropic glutamate AMPA and kainate receptor antagonist – migraine
- Tizanidine (AN-021A; AN-021; DS-103282; Sirdalud; Ternelin; Zanaflex) – α_{2}-adrenergic receptor agonist – migraine
- Tonabersat (SB-220453; USL-260; Xiflam) – connexin 43 (GJA1) inhibitor – migraine
- Zolmitriptan inhalation (CVT-427) – serotonin 5-HT_{1B} and 5-HT_{1D} receptor agonist and triptan – migraine
- Zonisamide (AD-810; CI-912; Excegran; Kinaplase; PD-110843; Tremode; Trerief; Zonegran) – calcium channel blocker, sodium channel blocker, and other actions – migraine

== Clinically used drugs ==
=== Approved drugs ===
==== COX inhibitors/NSAIDs ====
- Celecoxib (DFN-15; Elyxyb) – COX inhibitor/NSAID – migraine
- Dexibuprofen (Daxfen; DexOptifen; Movone; (S)-(+)-ibuprofen; Seractil; Ultraprofen) – COX inhibitor/NSAID – headache

==== Triptans (serotonin 5-HT_{1B} and 5-HT_{1D} receptor agonists) ====
- Almotriptan (Almogran; Axert; LAS-31416) – serotonin 5-HT_{1B} and 5-HT_{1D} receptor agonist and triptan – migraine
- Eletriptan (Relert; Relpax; UK-116044) – serotonin 5-HT_{1B} and 5-HT_{1D} receptor agonist and triptan – migraine, menstrual migraine
- Frovatriptan (Allegro; Auradol; EN-3266; Frova; Isimig; Migard; Pitunal; Rilamig; SB-209509; SB-209509AX; VML-251) – serotonin 5-HT_{1B} and 5-HT_{1D} receptor agonist and triptan – migraine
- Naratriptan (Amerge; GR-85548; GR-85548A; Naramig; SMP-948) – serotonin 5-HT_{1B} and 5-HT_{1D} receptor agonist and triptan – migraine
- Rizatriptan (L-705126; Maxalt; MK-0462; MK-462) – serotonin 5-HT_{1B} and 5-HT_{1D} receptor agonist and triptan – migraine
- Rizatriptan oral film (INT-0008; RHB-103; Rizafilm; VersaFilm; RizaPort) – serotonin 5-HT_{1B} and 5-HT_{1D} receptor agonist and triptan – migraine
- Sumatriptan (Imigran Nasal Spray; Imitrex Nasal Spray) – serotonin 5-HT_{1B} and 5-HT_{1D} receptor agonist and triptan – migraine
- Zolmitriptan (311-C90; 311C; AscoTop; BW-311C90; Zomig; Zomigon) – serotonin 5-HT_{1B} and 5-HT_{1D} receptor agonist and triptan – cluster headache, menstrual migraine, migraine
- Zolmitriptan oral dispersible film (zolmitriptan ODF; Zolmitriptan PharmaFilm; Zolmitriptan RapidFilm; Zolmitriptan Renantos Schmelzfilm) – serotonin 5-HT_{1B} and 5-HT_{1D} receptor agonist and triptan – migraine

==== Ergolines (non-selective monoamine receptor modulators) ====
- Dihydroergotamine (DHE; INP-104; POD-DHE; Trudhesa) – non-selective monoamine receptor modulator and ergoline – migraine
- Dihydroergotamine mesilate intranasal (Atzumi; STS-101; TO-2070) – non-selective monoamine receptor modulator and ergoline – migraine
- Dihydroergotamine mesylate intranasal (Migranal) – non-selective monoamine receptor modulator and ergoline – migraine

==== Calcitonin gene-related peptide (CGRP) inhibitors ====
- Atogepant (AGN-241689; Aquipta; MK-8031; Qulipta) – calcitonin gene-related peptide receptor (CGRPR) antagonist – migraine
- Eptinezumab (ALD-403; Lu-AG09221; Vyepti) – monoclonal antibody against calcitonin gene-related peptide (CGRP) – migraine
- Erenumab (Aimovig; AMG-334) – monoclonal antibody against calcitonin gene-related peptide receptor (CGRPR) – migraine
- Fremanezumab (Ajovy; LBR-101; PF-04427429; PF-4427429; RN-307; TEV-48125) – monoclonal antibody against calcitonin gene-related peptide (CGRP) – migraine
- Galcanezumab (Emgality; LY-2951742) – monoclonal antibody against calcitonin gene-related peptide (CGRP) – cluster headache, migraine
- Rimegepant (BHV-3000; BMS-927711; Nurtec; Vydura) – calcitonin gene-related peptide receptor (CGRPR) antagonist – migraine
- Ubrogepant (MK-1602; Ubrelvy) – calcitonin gene-related peptide receptor (CGRPR) antagonist – migraine
- Zavegepant (BHV-3500; BMS-742413; PF-07930207; Vazegepant; Zavzpret) – calcitonin gene-related peptide receptor (CGRPR) antagonist – migraine

==== Combination drugs ====
- Butalbital/acetaminophen (Butapap) – combination of butalbital (GABA_{A} receptor positive allosteric modulator and barbiturate) and acetaminophen (analgesic)
- Ergotamine/caffeine (Cafergot) – combination of ergotamine (non-selective monoamine receptor modulator and ergoline) and caffeine (adenosine receptor antagonist)
- Ergotamine/chlorcyclizine/caffeine (Anervan) – combination of ergotamine (non-selective monoamine receptor modulator and ergoline), chlorcyclizine (antihistamine and other actions), and caffeine (adenosine receptor antagonist)
- Meloxicam/rizatriptan (AXS-07; Symbravo) – combination of meloxicam (COX inhibitor/NSAID) and rizatriptan (triptan)
- Naproxen sodium/sumatriptan (MT-400; SumaRT/Nap; Suvexx; Trexima; Treximet) – combination of naproxen (COX inhibitor/NSAID) and sumatriptan (triptan) – migraine
- Paracetamol/codeine/buclizine (Migraleve Yellow) – combination of paracetamol (analgesic) and codeine (opioid)
- Paracetamol/codeine/buclizine (Migraleve Pink) – combination of paracetamol (analgesic), codeine (opioid), and buclizine (antihistamine and other actions)
- Paracetamol/dichloralphenazone/isometheptene (Amidrine) – combination of paracetamol (analgesic), dichloralphenazone (phenazone (COX inhibitor/NSAID) and chloral hydrate (GABA_{A} receptor positive allosteric modulator)), and isometheptene (adrenergic receptor agonist)
- Paracetamol/metoclopramide (Paramax) – combination of paracetamol (analgesic) and metoclopramide (various actions)
- Sumatriptan/naproxen (Treximet) – combination of sumatriptan (triptan) and naproxen (COX inhibitor/NSAID)

==== Other drugs ====
- Alpiropride (Revistel, Rivistel, Rivestel) – dopamine D_{2} receptor antagonist – migraine
- Dimetotiazine (Banistyl, Normelin) – non-selective monoamine receptor modulator – migraine
- Flumedroxone acetate (Demigran, Leomigran) – progestogen (progesterone receptor agonist) – migraine
- Iprazochrome (Divascan) – serotonin receptor antagonist – migraine
- Lasmiditan (COL-144; LY-573144; Rayvow; Reyvow) – serotonin 5-HT_{1F} receptor agonist – migraine
- Lomerizine (DE-090; KB-2796; Migsis) – non-selective monoamine receptor modulator, other actions – migraine
- Onabotulinum toxin A (BoNTA; Botox; GSK-1358820; OnabotA X; Vistabel; Vistabex) – acetylcholine release inhibitor and neuromuscular blocking agent – migraine
- Oxetorone (Nocertone, Oxedix) – non-selective monoamine receptor modulator – migraine
- Topiramate (Epitomax; KW-6485; MCN-4853; RWJ-17021; Topamax; Topimax; Topina) – various actions – migraine
- Topiramate oral (Eprontia; ET-101) – various actions – migraine
- Topiramate extended-release (SPN-538; TPM XR; Trokendi XR; Trokesa) – various actions – migraine
- Valproate semisodium (Depakote; Divalproex; Divalproex sodium; Epival; LA40220) – various actions – migraine

=== Off-label drugs ===
- α_{2}-Adrenergic receptor agonists (e.g., clonidine, tizanidine)
- Acetaminophen (paracetamol)
- Adenosine receptor antagonists (e.g., caffeine)
- Angiotensin-converting-enzyme inhibitors (ACE inhibitors) (e.g., lisinopril)
- Angiotensin receptor antagonists (e.g., candesartan, telmisartan)
- Antipsychotics and related (e.g., prochlorperazine, metoclopramide, haloperidol, promethazine, chlorpromazine)
- Anticonvulsants (e.g., valproic acid)
- Barbiturates (e.g., butalbital, proxibarbital)
- Beta blockers (β-adrenergic receptor antagonists) (e.g., propranolol, metoprolol, nadolol, timolol, atenolol)
- Calcium channel blockers (e.g., verapamil, nimodipine, nifedipine, diltiazem)
- Cannabinoids (cannabinoid receptor agonists) (e.g., cannabis, tetrahydrocannabinol (THC))
- Corticosteroids (e.g., dexamethasone, prednisone)
- Ergoline monoamine receptor modulators (e.g., ergotamine, methylergometrine, methysergide, dihydroergocryptine, bromocriptine, lisuride)
- Estrogens (estrogen receptor agonists) (e.g., estradiol, ethinylestradiol)
- Gabapentinoids (α_{2}δ subunit-containing volate-gated calcium channel ligands) (e.g., gabapentin, pregabalin)
- Melatonin
- Nonsteroidal anti-inflammatory drugs (NSAIDs; COX inhibitors) (e.g., ibuprofen, aspirin, naproxen, diclofenac, ketorolac, ketoprofen)
- Opioids (μ-opioid receptor agonists) (e.g., morphine, codeine, oxycodone, hydrocodone)
- Progestogens (progesterone receptor agonists) (e.g., progesterone, medroxyprogesterone acetate)
- Propofol
- Serotonergic psychedelics (e.g., psilocybin, lysergic acid diethylamide (LSD), dimethyltryptamine (DMT))
- Serotonin receptor antagonists (e.g., methysergide, pizotifen, cyproheptadine)
- Sodium channel blockers (e.g., lidocaine)
- Tetracyclic antidepressants (TeCAs) (e.g., mianserin, mirtazapine)
- Tricyclic antidepressants (TCAs) (e.g., amitriptyline, nortriptyline, imipramine)

== See also ==
- List of investigational drugs
- Antimigraine drug
- Management of migraine
