= Decahydroisoquinoline =

Names
- IUPAC name 1,2,3,4,4a,5,6,7,8,8a-Decahydroisoquinoline
- Other names Perhydroisoquinoline

Identifiers
CAS Number	6329-61-9
3D model (JSmol)	Interactive image
ChemSpider	88287
ECHA InfoCard	100.026.093
EC Number	228-702-4
PubChem CID	97812
CompTox Dashboard (EPA)	DTXSID80902755
- InChI: InChI=1S/C9H17N/c1-2-4-9-7-10-6-5-8(9)3-1/h8-10H,1-7H2 Key: NENLYAQPNATJSU-UHFFFAOYSA-N
- SMILES: C1CCC2CNCCC2C1

Properties
Chemical formula	C_{9}H_{17}N
Molar mass	139.242 g·mol^{−1}

Hazards
- GHS labelling
Pictograms	(GHS07: Exclamation mark)
Signal word	Warning
Hazard statements	H315, H319, H335
Precautionary statements	P261, P264, P271, P280, P302+P352, P304+P340, P305+P351+P338, P312, P321, P332+P313, P337+P313, P362, P403+P233, P405, P501
- Except where otherwise noted, data are given for materials in their standard state (at 25 °C [77 °F], 100 kPa). Infobox references

Decahydroisoquinoline is a nitrogen-containing heterocycle with the chemical formula C_{9}H_{17}N. It is the saturated form of isoquinoline.

Decahydroisoquinoline can be formed by the hydrogenation of isoquinoline or tetrahydroisoquinoline.

== Isomers ==
There are four stereoisomers of decahydroisoquinoline which differ by the configuration of the two carbon atoms at the ring fusion:

(4aR,8aR)‐cis-decahydroisoquinoline

(4aS,8aS)‐cis-decahydroisoquinoline

(4aR,8aS)‐trans-decahydroisoquinoline

(4aS,8aR)‐trans-decahydroisoquinoline

== Occurrence ==
The decahydroisoquinoline occurs naturally in some alkaloids, including gephyrotoxins and pumiliotoxin C which are found in amphibian skins.

A variety of pharmaceutical drugs include a decahydroisoquinoline ring system within their structure, including ciprefadol, dasolampanel, nelfinavir, saquinavir, and tezampanel.
