= Relutrigine =

Clinical data
- Other names: PRAX-562; PRAX562
- Routes of administration: Oral
- Drug class: Sodium channel blocker; Anticonvulsant

Identifiers
- IUPAC name: 3-[ethoxy(difluoro)methyl]-6-[5-fluoro-6-(2,2,2-trifluoroethoxy)-3-pyridinyl]-[1,2,4]triazolo[4,3-a]pyrazine
- CAS Number: 2392951-29-8
- PubChem CID: 147075611
- DrugBank: DB21614
- ChemSpider: 115277038
- UNII: AW5C5XHM4W
- ChEMBL: ChEMBL5314479

Chemical and physical data
- Formula: C_{15}H_{11}F_{6}N_{5}O_{2}
- Molar mass: 407.276 g·mol^{−1}
- 3D model (JSmol): Interactive image
- SMILES: CCOC(C1=NN=C2N1C=C(N=C2)C3=CC(=C(N=C3)OCC(F)(F)F)F)(F)F
- InChI: InChI=1S/C15H11F6N5O2/c1-2-28-15(20,21)13-25-24-11-5-22-10(6-26(11)13)8-3-9(16)12(23-4-8)27-7-14(17,18)19/h3-6H,2,7H2,1H3; Key:BFXBSYMVTNEFRF-UHFFFAOYSA-N

Relutrigine (INN; developmental code name PRAX-562) is a persistent neuronal sodium channel blocker which is under development for the treatment of epilepsy and headache. It is taken orally. The drug shows anticonvulsant effects in animals but with improved tolerability compared to existing sodium channel blockers. Relutrigine is under development by Praxis Precision Medicines. As of May 2026, it is in preregistration for epilepsy. Conversely, no recent development has been reported for headaches.

== See also ==
- List of investigational headache and migraine drugs
