= Paramax (disambiguation) =

Paramax is the trade name for Paracetamol/metoclopramide.

Paramax may also refer to:

- A business unit of L-3 Communications
- An Amiga video game
