= C9H17N =

The molecular formula C_{9}H_{17}N (molar mass: 139.24 g/mol, exact mass: 139.1361 u) may refer to:

- Azaspirodecane
- Decahydroisoquinoline
- Quinolizidine (norlupinane, octahydro-2H-quinolizine)
