= C19H29NO =

The molecular formula C_{19}H_{29}NO (molar mass: 287.44 g/mol, exact mass: 287.2249 u) may refer to:

- Cycrimine
- Gephyrotoxin, also known as Histrionicotoxin D
