= Dasolampanel =

Chemical compound

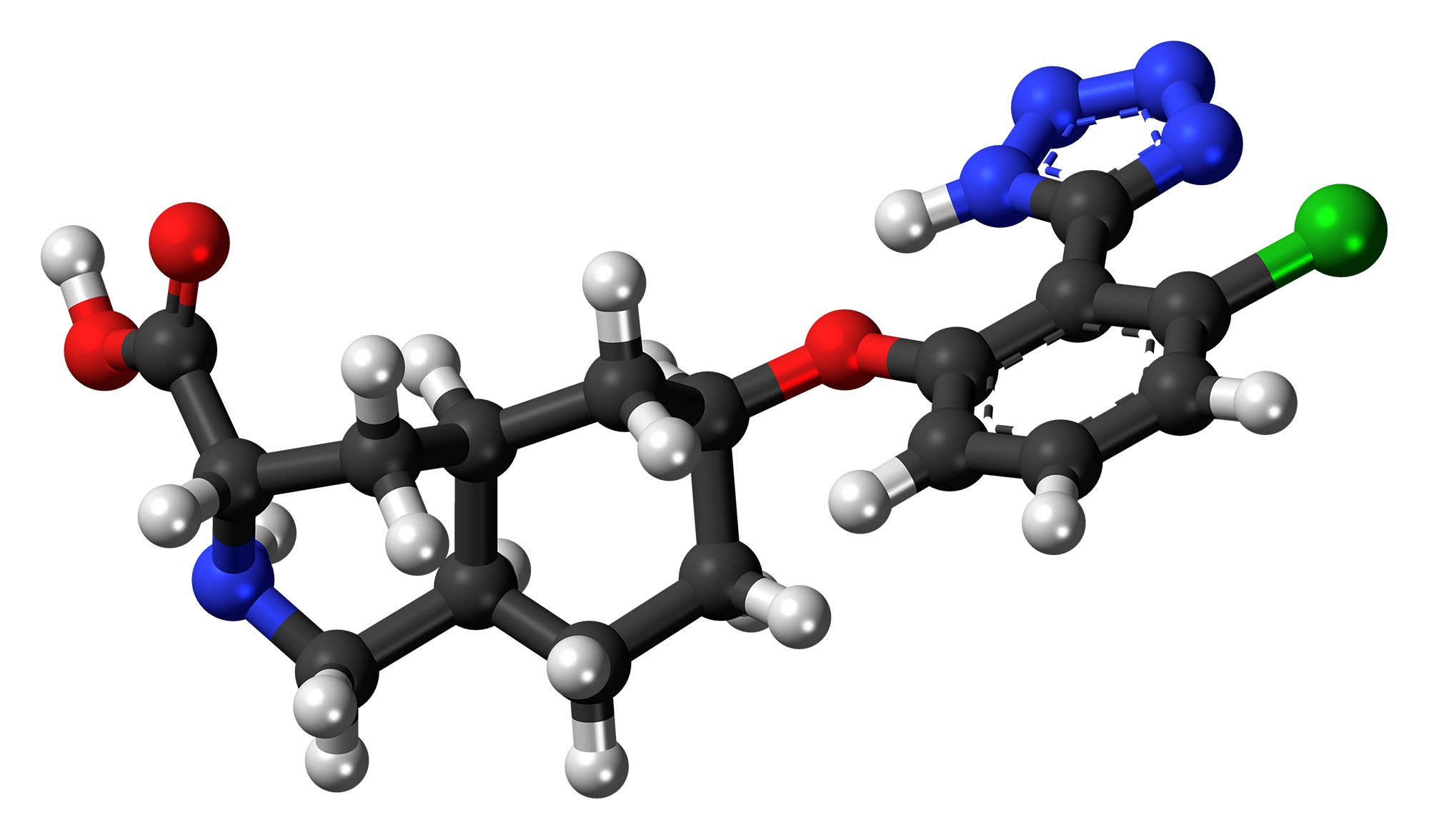

Clinical data
- ATC code: None

Identifiers
- IUPAC name: (3S,4aS,6S,8aR)-6-(3-Chloro-2-(1H-tetrazol-5-yl)phenoxy)decahydroisoquinoline-3-carboxylic acid
- CAS Number: 503294-13-1
- PubChem CID: 51049972
- ChemSpider: 25948207
- UNII: 1P85D6BE9K
- KEGG: D10107
- CompTox Dashboard (EPA): DTXSID401032046

Chemical and physical data
- Formula: C_{17}H_{20}ClN_{5}O_{3}
- Molar mass: 377.83 g·mol^{−1}
- 3D model (JSmol): Interactive image
- SMILES: c1cc(c(c(c1)Cl)c2[nH]nnn2)O[C@H]3CC[C@H]4CN[C@@H](C[C@H]4C3)C(=O)O
- InChI: InChI=1S/C17H20ClN5O3/c18-12-2-1-3-14(15(12)16-20-22-23-21-16)26-11-5-4-9-8-19-13(17(24)25)7-10(9)6-11/h1-3,9-11,13,19H,4-8H2,(H,24,25)(H,20,21,22,23)/t9-,10+,11-,13-/m0/s1; Key:LAKQPSQCICNZII-NOHGZBONSA-N

Dasolampanel (INN, USAN, code name NGX-426) is an orally bioavailable analog of tezampanel and thereby competitive antagonist of the AMPA and kainate receptors which was under development by Raptor Pharmaceuticals/Torrey Pines Therapeutics for the treatment of chronic pain conditions including neuropathic pain and migraine. It was developed as a follow-on compound to tezampanel, as tezampanel is not bioavailable orally and must be administered by intravenous injection, but ultimately neither drug was ever marketed.

== See also ==
- Irampanel
- Selurampanel
