= AGX-201 =

Clinical data
- Other names: AGX201; Histamine dihydrochloride; 2-(4-Imidazolyl)ethylamine dihydrochloride
- Routes of administration: Subcutaneous injection
- Drug class: Histamine receptor modulator; Histamine H_{1} receptor antagonist; Histamine H_{3} receptor agonist; Antimigraine agent

Pharmacokinetic data
- Elimination half-life: 14–61 minutes

Identifiers
- IUPAC name: 2-(1H-imidazol-5-yl)ethanamine;dihydrochloride
- CAS Number: 56-92-8
- PubChem CID: 5818
- ChemSpider: 5613
- UNII: 3POA0Q644U
- KEGG: D04444
- ChEMBL: ChEMBL1533310

Chemical and physical data
- Formula: C_{5}H_{11}Cl_{2}N_{3}
- Molar mass: 184.06 g·mol^{−1}
- 3D model (JSmol): Interactive image
- SMILES: C1=C(NC=N1)CCN.Cl.Cl
- InChI: InChI=1S/C5H9N3.2ClH/c6-2-1-5-3-7-4-8-5;;/h3-4H,1-2,6H2,(H,7,8);2*1H; Key:PPZMYIBUHIPZOS-UHFFFAOYSA-N

AGX-201, also known as histamine dihydrochloride, is a histamine receptor modulator which is under development for the treatment of migraine. It is or was also under development for a variety of other indications. The drug is given by subcutaneous injection.

It is the dihydrochloride salt of histamine. However, whereas histamine is said to efficiently induce migraine in people with migraine most likely via histamine H_{1} and H_{3} receptors, AGX-201 is said to act as an antagonist of the H_{1} receptor and as an agonist of the H_{3} receptor. This in turn is said to produce antimigraine effects by reducing the release of pro-inflammatory mediators in trigeminal nerve endings and hence via anti-inflammatory effects. The drug is also specifically said to modulate histamine receptors on mast cells to make them more resilient to degranulation as part of its antimigraine activity. The exact mechanism of action of AGX-201 in terms of its antimigraine effects is unknown however. The elimination half-life of histamine dihydrochloride by subcutaneous injection in humans is 14 to 61 minutes.

AGX-201 is under development by AgoneX Biopharmaceuticals. As of August 2024, it is in phase 2 clinical trials for this indication. The drug is or was also under development for the treatment of amyotrophic lateral sclerosis (ALS), attention deficit hyperactivity disorder (ADHD), autistic disorder, epilepsy, multiple sclerosis, neurodegenerative disorders, Parkinson's disease, and schizophrenia, but no recent development has been reported for these indications.

== See also ==
- List of investigational headache and migraine drugs
