= Talampanel =

Chemical compound

Clinical data
- ATC code: none

Legal status
- Legal status: Investigational

Identifiers
- IUPAC name: (8R)-7-Acetyl-5-(4-aminophenyl)-8,9-dihydro-8-methyl-7H-1,3-dioxolo[4,5-h][2,3]benzodiazepine
- CAS Number: 161832-65-1
- PubChem CID: 164509
- ChemSpider: 144217
- UNII: CVS43XG1L5
- ChEMBL: ChEMBL61872
- CompTox Dashboard (EPA): DTXSID10167259
- ECHA InfoCard: 100.230.001

Chemical and physical data
- Formula: C_{19}H_{19}N_{3}O_{3}
- Molar mass: 337.379 g·mol^{−1}
- 3D model (JSmol): Interactive image
- SMILES: Nc4ccc(cc4)C(=NN2C(=O)C)c3cc1OCOc1cc3CC2C
- InChI: InChI=1S/C19H19N3O3/c1-11-7-14-8-17-18(25-10-24-17)9-16(14)19(21-22(11)12(2)23)13-3-5-15(20)6-4-13/h3-6,8-9,11H,7,10,20H2,1-2H3/t11-/m1/s1; Key:JACAAXNEHGBPOQ-LLVKDONJSA-N

Talampanel (INN; development codes GYKI 537773 and LY300164) is a drug which has been investigated for the treatment of epilepsy, malignant gliomas, and amyotrophic lateral sclerosis (ALS).

As of May 2010, results from the trial for ALS have been found negative. Talampanel is not currently under development.

Talampanel acts as a non-competitive antagonist of the AMPA receptor, a type of ionotropic glutamate receptor in the central nervous system.

It showed effectiveness for epilepsy in clinical trials but its development was suspended due to its poor pharmacokinetic profile, namely a short terminal half-life (3 hours) that necessitated multiple doses per day.

== See also ==
- GYKI-52895
