= Lufuradom =

Chemical compound

Clinical data
- ATC code: None

Identifiers
- IUPAC name: N-[(8-fluoro-1-methyl-5-phenyl-2,3-dihydro-1H-1,4-benzodiazepin-2-yl)methyl]-3-furamide
- CAS Number: 85118-42-9
- PubChem CID: 3045400
- ChemSpider: 2308141
- UNII: GS8D070P7W
- CompTox Dashboard (EPA): DTXSID50868859

Chemical and physical data
- Formula: C_{22}H_{20}FN_{3}O_{2}
- Molar mass: 377.419 g·mol^{−1}
- 3D model (JSmol): Interactive image
- SMILES: O=C(C1=COC=C1)NCC2N(C)C3=C(C(C4=CC=CC=C4)=NC2)C=CC(F)=C3
- InChI: InChI=1S/C22H20FN3O2/c1-26-18(13-25-22(27)16-9-10-28-14-16)12-24-21(15-5-3-2-4-6-15)19-8-7-17(23)11-20(19)26/h2-11,14,18H,12-13H2,1H3,(H,25,27); Key:QJSCDZOUCFWCKD-UHFFFAOYSA-N

Lufuradom (INN) is a drug and benzodiazepine derivative which, unlike other benzodiazepines, is described as an analgesic. Similarly to its analogue tifluadom, it was never marketed.

== See also ==
- Tifluadom
- GYKI-52895, structural benzodiazepine which is a dopamine reuptake inhibitor without GABAergic function
- GYKI-52,466, structural benzodiazepine which is an AMPAkine and glutamate antagonist without GABAergic function
