= Paracetamol/metoclopramide =

Oral fixed dose combination prescription medication

Combination of
- Paracetamol: Analgesic
- Metoclopramide: Dopamine antagonist

Clinical data
- Routes of administration: Oral

Legal status
- Legal status: AU: S3 (Pharmacist only); UK: POM (Prescription only); OTC (CH)

Identifiers
- CAS Number: 73802-00-3

Paracetamol/metoclopramide hydrochloride is an oral fixed dose combination prescription medication containing the analgesic paracetamol (500 mg) and the anti-emetic metoclopramide hydrochloride (5 mg). Formulated as a tablet and as sachets of a water-soluble powder, it is sold under the trade name Paramax by Sanofi-Synthelabo, and in Switzerland as Migraeflux MCP, in Australia it is sold as Meteclomax and Anagraine.

The combination is used to treat the symptoms of migraine, both to relieve headache (the analgesic) and to treat associated nausea and vomiting (the antiemetic). In addition to its direct anti-emetic effect metoclopramide also stimulates gastric emptying (prokinetic), which is often delayed during migraine attacks, and accelerates the absorption of paracetamol. However the improvement in paracetamol absorption has been questioned.

The combination of metoclopramide to the paracetamol has been shown to enhance the analgesia relief when used to treat the pain of arthritis.

Whilst the individual component drugs may be prescribed individually, as a combination, it is only available as the branded Paramax preparation in the UK. In the UK there are only two other combination analgesics with antiemetics (i.e., anti-nausea) products available: MigraMax (aspirin with metoclopramide) and the over-the-counter drug Migraleve (paracetamol and codeine for analgesia, with buclizine as the antiemetic). The role for these products is between just the use of simple analgesics (paracetamol or ibuprofen) and the triptan class of drugs; although the latter are not options during pregnancy. In the elderly although triptans are generally avoided, so too are antiemetics such as metoclopramide due to higher risks of side effects. In Australia and New Zealand, the combination is available without prescription from pharmacies.
