= Esprolol =

Clinical data
- Other names: (S)-ACC-9369; (S)-ACC9369
- Routes of administration: Sublingual
- Drug class: Beta blocker; β_{1}-Adrenergic receptor antagonist
- ATC code: None

Pharmacokinetic data
- Metabolism: Esterases
- Metabolites: Amoxolol
- Onset of action: "Rapid"
- Duration of action: "Short"

Identifiers
- IUPAC name: ethyl 3-[2-[(2S)-2-hydroxy-3-(propan-2-ylamino)propoxy]phenyl]propanoate
- CAS Number: 396654-09-4 112805-65-9 (hydrochloride)
- PubChem CID: 9950099
- ChemSpider: 8125710
- UNII: 50PY5PGT61

Chemical and physical data
- Formula: C_{17}H_{27}NO_{4}
- Molar mass: 309.406 g·mol^{−1}
- 3D model (JSmol): Interactive image
- SMILES: CCOC(=O)CCC1=CC=CC=C1OC[C@H](CNC(C)C)O
- InChI: InChI=1S/C17H27NO4/c1-4-21-17(20)10-9-14-7-5-6-8-16(14)22-12-15(19)11-18-13(2)3/h5-8,13,15,18-19H,4,9-12H2,1-3H3/t15-/m0/s1; Key:DMLSVZSUDBKLED-HNNXBMFYSA-N

Esprolol, also known as (S)-ACC-9369, is a beta blocker which was under development for the treatment of angina pectoris, anxiety disorders, and migraine. It is taken sublingually and has a rapid onset of action, short time to peak, and short duration. The drug is a prodrug of amoxolol, which is formed from esprolol via esterase enzymes. It is a selective β_{1}-adrenergic receptor antagonist. Esprolol was under development by Selectus Pharmaceuticals. It reached phase 2 clinical trials for all indications prior to the discontinuation of its development in 2001.

== See also ==
- List of investigational anxiety disorder drugs
- List of investigational headache and migraine drugs
