= GYKI 52466 =

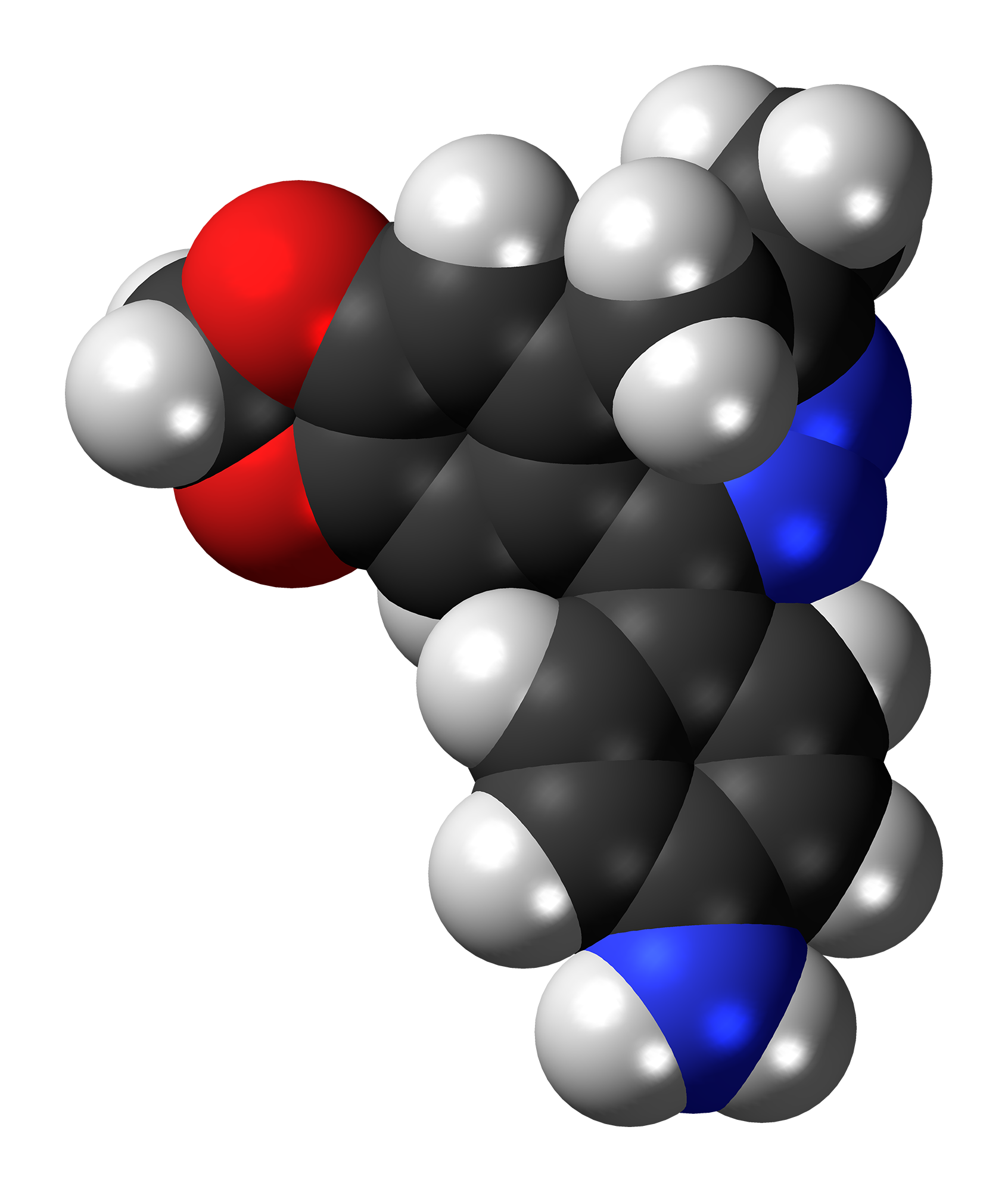

Names
- Preferred IUPAC name 4-(8-Methyl-2H,9H-[1,3]dioxolo[4,5-h][2,3]benzodiazepin-5-yl)aniline

Identifiers
CAS Number	102771-26-6; 192065-56-8 (HCl salt)
3D model (JSmol)	Interactive image
ChEBI	CHEBI:79560
ChEMBL	ChEMBL275006
ChemSpider	3417
ECHA InfoCard	100.162.378
IUPHAR/BPS	4210
KEGG	C15040
PubChem CID	3538
UNII	471V8NZ5X3
CompTox Dashboard (EPA)	DTXSID40145500
- InChI: InChI=1S/C17H15N3O2/c1-10-6-12-7-15-16(22-9-21-15)8-14(12)17(20-19-10)11-2-4-13(18)5-3-11/h2-5,7-8H,6,9,18H2,1H3 Key: LFBZZHVSGAHQPP-UHFFFAOYSA-N; InChI=1/C17H15N3O2/c1-10-6-12-7-15-16(22-9-21-15)8-14(12)17(20-19-10)11-2-4-13(18)5-3-11/h2-5,7-8H,6,9,18H2,1H3 Key: LFBZZHVSGAHQPP-UHFFFAOYAH
- SMILES: CC1=NN=C(C2=CC3=C(C=C2C1)OCO3)C4=CC=C(C=C4)N

Properties
Chemical formula	C_{17}H_{15}N_{3}O_{2}
Molar mass	293.326 g·mol^{−1}
Appearance	Yellow solid (HCl salt)
Density	1.393 g/cm^{3}
Solubility in water	>10 mg/mL (HCl salt)
- Except where otherwise noted, data are given for materials in their standard state (at 25 °C [77 °F], 100 kPa). verify (what is ?) Infobox references

GYKI 52466 is a 2,3-benzodiazepine that acts as an ionotropic glutamate receptor antagonist, which is a non-competitive AMPA receptor antagonist (IC_{50} values are 10-20, ~ 450 and >> 50 μM for AMPA-, kainate- and NMDA-induced responses respectively), orally-active anticonvulsant, and skeletal muscle relaxant. Unlike conventional 1,4-benzodiazepines, GYKI 52466 and related 2,3-benzodiazepines do not act on GABA_{A} receptors. Like other AMPA receptor antagonists, GYKI 52466 has anticonvulsant and neuroprotective properties.

CNS review:

== See also ==
- GYKI 52895, another 2,3-benzodiazepine with other than GABAergic function
- Tifluadom
- Lufuradom
