= Tifluadom =

Pair of enantiomers

Clinical data
- Routes of administration: unknown
- ATC code: none

Identifiers
- IUPAC name: N-[[5-(2-Fluorophenyl)-1-methyl-2,3-dihydro-1,4-benzodiazepin-2-yl]methyl]thiophene-3-carboxamide
- CAS Number: 83386-35-0
- PubChem CID: 115208
- IUPHAR/BPS: 1667
- ChemSpider: 103084
- UNII: TF8X866L0I
- KEGG: D02694
- ChEMBL: ChEMBL169703
- CompTox Dashboard (EPA): DTXSID40868621
- ECHA InfoCard: 100.073.052

Chemical and physical data
- Formula: C_{22}H_{20}FN_{3}OS
- Molar mass: 393.48 g·mol^{−1}
- 3D model (JSmol): Interactive image
- SMILES: O=C(NCC1N(c3ccccc3C(=N/C1)\c2ccccc2F)C)c4ccsc4
- InChI: InChI=1S/C22H20FN3OS/c1-26-16(13-25-22(27)15-10-11-28-14-15)12-24-21(17-6-2-4-8-19(17)23)18-7-3-5-9-20(18)26/h2-11,14,16H,12-13H2,1H3,(H,25,27); Key:NPGABYHTDVGGJK-UHFFFAOYSA-N

Tifluadom is a benzodiazepine derivative with an unusual activity profile. Unlike most benzodiazepines, tifluadom has no activity at the GABA_{A} receptor, but instead is a selective agonist for the κ-opioid receptor. It has potent analgesic and diuretic effects in animals, and also has sedative effects and stimulates appetite.

While tifluadom has several effects which might have potential uses in medicine, such as analgesia and appetite stimulation, κ-opioid agonists tend to produce undesirable effects in humans such as dysphoria and hallucinations, and so these drugs tend to only be used in scientific research. Dysphoric effects are similar to those seen when using other κ-opioid receptor agonists like pentazocine and salvinorin A, and can be considered the opposite of morphine-induced euphoria. As such, kappa agonists are believed to have very limited abuse potential.

== See also ==
- Lufuradom
- GYKI-52895, a benzodiazepine which is a dopamine reuptake inhibitor without GABAergic function
- GYKI-52,466, a benzodiazepine which is a glutamate antagonist without GABAergic function
