= GYKI-52895 =

Chemical compound

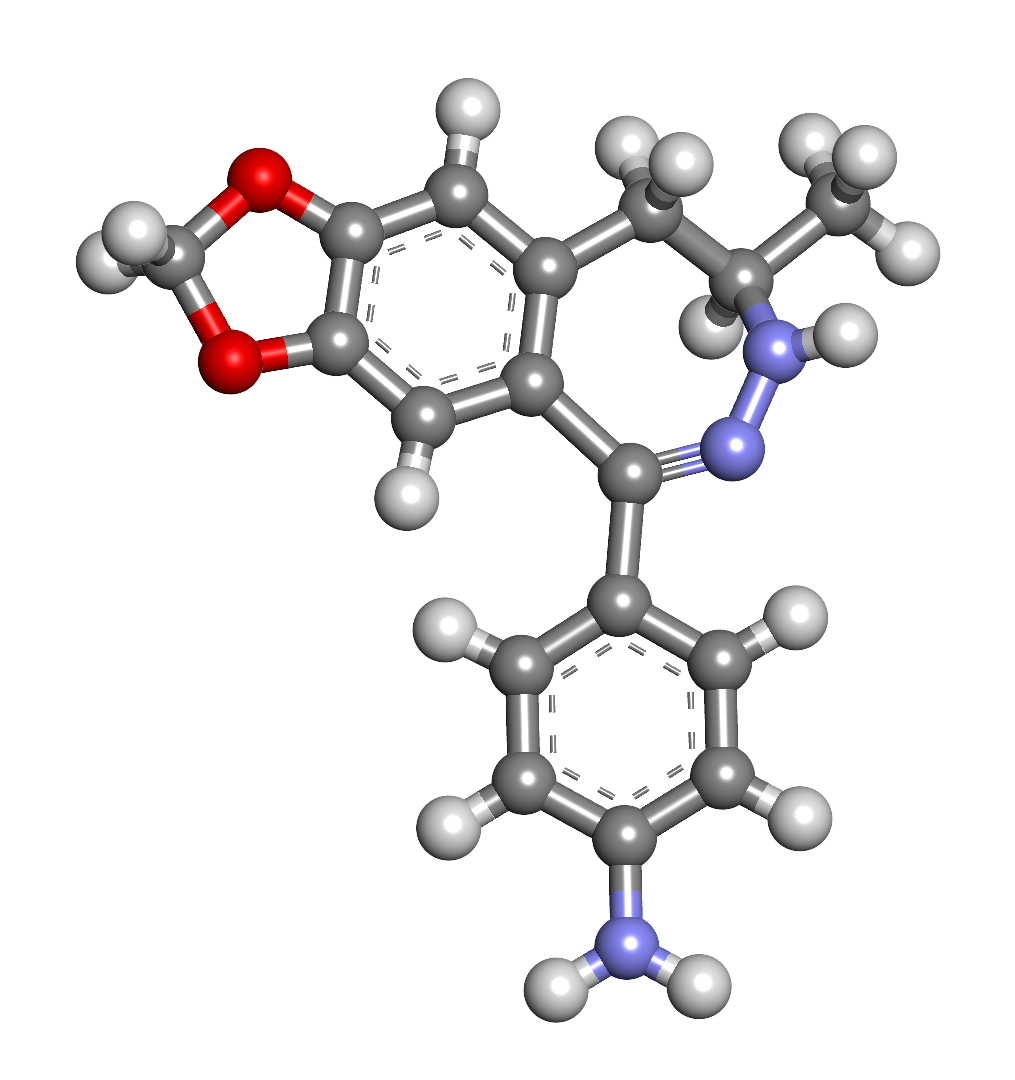

Clinical data
- Other names: GYKI52895; 4-(8,9-Dihydro-8-methyl-7H-1,3-dioxolo[4,5-h][2,3]benzodiazepin-5-yl)benzenamine

Identifiers
- IUPAC name: 4-{13-methyl-4,6-dioxa-11,12-diazatricyclo[7.5.0.0^{3,7}]tetradeca-1,3(7),8,10-tetraen-10-yl}aniline
- CAS Number: 869360-93-0
- PubChem CID: 3539
- ChemSpider: 3418
- UNII: H7KSE29GCH
- KEGG: C15094
- ChEMBL: ChEMBL1256984
- CompTox Dashboard (EPA): DTXSID80921385

Chemical and physical data
- Formula: C_{17}H_{17}N_{3}O_{2}
- Molar mass: 295.342 g·mol^{−1}
- 3D model (JSmol): Interactive image
- SMILES: O1c2c(OC1)cc3c(c2)C(=N/NC(C3)C)\c4ccc(N)cc4
- InChI: InChI=1S/C17H17N3O2/c1-10-6-12-7-15-16(22-9-21-15)8-14(12)17(20-19-10)11-2-4-13(18)5-3-11/h2-5,7-8,10,19H,6,9,18H2,1H3; Key:AQTITSBNGSVQNZ-UHFFFAOYSA-N

GYKI-52895 is a drug which is a 2,3-benzodiazepine derivative that also shares the 3,4-methylenedioxyamphetamine pharmacophore. Unlike other similar drugs, GYKI 52895 is a selective dopamine reuptake inhibitor (DRI), which appears to have an atypical mode of action compared to other DRIs. Its DRI activity is shared by numerous addictive drugs including amphetamine and its derivatives (e.g. dextromethamphetamine), cocaine, and methylphenidate and its derivatives (e.g. ethylphenidate). However, dopaminergic drugs are also prone to producing emetic effects such as in the case of apomorphine.

Egis Pharmaceuticals began clinical development of the drug in 1997 for major depressive disorder and Parkinson's disease, but it was discontinued in 2001.

== See also ==
- List of investigational Parkinson's disease drugs
- List of investigational antidepressants
- Talampanel
- GYKI 52466, another 2,3-benzodiazepine with other than GABAergic function
- Tifluadom
- Lufuradom
- Benzodiazepine
- Substituted methylenedioxyphenethylamine
