= Chloral betaine =

Chemical compound

Clinical data
- Routes of administration: Oral
- ATC code: None

Legal status
- Legal status: US: Schedule IV

Identifiers
- IUPAC name: 2,2,2-Trichloro-1,1-ethanediol : (trimethylammonio)acetate (1:1)
- CAS Number: 2218-68-0
- PubChem CID: 16676
- DrugBank: DB01494
- ChemSpider: 15813
- UNII: 8680278NRH
- CompTox Dashboard (EPA): DTXSID20176716
- ECHA InfoCard: 100.017.021

Chemical and physical data
- Formula: C_{7}H_{14}Cl_{3}NO_{4}
- Molar mass: 282.54 g·mol^{−1}
- 3D model (JSmol): Interactive image
- SMILES: C[N+](C)(C)CC(=O)[O-].C(C(Cl)(Cl)Cl)(O)O
- InChI: InChI=1S/C5H11NO2.C2H3Cl3O2/c1-6(2,3)4-5(7)8;3-2(4,5)1(6)7/h4H2,1-3H3;1,6-7H; Key:ONAOIDNSINNZOA-UHFFFAOYSA-N

Chloral betaine (USAN, BAN) (brand names Beta-Chlor, Somilan), also known as cloral betaine (INN), is a sedative-hypnotic drug. It was introduced by Mead Johnson in the United States in 1963. It is a betaine complex of trimethylglycine with chloral hydrate, which acts as an extended-acting formulation of chloral hydrate which is then metabolized into trichloroethanol, which is responsible for most or all of its effects.

== See also ==
- Dichloralphenazone
