= Osavampator =

Experimental antidepressant

Clinical data
- Other names: TAK-653; TAK653; NBI-1065845; NBI-845

Legal status
- Legal status: Investigational

Pharmacokinetic data
- Elimination half-life: 33.1–47.8 hours

Identifiers
- IUPAC name: 9-(4-cyclohexyloxyphenyl)-7-methyl-3,4-dihydropyrazino[2,1-c][1,2,4]thiadiazine 2,2-dioxide
- CAS Number: 1358751-06-0
- PubChem CID: 56655833
- DrugBank: DB16304
- ChemSpider: 81367230
- UNII: 9E3TOE5RIZ
- KEGG: D13050
- ChEMBL: ChEMBL4594403

Chemical and physical data
- Formula: C_{19}H_{23}N_{3}O_{3}S
- Molar mass: 373.47 g·mol^{−1}
- 3D model (JSmol): Interactive image
- SMILES: CC1=CN2CCS(=O)(=O)N=C2C(=N1)C3=CC=C(C=C3)OC4CCCCC4
- InChI: InChI=1S/C19H23N3O3S/c1-14-13-22-11-12-26(23,24)21-19(22)18(20-14)15-7-9-17(10-8-15)25-16-5-3-2-4-6-16/h7-10,13,16H,2-6,11-12H2,1H3; Key:PXJBHEHFVQVDDS-UHFFFAOYSA-N

Osavampator (developmental code names TAK-653 and NBI-1065845) is an experimental drug being investigated as a treatment for treatment-resistant depression. It is being developed by Neurocrine Biosciences and Takeda Pharmaceuticals (Millennium Pharmaceuticals, Inc.). Takeda Pharmaceuticals discovered the molecule originally, and holds exclusive right to market the drug in Japan, while Neurocrine Biosciences holds the right to market it to the rest of the world.

== Pharmacology ==
=== Pharmacodynamics ===
Osavampator is a selective positive allosteric modulator (PAM) of the AMPA receptor. Osavampator and other AMPA PAMs potentiate the effects of agonists at the main site of the AMPA receptor by slowing the rate of desensitization and internalization of the receptor.

=== Pharmacokinetics ===
The terminal half-life of osavampator is 33.1 to 47.8 hours.

== Research ==
=== Depression ===
There is evidence suggesting that activation of the AMPA receptor, downstream activation of mammalian target of rapamycin (mTOR), and upregulation of brain-derived neurotrophic factor (BDNF) are central to the antidepressant effects of certain NMDA receptor antagonists such as ketamine. Blockage of the AMPA receptor nullifies the antidepressant actions of ketamine in rodents. By potentiating the effect of endogenous glutamate at the AMPA receptor, osavampator more directly influences AMPA receptor-mediated transcription.

The potential use of osavampator as a non-psychotomimetic antidepressant is cited as reason for its investigation. Initial research found that osavampator, unlike ketamine, did not induce hyperlocomotor responses in rats. However, a later human trial investigating the central nervous system (CNS) stimulatory properties and tolerability of osavampator reported that although the CNS stimulatory properties of the drug were less pronounced than other psychostimulants, osavampator did appear to possess at least some stimulant-like effects. No severe adverse effects were noted in the trial.

AMPA receptor agonists are likely not viable for clinical applications as they present a risk of inducing seizures and overexcitation-induced neurotoxicity at doses close to their therapeutic window. Osavampator possesses minimal direct AMPA agonist properties. Osavampator provides a 419-fold safety margin against convulsions relative to therapeutic doses in rats.

== See also ==
- List of investigational antidepressants
