= Nanodomain =

A nanodomain is a nanometer-sized cluster of proteins found in a cell membrane. They are associated with the signal which occurs when a single calcium ion channel opens on a cell membrane, allowing an influx of calcium ions (Ca^{2+}) which extend in a plume a few tens of nanometres from the channel pore. In a nanodomain, the coupling distance, that is, the distance between the calcium-binding proteins which sense the calcium, and the calcium channel, is very small, less than 100 nm (3.9×10^{−6} in), which allows rapid signalling. The formation of a nanodomain signal is virtually instantaneous following the opening of the calcium channel, as calcium ions move rapidly into the cell along a steep concentration gradient. The nanodomain signal collapses just as quickly when the calcium channel closes, as the ions rapidly diffuse away from the pore. Formation of a nanodomain signal requires the influx of only approximately 1000 calcium ions.

Coupling distances greater than 100 nm (3.9×10^{−6} in), mediated by a larger number of channels, are referred to as microdomains. nanodomain

== Properties ==
Nanodomain signals are thought to improve the temporal precision of fast exocytosis of vesicles due to two specific properties:

- The peak concentration of calcium ions will be reached incredibly quick (within a microsecond) and maintained as long as the channel is open.
- Closure of the channel leads to a rapid collapse of the domain due to lateral diffusion away from the pore (the site of entry). The lateral diffusion of microdomains additionally depends on the action of fast endogenous buffers (which remove the calcium and transport it away from the active zone).

Single channels are able to cause vesicular release, however, the cooperativity of different calcium channels is synapse-specific. The release driven by a single calcium ion channel minimizes the total calcium ion influx, overlapping domains can provide greater reliability and temporal fidelity.
