= Irampanel =

Chemical compound

Clinical data
- ATC code: None

Identifiers
- IUPAC name: N,N-Dimethyl-2-[2-(3-phenyl-1,2,4-oxadiazol-5-yl)phenoxy]ethanamine
- CAS Number: 206260-33-5
- PubChem CID: 3038472
- ChemSpider: 2302037
- UNII: R2GZD7LMYX
- ChEMBL: ChEMBL29741
- CompTox Dashboard (EPA): DTXSID30174647

Chemical and physical data
- Formula: C_{18}H_{19}N_{3}O_{2}
- Molar mass: 309.369 g·mol^{−1}
- 3D model (JSmol): Interactive image
- SMILES: CN(C)CCOc1ccccc1c2nc(no2)c3ccccc3
- InChI: InChI=1S/C18H19N3O2/c1-21(2)12-13-22-16-11-7-6-10-15(16)18-19-17(20-23-18)14-8-4-3-5-9-14/h3-11H,12-13H2,1-2H3; Key:QZULPCPLWGCGSL-UHFFFAOYSA-N

Irampanel (INN, code name BIIR-561) is a drug which acts as a dual noncompetitive antagonist of the AMPA receptor and neuronal voltage-gated sodium channel blocker. It was under development by Boehringer Ingelheim for the treatment of acute stroke/cerebral ischemia but never completed clinical trials for this indication. Irampanel was also trialed, originally, for the treatment of epilepsy and pain, but these indications, too, were abandoned, and the drug was ultimately never marketed.
