= Amidrine =

Combination drug

Amidrine, Midrin, Nodolor, Duradrin, IDA, Migquin, Migrin-A, Migrazone or Epidrine is a combination drug consisting of paracetamol, dichloralphenazone and isometheptene used to treat migraines and severe, refractory headaches.

== Components ==
- Paracetamol, also known as acetaminophen, is a common over-the-counter pain reliever and fever reducer.
- Dichloralphenazone is a prodrug of two pharmacologically distinct agents: the sedative agent, chloral hydrate, as well as antipyrine, a non-steroidal anti-inflammatory drug that works to decrease inflammation.
- Isometheptene is a sympathomimetic drug that works by inducing vasoconstriction, causing constriction of cerebral blood vessels and reducing migraine symptoms.

== Availability ==
Midrin was discontinued by Caraco Pharmaceuticals as of 2009, after an FDA seizure of 33 drugs manufactured by Caraco Pharmaceuticals due to cGMP (Current Good Manufacturing Practices) violations. Generic forms of Amidrine were also discontinued due to loss of FDA grandfather approval status. Thus, manufacturer interest faded. The discontinued generic forms are: Amidrine (Actavis), Duradrin (Barr), I.D.A (Teva), Migquin (Qualitest), Migrin-A (Prasco) and Migrazone (Breckenridge). However, it is now being manufactured by Macoven Pharmaceuticals and marketed under the name Nodolor, as of April 2014. It can also be obtained through a compounding pharmacy with a doctor's prescription.
