= Persistent sodium current =

Biological current

The persistent sodium current (INaP) (also called the "late sodium current" or "non/slow-inactivating sodium current") is a form of sub-threshold, biological electric current contributed by non-inactivating voltage-gated sodium channels found in several central neurons. INaP has been implicated in neuronal excitability, epilepsy, and neuropathic pain.

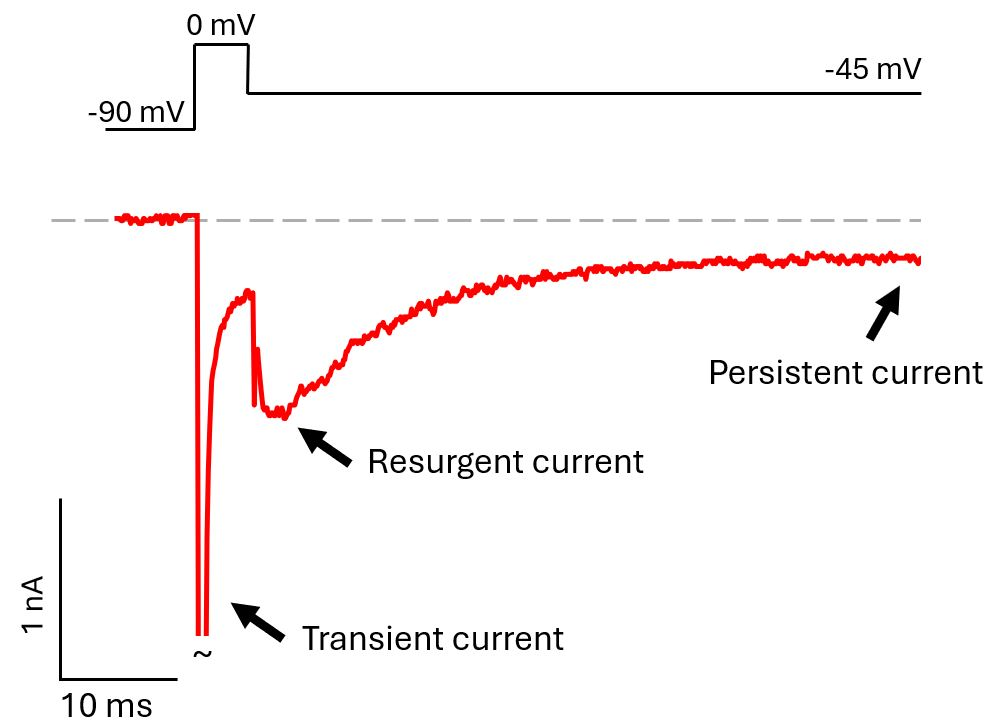
This is a voltage-clamp recording of a voltage-gated sodium current from an acutely isolated mouse cerebellar Purkinje neuron.The "persistent sodium current" is defined in this instance as the remaining sodium current following the transient current. In this particular recording, the red trace shows a Purkinje neuron that was stepped from -90mV to 0mV for 5ms to inactivate all transient current, then repolarized at -45mV for 30ms. Here, the persistent sodium current is best measured at the end of the step. Typically, experimenters will use TTX-subtracted voltage-ramp protocols to measure the persistent sodium current

== Biophysics ==
Persistent sodium current generation is hypothesized to occur by the incomplete inactivation of the voltage-gated sodium channel current (INa), where the channel becomes constitutively active and conducts sodium, creating a "persistently active" inward sodium current. Upon depolarization, the four identical motifs of the sodium channel (which contain six transmembrane segments that include a pore-forming loop and a voltage sensor) move outward to allow for sodium influx. Sodium channels have the intrinsic ability to close rapidly following depolarization, and this current, named the "transient sodium current" is large and contributes to the bulk of the action potential. However, electrophysiological recordings which isolate INa find small amounts of current following depolarization which slowly inactivates, therefore contributing to the "persistent" or "non-inactivating" sodium current. The persistent sodium current also functions at sub-threshold voltages and is not only measured on depolarization of the membrane, and therefore may modulate neuronal excitability during the interspike interval of action potentials.

== Health and disease ==
INaP is involved in long QT syndrome, Brugada syndrome, and other inherited arrhythmias. Further, previous research has shown that increases in INaP contributes to hypoxia (medicine), demyelination, paroxysmal extreme pain disorder, and epilepsies.

Pharmacological blockers of INaP are used clinically in many of these disorders. Amiodarone, while primarily blocking the human Ether-a-go-go-Related Gene potassium channel, has shown to significantly reduce persistent sodium current by 50% in cortical neurons as well as in cardiac sodium channel NaV1.5 and is used to treat arrhythmia. Cannabidiol has been used as an anti-epileptic for individuals with Dravet syndrome and may block the fast transient and persistent sodium currents, although in high concentration. GS967, also known as Prax330, is used to treat cardiac arrhythmias and surprisingly blocks the persistent sodium current in a study of Dravet syndrome which resulted in reduced seizures.
