= Dichloralphenazone =

Chemical compound

Combination of
- Phenazone: Analgesic
- Chloral hydrate: Sedative

Clinical data
- MedlinePlus: a601064
- Routes of administration: Oral
- ATC code: N05CC04 (WHO)

Legal status
- Legal status: US: Schedule IV

Identifiers
- CAS Number: 480-30-8
- PubChem CID: 10188
- DrugBank: DB01495
- ChemSpider: 9776
- UNII: YYX637R279
- KEGG: D03785
- CompTox Dashboard (EPA): DTXSID2022919
- ECHA InfoCard: 100.006.861

Dichloralphenazone is a 1:2 mixture of antipyrine with chloral hydrate. In combination with paracetamol and isometheptene, it is the active ingredient of medications for migraine and tension headaches, including Epidrin and Midrin. Performance impairments are common with this drug and caution is advised, for example when driving motor vehicles. Additional uses of dichloralphenazone include sedation for the treatment of short-term insomnia, although there are probably better drug choices for the treatment of insomnia.

== See also ==
- Chloral betaine
