= Perampanel =

Anti-epileptic medication

Clinical data
- Trade names: Fycompa
- Other names: E2007
- AHFS/Drugs.com: Monograph
- MedlinePlus: a614006
- License data: US DailyMed: Perampanel
- Pregnancy category: AU: B3
- Routes of administration: By mouth
- Drug class: Anticonvulsant
- ATC code: N03AX22 (WHO)

Legal status
- Legal status: AU: S4 (Prescription only); BR: Class B1 (Psychoactive drugs); CA: ℞-only; UK: POM (Prescription only); US: Schedule III; EU: Rx-only

Pharmacokinetic data
- Bioavailability: 116%
- Protein binding: 95–96%
- Metabolism: Liver, mostly via CYP3A4 and/or CYP3A5
- Elimination half-life: 105 hours, 295 hours (moderate hepatic impairment)
- Excretion: 70% faeces, 30% urine

Identifiers
- IUPAC name: 5'-(2-cyanophenyl)-1'-phenyl-2,3'-bipyridinyl-6'(1H)-one
- CAS Number: 380917-97-5; as hydrate: 1571982-04-1
- PubChem CID: 9924495; as hydrate: 70679123
- IUPHAR/BPS: 7050
- DrugBank: DB08883; as hydrate: DBSALT001824
- ChemSpider: 8100130; as hydrate: 28533413
- UNII: H821664NPK; as hydrate: 8LIX22217M
- KEGG: D08964; as hydrate: D10780
- ChEBI: CHEBI:71013; as hydrate: CHEBI:71015
- ChEMBL: ChEMBL1214124
- PDB ligand: 6ZP (PDBe, RCSB PDB)
- CompTox Dashboard (EPA): DTXSID80191501
- ECHA InfoCard: 100.219.846

Chemical and physical data
- Formula: C_{23}H_{15}N_{3}O
- Molar mass: 349.393 g·mol^{−1}
- 3D model (JSmol): Interactive image
- SMILES: N#Cc2ccccc2-c1cc(-c4ncccc4)cn(c1=O)-c3ccccc3
- InChI: InChI=1S/C23H15N3O/c24-15-17-8-4-5-11-20(17)21-14-18(22-12-6-7-13-25-22) 16-26(23(21)27)19-9-2-1-3-10-19/h1-14,16H; Key:PRMWGUBFXWROHD-UHFFFAOYSA-N; as hydrate: InChI=1S/4C23H15N3O.3H2O/c4*24-15-17-8-4-5-11-20(17)21-14-18(22-12-6-7-13-25-22)16-26(23(21)27)19-9-2-1-3-10-19;;;/h4*1-14,16H;3*1H2; Key:PDWMJDKMSASBNE-UHFFFAOYSA-N

Perampanel, sold under the brand name Fycompa, is an anti-epileptic medication developed by Eisai that is used in addition to other medications to treat partial seizures and generalized tonic–clonic seizures. Perampanel is a non-competitive AMPA glutamate receptor antagonist. It is taken by mouth.

Perampanel was approved in 2012, and as of 2016, its optimal role in the treatment of epilepsy relative to other drugs is not clear. It is the first anti-epileptic drug in the class of selective non-competitive antagonist of AMPA receptors.

The US prescribing information has a boxed warning that perampanel may cause serious psychiatric and behavioral changes; it may cause homicidal or suicidal thoughts. Other side effects have included dizziness, somnolence, vertigo, aggression, anger, loss of coordination, blurred vision, irritability, and slurred speech. Perampanel reduced the effectiveness of levonorgestrel oral contraceptives by about 40%. Women who may get pregnant should not take it as studies in animals show it may harm a fetus. Perampanel is liable to be abused; very high doses produced euphoria responses similar to ketamine. It is designated as a Schedule III controlled substance by the US Drug Enforcement Administration. Perampanel is authorized as a generic medication.

== Medical uses ==
Perampanel is used in addition to other drugs to treat partial seizures and generalized tonic–clonic seizures for people older than twelve years.

In the US, perampanel is indicated for the treatment of partial-onset seizures with or without secondarily generalized seizures in people with epilepsy aged four years of age and older; and for adjunctive therapy in the treatment of primary generalized tonic-clonic seizures in people with epilepsy aged twelve years of age and older.

In the EU, perampanel is indicated for the adjunctive treatment of partial-onset seizures with or without secondarily generalized seizures in people aged twelve years of age and older with epilepsy; and for the adjunctive treatment of primary generalized tonic-clonic seizures in people aged twelve years of age and older with idiopathic generalized epilepsy.

== Contraindications ==
Based on animal data, perampanel may cause fetal harm; it is not recommended for women of child-bearing age not taking contraception.

People with severe liver impairment or severe kidney disease, including those on dialysis, should not take perampanel.

== Side effects ==
Perampanel's label has a black box warning noting that some people taking the drug have undergone serious psychiatric and behavioral changes. These events occurred in people who had no history of such issues, as well as people who had such a history. The psychiatric changes included mood changes such as euphoria, anger, irritability, aggression, belligerence, agitation, and anxiety, as well as psychosis and delirium. Behavioral changes included physical assault and homicidal ideation or threats.

Other serious side effects include suicidal thoughts or behavior, dizziness and gait disturbance, somnolence and fatigue, risk of falls, and increased risk of seizures if the drug is quickly withdrawn.

In clinical trials, dizziness, somnolence, vertigo, aggression, anger, loss of coordination, blurred vision, irritability, and slurred speech were the side effects that most commonly led people to leave the trial.

Perampanel is liable to be abused: very high doses produced euphoria responses and dissociative effects similar to ketamine, although subjects liked it less and had experienced it more negatively than ketamine. It is designated as a Schedule III controlled substance by the Drug Enforcement Administration. A study of dependence in rats found withdrawal symptoms when the drug was removed; dependence in humans wasn't studied well enough to make generalizations as of April 2016. There is limited experience with overdose.

== Interactions ==
Perampanel reduced the effectiveness of levonorgestrel oral contraceptives by about 40%. Other antieptilectic drugs that induce cytochrome P450, including carbamazepine, phenytoin, and oxcarbazepine decrease the effectiveness of perampanel by 50-67%. Use of perampanel with strong CYP3A inducers like rifampin or St. John's wort is not recommended. Use of perampanel with CNS depressants like alcohol may increase the effect of the CNS depressant.

== Pharmacology ==
Perampanel is a selective non-competitive antagonist of AMPA receptors, the major subtype of ionotropic glutamate receptors. It was the first drug of this class approved for epilepsy.

Whole-cell voltage clamp studies have demonstrated that perampanel is a negative allosteric AMPA receptor antagonist. Perampanel caused a slow (τ~1 s at 3 μM), concentration-dependent inhibition of AMPA receptor currents. The rates of block and unblock of AMPA receptor currents were 1.5×10^{5} M^{−1} s^{−1} and 0.58 s^{−1}, respectively. Perampanel did not affect NMDA receptor currents. The extent of block (IC_{50}, 0.56 μM) was similar at all agonist concentrations, demonstrating a noncompetitive blocking action. Parampanel did affect AMPA receptor desensitization, or the ratio of peak to late response to rapid application of AMPA. Perampanel is a selective negative allosteric AMPA receptor antagonist of high-affinity and slow blocking kinetics, and is not use-dependent.

Perampanel has a prolonged terminal half-life in humans of approximately 105 hours. The drug is 95% bound to plasma protein. Its primary route of metabolism is by CYP3A4. It does not induce P450 enzymes. About 70% of the dose is excreted in the feces and 30% in the urine; less than 2% of the dose is excreted unchanged into the urine.

== Chemistry ==
The chemical formula of perampanel is 2-(2-oxo-1-phenyl-5-pyridin-2-yl-1,2-dihydropyridin-3-yl)benzonitrile; it has a bipyridine core structure that sets it apart from other AMPA receptor antagonists.

The tablets contain lactose monohydrate, low substituted hydroxypropyl cellulose, povidone, microcrystalline cellulose, magnesium stearate, hypromellose, polyethylene glycol, talc, and titanium dioxide in addition to the API; the oral suspension contains sorbitol, microcrystalline cellulose, carboxymethylcellulose sodium, poloxamer, simethicone, citric acid, sodium benzoate and purified water in addition to the API.

== History ==
It was authorized for medical use in the European Union in July 2012, and as of July 2016, was authorized as an adjunct treatment of partial-onset seizures with or without secondarily generalized seizures in people with epilepsy older than twelve years and as an adjunct treatment of primary generalized tonic–clonic seizures for people older than twelve years who have idiopathic generalized epilepsy.

It was approved for medical use in the United States in October 2012, and then in June 2015, for the same uses as those in the European Union. The oral suspension was approved for medical use in the United States in April 2016.

== Research ==
A 2016 review found it effective for both indications but due to the newness of the drug was unable to describe its optimal role in the treatment of epilepsy relative to other drugs. A 2014 review of the probability of added benefit of perampanel to the standard of care was unable to come to any conclusions, as no trial conducted by Eisai compared perampanel to a drug within the standard of care, but only to placebo.
