= Ergotamine/chlorcyclizine/caffeine =

Antimigraine medication

Combination of
- Ergotamine: Ergot alkaloid
- Chlorcyclizine: Antihistamine
- Caffeine: Stimulant

Clinical data
- Trade names: Anervan

Identifiers
- ChemSpider: None

Ergotamine/chlorcyclizine/caffeine, sold under the brand name Anervan, is an antimigraine medication, intended to be taken at the very beginning of a migraine episode.
