= Gephyrotoxin =

Names
- Preferred IUPAC name 2-{(1R,3aR,5aR,6R,9aS)-6-[(2Z)-Pent-2-en-4-yn-1-yl]dodecahydropyrrolo[1,2-a]quinolin-1-yl}ethan-1-ol
- Other names Histrionicotoxin D; HTX D

Identifiers
CAS Number	55893-12-4
3D model (JSmol)	Interactive image
ChemSpider	4942391
PubChem CID	6437870
UNII	01N796R81A
CompTox Dashboard (EPA)	DTXSID401029722
- InChI: InChI=1S/C19H29NO/c1-2-3-4-6-15-7-5-8-19-18(15)12-11-16-9-10-17(13-14-21)20(16)19/h1,3-4,15-19,21H,5-14H2/b4-3-/t15-,16-,17+,18+,19-/m0/s1
- SMILES: C#C\C=C/C[C@@H]3[C@H]2CC[C@H]1N([C@H](CC1)CCO)[C@H]2CCC3

Properties
Chemical formula	C_{19}H_{29}NO
Molar mass	287.447 g·mol^{−1}
- Except where otherwise noted, data are given for materials in their standard state (at 25 °C [77 °F], 100 kPa). Infobox references

Gephyrotoxin is a naturally occurring product that stems from the Colombian tropical frog Dendrobates histrionicus. It is a member of the class of compounds known as histrionicotoxins. This alkaloid skin secretion was first isolated from the tropical frog in 1977 by Daly and his fellow workers.

== Biological uses ==
This compound is a relatively non-toxic chemical. At first it showed activity as a slight muscarinic antagonist, but with recent studies it has shown other interesting neurological activities. Due to these new activities, many laboratories want to conduct future research on it. Due to this demand and the scarcity and lack of abundance of the tree frog the synthesis of this product is of much interest.

== Synthesis ==
The first total synthesis of gephyrotoxin was performed by Kishi and his co-workers, here they prepped an intermediate from L-pyroglutamic acid in 18 steps. Others have made it to the same intermediate in fewer steps but have included poorly diastereoselective steps. In 2008 Santarem and colleges reported total synthesis of Gephyrotoxin by obtaining an enantiopure cis-2,5-disubstituted pyrrolidine. Unlike others that included a poorly diastereoselective step, this process allowed for the development of two stereogenic centers at the same time.
