= Migraleve =

Migraine medication by Pfizer

Migraleve is the brand name of a range of migraine-relief medications made by Pfizer.

There are two variants of Migraleve: yellow and pink. Both contain the analgesics paracetamol and codeine. The yellow variant is designed to address the symptoms of headache and discomfort, while the pink variant also addresses nausea and vomiting. A third Migraleve variant, Migraleve Ultra, contains sumatriptan.

The pink tablet is supposed to be taken before the yellow tablet.

== Migraleve Pink ==
The active ingredients of Migraleve Pink are:

- Paracetamol DC 96% 520 mg is equivalent to paracetamol 500 mg, codeine phosphate 8 mg, and buclizine hydrochloride 6.25 mg.

Other ingredients: magnesium stearate, colloidal anhydrous silica, stearic acid, pregelatinised maize starch, gelatin, hypromellose, macrogol, E127 (erythrosine), aluminium oxide and E171 (titanium dioxide).

== Migraleve Yellow ==
The active ingredients of Migraleve Yellow are:

- paracetamol DC 96% 520 mg equivalent to paracetamol 500 mg and codeine phosphate 8 mg.

Other ingredients: magnesium stearate, colloidal anhydrous silica, stearic acid, pregelatinised maize starch, gelatin, hypromellose, macrogol, E104 (quinoline yellow), aluminium oxide, E171 (titanium dioxide) and E172 (iron oxide yellow).

== Migraleve Ultra ==
The active ingredient of Migraleve Ultra is 50 mg sumatriptan, similar to Imigran recovery.

== License and manufacture ==
The product licence holder is: Pfizer Consumer Healthcare, Walton-on-the-Hill, Surrey, KT20 7NS

The manufacturer is: Gödecke GmbH, Mooswaldallee 1, 79090, Freiburg, Germany.
