= Buclizine =

Chemical compound

Clinical data
- AHFS/Drugs.com: Micromedex Detailed Consumer Information
- ATC code: R06AE01 (WHO)

Identifiers
- IUPAC name: (RS)-1-[(4-chlorophenyl)- phenyl-methyl]-4- [(4-tert-butylphenyl) methyl] piperazine
- CAS Number: 82-95-1
- PubChem CID: 6729
- IUPHAR/BPS: 7134
- DrugBank: DB00354
- ChemSpider: 6473
- UNII: 0C94V6X681
- ChEBI: CHEBI:3205
- ChEMBL: ChEMBL1201271
- CompTox Dashboard (EPA): DTXSID0022694
- ECHA InfoCard: 100.001.317

Chemical and physical data
- Formula: C_{28}H_{33}ClN_{2}
- Molar mass: 433.04 g·mol^{−1}
- 3D model (JSmol): Interactive image
- Chirality: Racemic mixture
- SMILES: Clc1ccc(cc1)C(c2ccccc2)N3CCN(CC3)Cc4ccc(cc4)C(C)(C)C
- InChI: InChI=1S/C28H33ClN2/c1-28(2,3)25-13-9-22(10-14-25)21-30-17-19-31(20-18-30)27(23-7-5-4-6-8-23)24-11-15-26(29)16-12-24/h4-16,27H,17-21H2,1-3H3; Key:MOYGZHXDRJNJEP-UHFFFAOYSA-N

Buclizine is an antihistamine and anticholinergic of the diphenylmethylpiperazine group. It is considered to be an antiemetic, similar to meclizine.

In the United Kingdom, buclizine is one of three drugs contained in Migraleve tablets, marketed by McNeil Healthcare for migraines.
