= Selurampanel =

Chemical compound

Clinical data
- ATC code: None

Identifiers
- IUPAC name: N-[7-Isopropyl-6-(2-methylpyrazol-3-yl)-2,4-dioxo-1H-quinazolin-3-yl]methanesulfonamide
- CAS Number: 912574-69-7
- PubChem CID: 45381907
- ChemSpider: 32698379
- UNII: 7WG1MR7DAR
- CompTox Dashboard (EPA): DTXSID00238467

Chemical and physical data
- Formula: C_{16}H_{19}N_{5}O_{4}S
- Molar mass: 377.42 g·mol^{−1}
- 3D model (JSmol): Interactive image
- SMILES: CC(C)c1cc2c(cc1c3ccnn3C)c(=O)n(c(=O)[nH]2)NS(=O)(=O)C
- InChI: InChI=1S/C16H19N5O4S/c1-9(2)10-8-13-12(7-11(10)14-5-6-17-20(14)3)15(22)21(16(23)18-13)19-26(4,24)25/h5-9,19H,1-4H3,(H,18,23); Key:MCECSFFXUPEPDB-UHFFFAOYSA-N

Selurampanel (INN, code name BGG492) is a drug closely related to the quinoxalinedione series which acts as a competitive antagonist of the AMPA and kainate receptors and, as of 2015, is being investigated in clinical trials by Novartis for the treatment of epilepsy. It has also been studied in the acute treatment of migraine, and was found to produce some pain relief, but with a relatively high rate of side effects.
