= Tezampanel =

Chemical compound

Clinical data
- Other names: LY-293,558; LY-293558; LY293558; LY-326,325; LY-326325; LY326325; NGX-424; NGX424
- Routes of administration: IV
- ATC code: none

Legal status
- Legal status: Investigational

Identifiers
- IUPAC name: (3S,4aR,6R,8aR)-6-[2-(1H-tetrazol-5-yl)ethyl]decahydroisoquinoline-3-carboxylic acid
- CAS Number: 154652-83-2
- PubChem CID: 127894
- IUPHAR/BPS: 4245
- ChemSpider: 113428
- UNII: GA36S2O9C2
- KEGG: D06656
- ChEMBL: ChEMBL14935

Chemical and physical data
- Formula: C_{13}H_{21}N_{5}O_{2}
- Molar mass: 279.344 g·mol^{−1}
- 3D model (JSmol): Interactive image
- SMILES: C1C[C@H]2CN[C@@H](C[C@H]2C[C@H]1CCC3=NNN=N3)C(=O)O
- InChI: InChI=1S/C13H21N5O2/c19-13(20)11-6-10-5-8(1-3-9(10)7-14-11)2-4-12-15-17-18-16-12/h8-11,14H,1-7H2,(H,19,20)(H,15,16,17,18)/t8-,9+,10-,11+/m1/s1; Key:ZXFRFPSZAKNPQQ-YTWAJWBKSA-N

Tezampanel (INN, USAN) (developmental code names LY-293,558, LY-326,325, NGX-424) is a drug originally developed by Eli Lilly which acts as a competitive antagonist of the AMPA and kainate subtypes of the ionotropic glutamate receptor family, with selectivity for the GluR5 subtype of the kainate receptor. It has neuroprotective and anticonvulsant properties, the former of which may, at least in part, occur via blockade of calcium uptake into neurons.

Tezampanel has a range of effects which may be useful for medicinal purposes, as well as its applications in scientific research. It suppresses both the withdrawal symptoms from morphine and other opioids, and the development of tolerance, as well as having antihyperalgesic and analgesic effects in its own right. It also has anxiolytic effects in animal studies and has been suggested as a candidate for the treatment of anxiety in humans.

Whereas tezampanel free base is known as LY-293558, tezampanel hydrochloride is said to be known as LY-326325.
