= Willardiine =

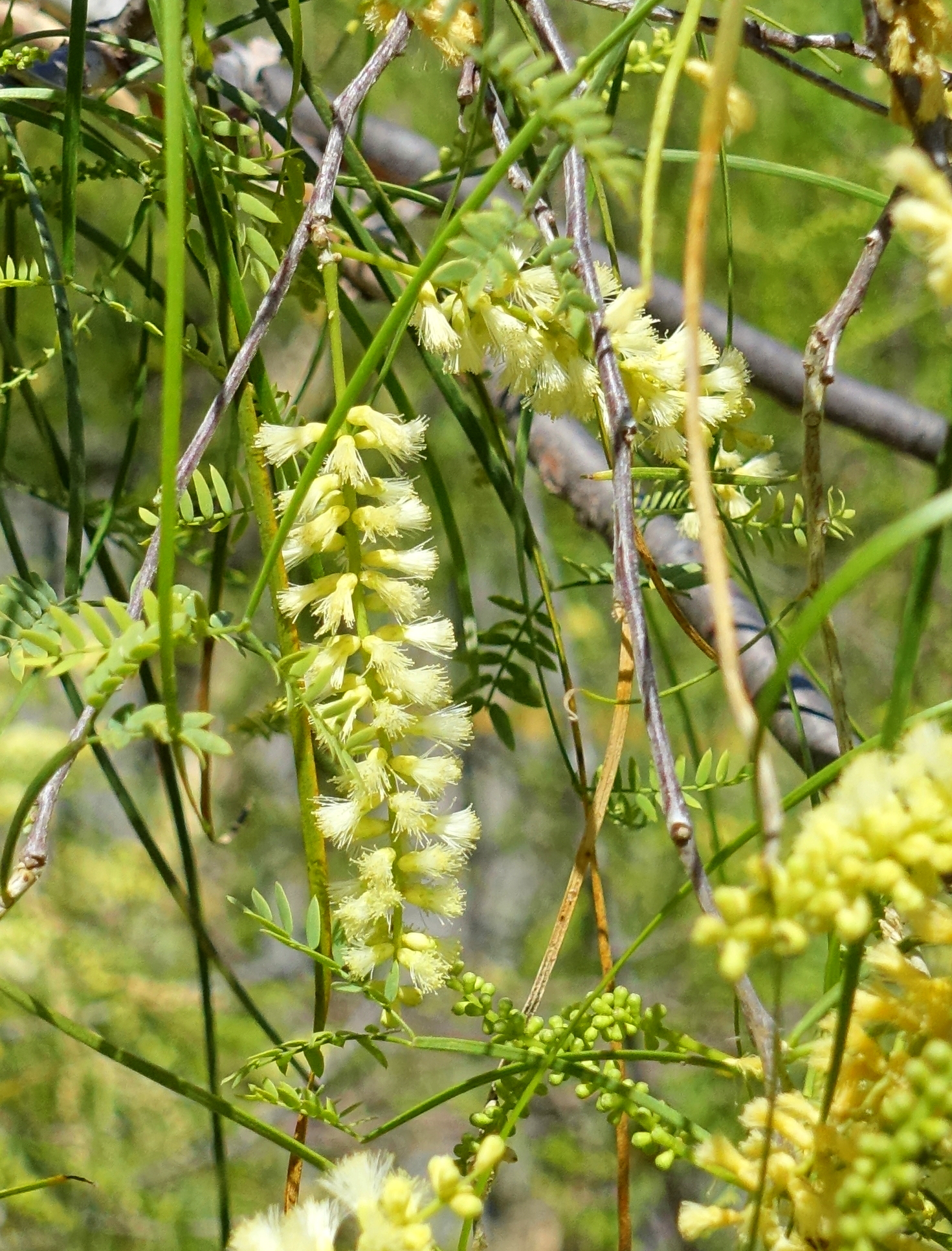
- Flowers of Mariosousa willardiana

Names
- IUPAC name 3-(2,4-Dioxo-3,4-dihydropyrimidin-1(2H)-yl)-L-alanine
- Systematic IUPAC name (2S)-2-Amino-3-(2,4-dioxo-3,4-dihydropyrimidin-1(2H)-yl)propanoic acid
- Other names: 3-(Uracil-1-yl)-L-alanine; 3-(1-Uracyl)-L-alanine

Identifiers
CAS Number	19772-76-0
3D model (JSmol)	Interactive image
Beilstein Reference	20710
ChEBI	CHEBI:15851
ChEMBL	ChEMBL122005
ChemSpider	389063
DrugBank	DB04129
KEGG	C03584
MeSH	Willardiine
PubChem CID	440053
CompTox Dashboard (EPA)	DTXSID201017167
- InChI: InChI=1S/C7H9N3O4/c8-4(6(12)13)3-10-2-1-5(11)9-7(10)14/h1-2,4H,3,8H2,(H,12,13)(H,9,11,14)/t4-/m0/s1 Key: FACUYWPMDKTVFU-BYPYZUCNSA-N
- SMILES: C1=CN(C(=O)NC1=O)C[C@@H](C(=O)O)N

Properties
Chemical formula	C_{7}H_{9}N_{3}O_{4}
Molar mass	199.166 g·mol^{−1}
log P	−4.4
Acidity (pK_{a})	2.97
Basicity (pK_{b})	9.76
- Except where otherwise noted, data are given for materials in their standard state (at 25 °C [77 °F], 100 kPa). Infobox references

Willardiine (correctly spelled with two successive i's) or (S)-1-(2-amino-2-carboxyethyl)pyrimidine-2,4-dione is a chemical compound that occurs naturally in the seeds of Mariosousa willardiana and Acacia sensu lato. The seedlings of these plants contain enzymes capable of complex chemical substitutions that result in the formation of free amino acids (See: #Synthesis). Willardiine is frequently studied for its function in higher level plants. Additionally, many derivates of willardiine are researched for their potential in pharmaceutical development. Willardiine was discovered in 1959 by R. Gmelin, when he isolated several free, non-protein amino acids from Acacia willardiana (another name for Mariosousa willardiana) when he was studying how these families of plants synthesize uracilyalanines. A related compound, Isowillardiine, was concurrently isolated by a different group, and it was discovered that the two compounds had different structural and functional properties. Subsequent research on willardiine has focused on the functional significance of different substitutions at the nitrogen group and the development of analogs of willardiine with different pharmacokinetic properties. In general, Willardiine is one of the first compounds studied in which slight changes to molecular structure result in compounds with significantly different pharmacokinetic properties.

Willardiine is a partial agonist of Ionotropic glutamate receptors. These receptors are found at excitatory synapses and bind glutamate (the major excitatory neurotransmitter) and structurally similar ligands, such as willardiine. Receptor activation leads to influx of positive ions into the neuron, resulting in neural depolarization (See: #Structure and Activity). Willardiine specifically agonizes non-NMDA glutamate receptors: AMPA and kainate receptors.

Willardiine analogs have been developed that have different binding affinities for the AMPA and kainate receptors. These analogs have been used to study the structure of these receptors, as well as the functional significance of receptor activation in different brain regions. While willardiine and its analogs have not been explicitly studied as therapeutics, there are a variety of neurological disorders characterized by alterations in glutamate signaling, and ligands for AMPA and kainate receptors are often studied as potential therapeutics.

== Chemistry ==
=== Structure and activity ===
==== Structure ====
Willardiine was isolated from Acacia Willardiana and characterized as 3-(1-uracyl)-L-alanine, based on elemental composition and stability in strong acid, which were used to deduce the organic structure of willardiine (Figure 1).

Figure 1. Structure of (S)-Willardiine

The experimentally derived properties of willardiine are similar to L-albizziine, which was isolated from the same seed. Subsequent synthetic work proved the structure and properties of willardiine (see: #Synthesis).

The family of willardiine compounds (see: #Analogs) all have a uracil or substituted uracil as the primary amino acid side chain. Willardiine naturally exists as two isomers:

- (S)-Willardiine
- (R)-Willardiine

Only the (S) isomer has binding affinity for the AMPA and kainate receptors. Isomer-specific binding affinity is a result of steric effects between (R)-Willardiine and the binding site on the receptor.

==== Activity ====
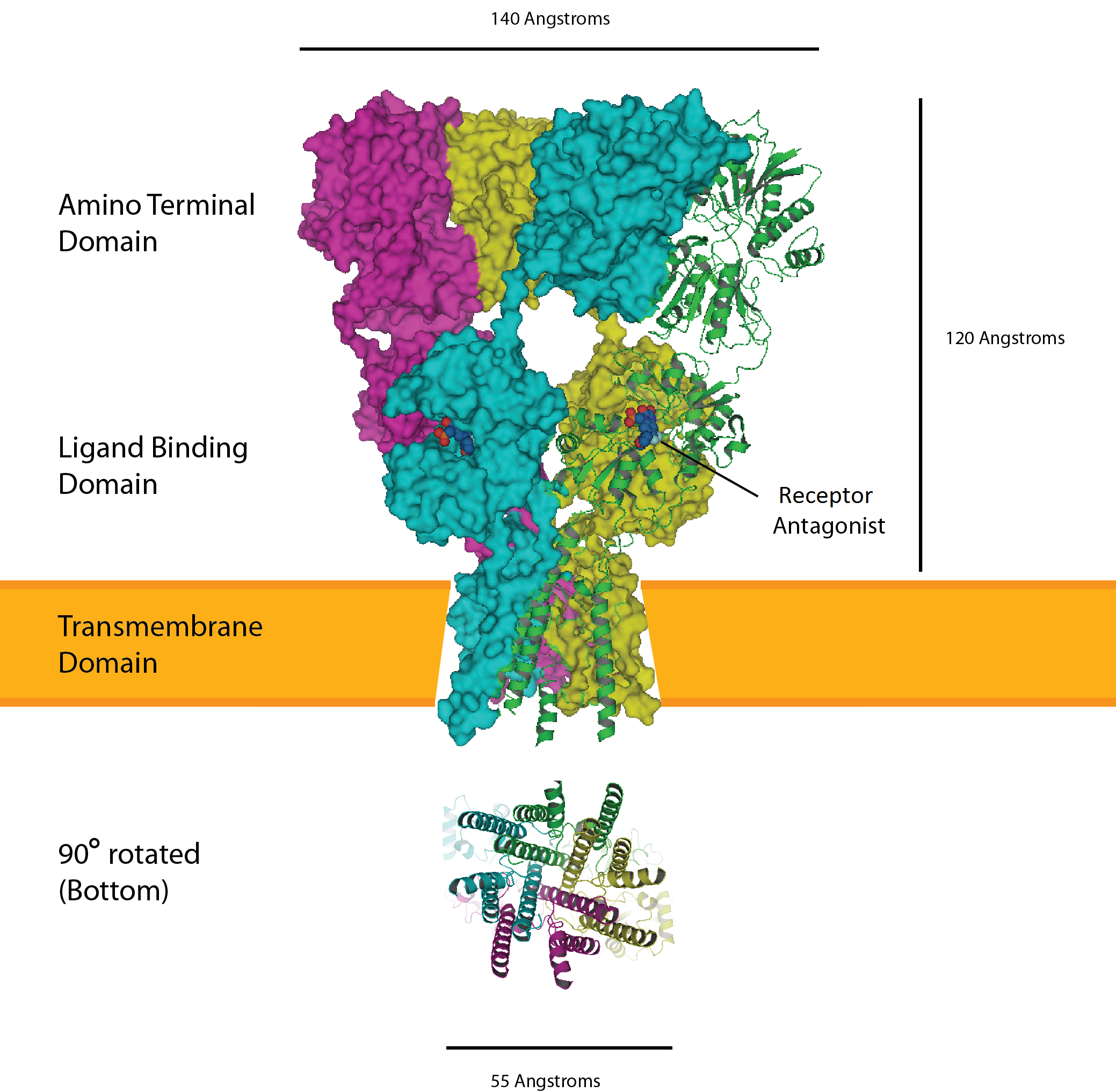
Figure 2. AMPA receptor structure. Willardiine binds to the ligand binding domain.

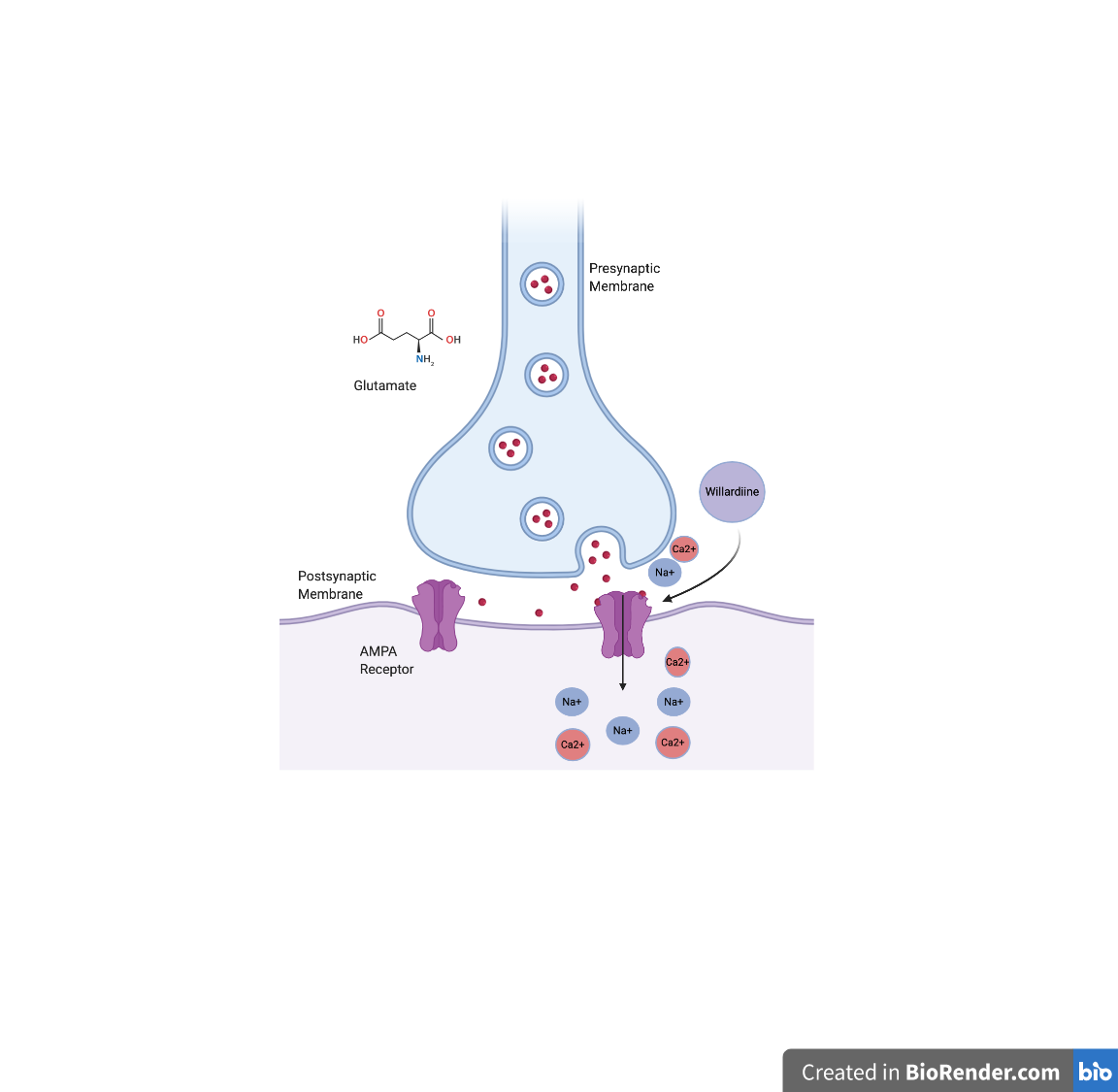
Figure 3. Typical AMPA Receptor Activation. Glutamate (red) is released by vesicles at the synapse. Glutamate or another agonist (such as willardiine) binds to AMPA receptors (purple) to cause a conformational change that opens cation channels. Sodium and calcium influx results in activation of a variety of proteins.

AMPA receptors are tetrameric transmembrane proteins with distinct amino terminal, ligand binding, and transmembrane domains (Figure 2). They are expressed on postsynaptic membranes on neurons, and are expressed widely throughout the brain. Willardiine binds to glutamate receptors at the glutamate binding site in the extracellular ligand binding domain (Figure 2). Binding causes a conformational change that opens the receptor and allows for positively charged ions, Na^{+} and/or Ca^{2+} to enter the cell** (Figure 3). This depolarizes, and activates, the neuron, resulting in the firing of an action potential. The ion can also initiate a signaling cascade to activate different types of proteins that influence the cell, such as kinases or transcription factors.

**Passage of calcium through the AMPA receptor ("calcium permeability") is based on the presence of the edited GluA2 subunit (See: Glur2 RNA editing). The ion pore region of GluA2 mRNA is edited during translation to render it calcium impermeable in over 99% of AMPA receptors.

Like AMPA receptors, kainate receptors are tetrameric, transmembrane, ionotropic glutamate receptors on glutamatergic neurons. They have five subunits, divided into two main families: GluK_{1,2}, and GluK_{5,6,7}. An endogenous ligand, either kainic acid or glutamate, binds to the ligand binding site. However, unlike AMPA receptors, external ions also bind to kainate receptors at the ion binding pocket on the extracellular domain. When both the ligand and ion bind, the receptor undergoes a conformational change and the ion channel opens. This allows the flow of positive ions, such as sodium or calcium. The influx of positively charged ions depolarizes, or excites, the neuron (Figure 4). Like AMPA receptors, the permeability to calcium is dependent on the editing of receptor subunit mRNA. The rise and decay times of postsynaptic potentials is much slower in kainate receptors than AMPA receptors.

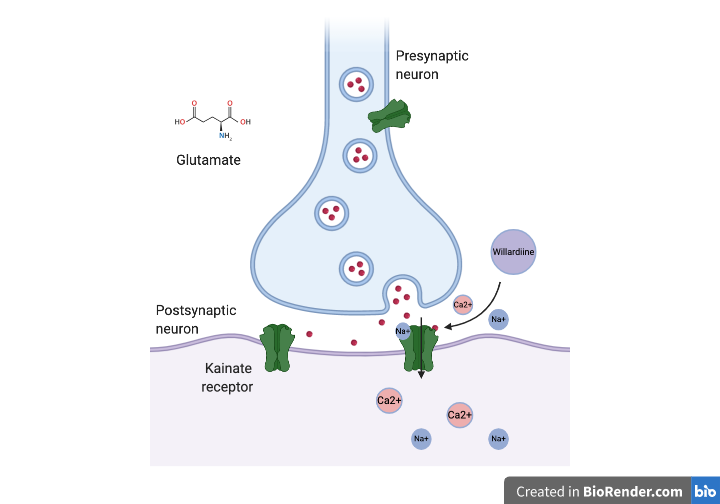
Figure 4. Kainate receptor activation by a ligand. Glutamate (red) is released from vesicles on the presynaptic membrane. This release is mediated by presynaptic kainate receptors. The ligand (such as willardiine), and an external ion (such as sodium) bind to a postsynaptic kainate receptor and opens the ion channel, allowing the influx of sodium and calcium ions.

Kainate receptors are much less ubiquitously expressed throughout the brain and have a less significant role in plasticity than AMP receptors. In general, the function of kainate receptors is much less characterized than AMPA receptors. Interestingly, kainate receptors are expressed on the presynaptic membrane as well as the postsynaptic membrane. It is believed that presynaptic expression mediates the amount of neurotransmitter released from the cell (Figure 4). It is also known that kainic acid can induce seizures.

Both kainate and AMPA receptors are also affected by a variety of exogenous ligands, including willardiine. Only the (S) isomer of willardiine is a potent agonist of non-NMDA glutamate receptors. The precise binding has been characterized on cloned AMPA and Kainate receptors by analyzing the amount of displaced radiolabelled agonist (AMPA and kainate, respectively), which represents the binding affinity of willardiine to the receptor. (S)-willardiine displaces significantly less AMPA/kainate than its analogs, such as 5-Fluorowillardiine or 5-Iodowillardiine. Willardiine has the strongest binding affinity at AMPA subunit GluR4 and the kainate receptor subunit GluK5.

The displacement of glutamate by willardiine is primarily exothermic, with favorable binding enthalpy of -5±1 kCal/mol.

The structure and activity of willardiine were determined through elucidating the natural synthesis of willardiine and creating a synthetic mechanism of synthesis that can be used to create willardiine and its analogs to be studying in vitro and in vivo.

=== Synthesis ===
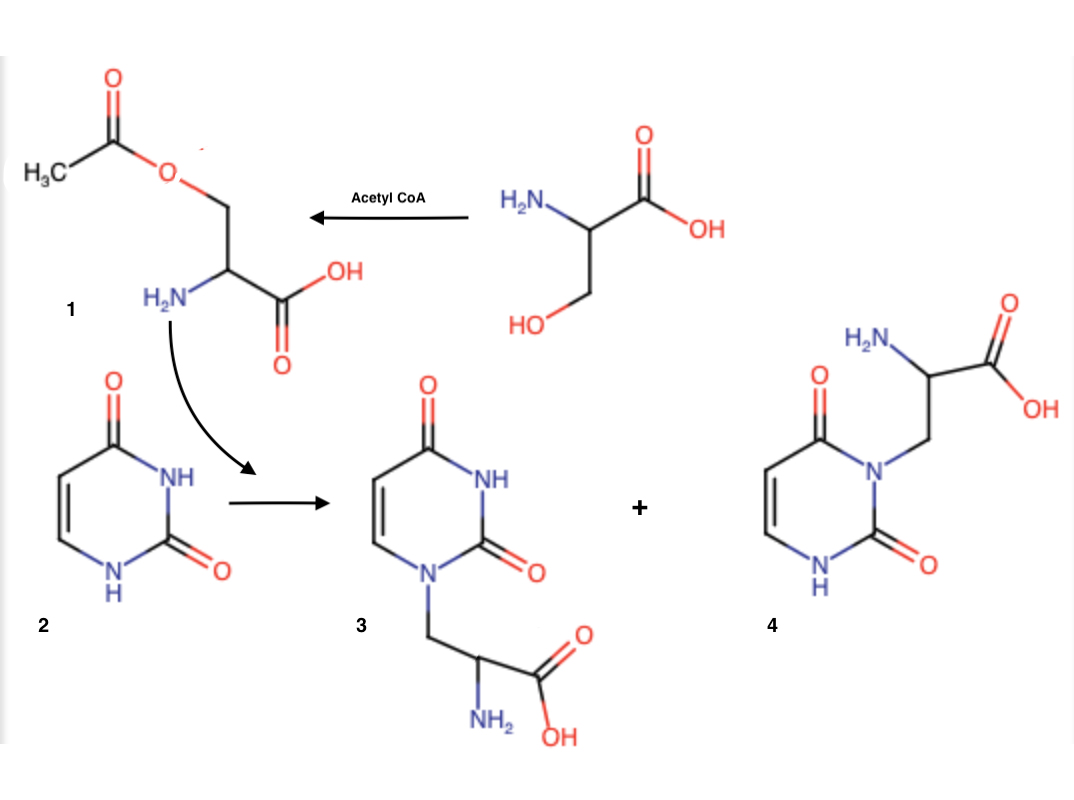
Figure 5. Biosynthesis of willardiine (3) and Isowillardiine (4) by enzymes of Pisum sativum and related seedlings

The natural synthesis of willardiine and Isowillardiine from seedlings has been characterized (Figure 5). The synthesis consists of a free uracil ring at nitrogen being substituted for an alanyl side chain, derived from O-acetyl-L-serine.

The synthesis of willardiine has also been replicated in vitro, in which willardiine is synthesized from linear urea, which is made from a solution of acyl isocynate in Benzene with aminoacetaldehyde. Linear urea is cyclized to uracil when treated with aqueous alkali. Hydrolysis of uracil with Hydrochloric acid gives uracil-1-ylacetaldehyde. Hydrolysis of uracil-1-ylacetaldehyde with Potassium cyanide, Ammonia, and Ammonium chloride give the final structure of willardiine. This final synthesis of willardiine from uracil-1-lyacetaldehyde is carried out under the conditions of Strecker amino acid synthesis (Figure 5).

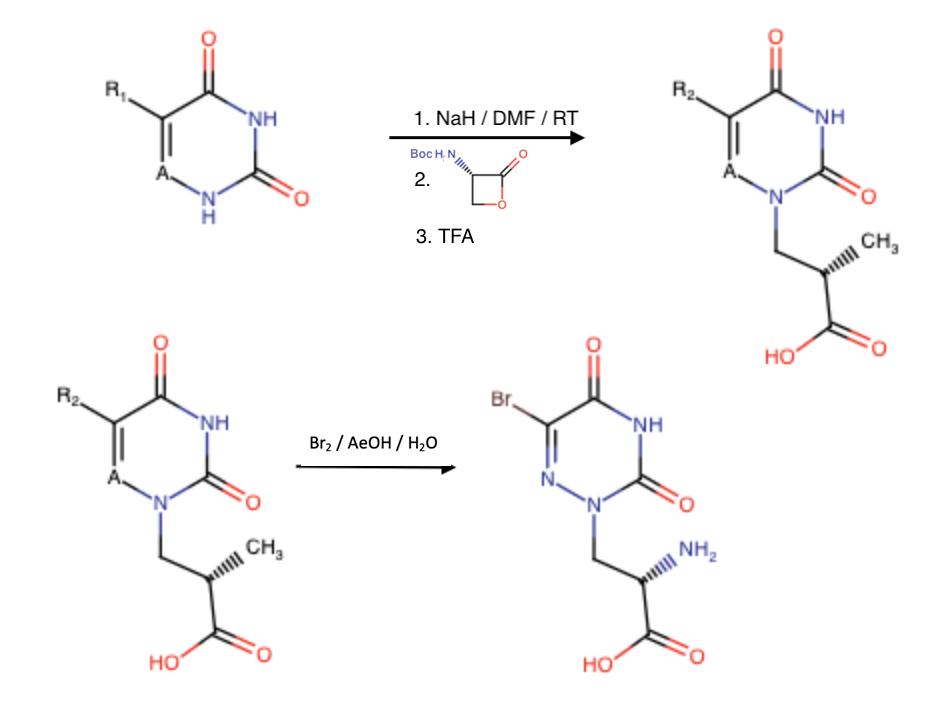
Figure 6. Reactions of substituted uracils at position R_{1} or 6-azauracils at position R_{2} in DMF to synthesize willardiine. The 5-bromo-substituted analog was synthesized in the presence of bromine in acetic acid.

The lower binding affinity of willardiine for the AMPA and kainate receptors can be attributed to the unsubstituted carbon on position 5 of the 6-membered ring. Substitutions of large, electron-withdrawing groups at this position increase the affinity for kainate receptors but decrease the binding affinity for AMPA receptors. An example of the synthesis of one analog, 5-bromowillardiine, is shown in Figure 6.

Derivatives of willardiine have also been developed as Kainate receptor antagonists. These were synthesized through the addition of substituents to the N^{3} position of the 6-membered ring on the natural product willardiine (Figure 7).

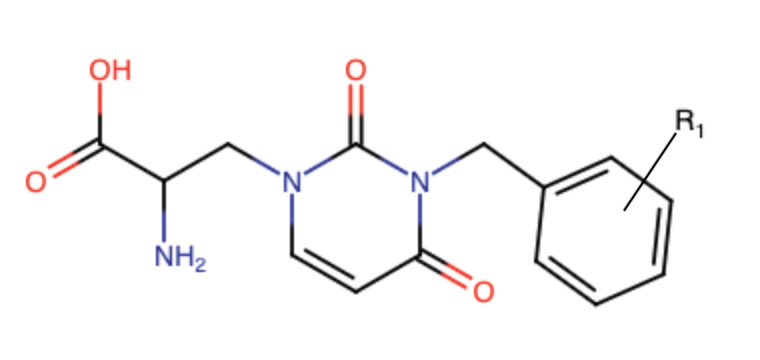
Figure 7. General structure of willardiine antagonist. See: #Analogs for R substitution on each synthesized antagonist.

=== Analogs ===
==== Agonists ====
The most common analogs of willardiine are also agonists of AMPA and kainate receptors. Each analogs differs in the substitution at the 5th position on the six-membered ring, and the most commonly studied analogs have a halogen at this position which is added through a Halogen addition reaction (Figure 6). The addition of a halogen affect the binding affinities and stability of the analogs. The analogs are more stable than unsubstituted willardiine and have better binding affinity for AMPA receptors, though the chemistry underlying the change in binding mechanisms remains unknown.

- 5-Fluorowillardiine
- 6-azawillardiine
- 5-iodowillardiine
- 5-bromowillardiine

==== Antagonists ====
Derivative of willardiine have been developed as synthetic kainate and AMPA receptor antagonists (See: #Synthesis for specifics on development of antagonists).

- UBP282 (R = 4-COOH, (S))
- UBP296 (R = 2-COOH, (R/S))
- UBP302 (R = 4-COOH, (S))

These glutamate receptor antagonists all share a carboxylbenzyl substitution on the six-membered ring (Figure 7). UBP296 and UBP302 have been shown to have a 100-fold increase in binding kainate receptors over AMPA receptors, but UBP282 has competitive affinity for GluA2-containing AMPA receptors and GluK1-containing kainate receptors. These antagonists have therapeutic potential for a variety of neurological disorders characterized by aberrant activation of AMPA or kainate receptors (See: #Disease relevance). The pharmacokinetics of the compounds must be elucidated before they can be studied as potential therapeutics.

=== Pharmacokinetics ===
It is crucial to understand the pharmacokinetics of any compound that has the potential to be developed as a therapeutic. These properties describe the ADME properties of the compound, which will determine the route of administration, dose, and potential adverse effects of a drug. The pharmacokinetic properties of willardiine have been studied using whole-cell recordings of mouse embryonic neurons. Willardiine desensitizes AMPA receptors with an EC_{50} of 44.8 uM, which makes it 4 times less potent that AMPA (EC50 = 11 uM), and 30 times less potent than its analog 5-Fluorowillardiine (EC50 = 1.5 uM).

Many of the pharmacokinetic properties of willardiine remain unknown due to a lack of in vivo or clinical research. Specific ADME properties have been predicted using admetSAR, a free tool that predicts properties of absorbance, distribution, metabolism, and excretion (Table 1).

The pKa of willardiine is approximately 10, meaning that willardiine is uncharged, or protonated, at physiological pH.

Table 1. Predicted pharmacokinetic properties of willardiine
PROPERTY	VALUE	SOURCE
Water solubility	13.2 mg/mL	ALOGPS
logP	-0.7	ALOGPS
logP	-1.3	ChemAxon
logS	-1.2	ALOGPS
pKa (Strongest Acidic)	9.76	ChemAxon
pKa (Strongest Basic)	2.97	ChemAxon
Physiological Charge	0	ChemAxon
Hydrogen Acceptor Count	4	ChemAxon
Hydrogen Donor Count	2	ChemAxon
Polar Surface Area	101.73 Å2	ChemAxon
Rotatable Bond Count	4	ChemAxon
Refractivity	46.01 m3·mol-1	ChemAxon
Polarizability	17.89 Å3	ChemAxon
Number of Rings	1	ChemAxon
Bioavailability	1	ChemAxon
Rule of Five	Yes	ChemAxon
Ghose Filter	No	ChemAxon
Veber's Rule	No	ChemAxon
MDDR-like Rule	No	ChemAxon

== Applications in research ==
Willardiine and its analogs bind to AMPA and Kainate receptors. These glutamate receptors are the primary mediators of excitation in the central nervous system, and are commonly studied in hippocampal or cortical neurons. Because of their different binding affinities for each receptor, members of the willardiine family have been used to determine the structural/function consequences of activation of AMPA/kainate receptors by different agonists or antagonists. Additionally, in rat spinal motor neurons, it was demonstrated that different analogs of willardiine affected different non-NMDA glutamate receptors. This finding contributed to the discovery of kainate and AMPA receptors as two structurally and functionally different receptors.

=== Structure assays ===
Crystallography studies of AMPA receptors in the willardiine-bound state have shown how the conformation of the receptor changes throughout the binding, resulting channel activation, and unbinding of a partial agonist. These studies found that the efficacy of the agonist was directly correlated to the extent of domain closure. These crystallography studies were performed with a variety of 5-position halogen-substituted willardiine analogs to show that steric hindrance influences the extent of domain closure.

Willardiine and its analogs have been used to study the effects of partial agonism on the structure and function of AMPA receptors. Single channel recording of willardiine binding to AMPA receptors showed the fraction of time that the ion channel spends in an open state. These experiments gave important insight into the structure of AMPA receptors when a partial agonist is bound, as compared to a full agonist or antagonist.

Additionally, derivatives of willardiine with an additional carboxyl group (Figure 6) are potent AMPA and/or kainate receptor antagonists. Slight differences in the position of the substitution significantly changes the binding affinity for the receptors. The synthetic antagonists also have different affinities for each subunit of the kainate and AMPA receptors. Thus, the synthetic UBP antagonists can be used to study the structural elements of each binding site that are important for activation or inhibition of the receptor based on the subunit.

=== Functional assays ===
Willardiine and its analogs can be used to study the effects of AMPA and kainate receptor activation or inhibition on neuronal activity and animal behavior. AMPA receptors activate neurons due to the influx of sodium and sometimes calcium after the binding of a ligand to the ligand binding domain (figure 3). Kainate receptors also transmit positive ions, but the resulting change in postsynaptic potential is less pronounced than that of an AMPA receptor. As a partial agonist, willardiine could be applied electrophysiology studies of neurons to determine the specific changes in neuronal activity (as represented by electrical signals) when a partial agonist is bound.

Another way to track the activity of the receptors is through calcium imaging. Both kainate and AMPA receptors have different permeability for calcium based on the four subunits of the tetramer. For example, AMPA receptors are only permeable to calcium if the receptor is GluA2-lacking or contains unedited GluA2. Calcium imaging in the presence of willardiine and related analogs could differentiate what receptor subtypes are activated by each agonist or inhibited by each antagonist. This could further the understanding of the specific role of calcium permeable non-NMDA glutamate receptors.

The synthetic antagonists can be used to better understand the neuronal functions of kainate receptors. The functions of kainate receptors are not well characterized because of the lack of specific antagonists for the receptors. Two of the UBP antagonists have been determined to have high, specific binding affinity for kainate receptors. These antagonists can be used to study the contribution of kainate receptors on neuronal activity and behavior.

=== Localization assays ===
Radio-labeled willardiine has been used to study the distribution of AMPA and Kainate receptors in the brain, based on its function as both an AMPA receptor and Kainate receptor agonist.

=== Behavioral/disease model assays ===
A combination of functional, structural, and localization assays of willardiine and its analogs can be used to research a variety of neurological diseases that are characterized by dysregulated glutamate signaling, such as Parkinson's disease, Alzheimer's disease, or amyotrophic lateral sclerosis (ALS) (See: #Disease relevance).

Many neurological diseases have been studied using mouse models of human disease. These are mouse lines that have the pathological genotype of the respective disease. As a result, the mice can be used to study phenotypes caused by the disease. Mice can be given an injection or oral suspension of willardiine or an analog. Then, behavioral assays will determine if the compound is helpful in alleviating symptoms of the relevant disease. Different doses and formulations of the compound will help identify potential therapeutic applications and any dose-dependent affects. While willardiine has not been explicitly used to study behavior, AMPA receptors are frequently activated in behavioral studies to observe the effects of activation on development, learning, memory, and neurological disease (See: Potential Therapeutic Applications).

The aforementioned research could also help understand the potential application of willardiine and its more potent analogs and derived antagonists in treating neurological disease.

== Disease relevance ==
Willardiine and its analogs bind specifically to AMPA and kainate receptors, which are implicated in a variety of neurological disorders. The following section describes a few neurological diseases characterized by dysregulation in either AMPA or kainate receptor activation. This list is not exhaustive, and research in these fields is in constant development.

=== AMPA receptors in disease ===
==== Neurodegenerative disorders ====
AMPA receptors have an extensive physiological role in synaptic plasticity, which is the basis for many aspects of neural development, learning, and memory. Many neurodegenerative disorders are characterized by cognitive decline, which is mediated by changes in AMPA-mediated plasticity. This could be due to changes in AMPA receptor expression, trafficking, or activity in regions like the Hippocampus or Striatum. Combinations of the three processes have been shown to be dysregulated in animal models of Alzheimer's disease, Huntington's disease, and Parkinson's disease.

Animal models of Parkinson's disease have shown elevated levels of AMPA receptors in affected regions. While AMPA antagonism has been study as a potential treatment, the off-target effects of inhibiting AMPA receptors are too severe to justify the benefits towards symptoms of Parkinson's.

AMPA receptor deficits have been studied in animal models and human postmortem tissue of Huntington's disease. Expression of mutant Huntingtin impairs AMPA-mediated synaptic transmission by disrupting subunit transport across microtubules. Modulation of AMPA receptors in animal models of Huntington's disease have reduced degeneration in the striatum and reduced memory deficits.

==== Autism spectrum disorders ====
AMPA receptors role in synaptic plasticity is important not only for cognitive abilities but also in neural development. Expression of AMPA receptors, as well as NMDA receptors follows a specific sequence during development to differentially develop or silence synaptic connections. Incorrect expression or function of AMPA receptors during development can result in aberrant or incomplete synaptic connections, which can negatively impact cognitive development and result in intellectual disabilities.

There are reports of genetic alterations in humans with autism spectrum disorders that result in hemizygosity of the GluA2 subunit, which is crucial for mediating calcium permeability of the AMPA receptor. There are also genetic alterations in expression of proteins in the postsynaptic density that are crucial for the anchoring of the receptor to the membrane. Human GRIP1, SHANK3 (as well as other members of the SHANK family), and E3 Ubiquitin Ligase all have identified mutations in autism spectrum disorders that dysregulate AMPA synaptic expression.

The role of AMPA (and possibly kainate) receptors in autism spectrum disorders is also supported by the therapeutic effectiveness of topiramate, an AMPA/kainate receptor antagonize, in children with autism, pervasive developmental disorder, and obsessive–compulsive disorder. In multiple retrospective cohort studies, it was found that adolescent patients of these diseases had significant, positive changes in social conduct, hyperactivity, and attention with minor side effects.

==== Major depressive disorder ====
Similar to autism spectrum disorders, major depressive disorder has a variety of symptoms and etiologies that make it difficult to find a common molecular cause. There are many hypotheses about the biological basis of depression, including the glutamate hypothesis. This hypothesis was corroborated by evidence that NMDA antagonists have antidepressant effects in rodents. There are many NMDA antagonists currently being used in clinical studies that have safe, rapid antidepressant effects. A notable example is the novel use of ketamine as a rapid onset antidepressant. It is hypothesized that ketamine exerts its effects by blocking the activation of NMDA receptors, thus forcing the activation of AMPA receptors to compensate for lost synaptic glutamate. It remains unclear how AMPA activation results in antidepressant outcomes, but studies of AMPA agonists as potential therapeutic targets for depression have had promising preclinical results.

A major symptom of major depressive disorder is dysregulated sleep, which has recently been discovered to be mediated in part by AMPA receptors. AMPA receptors are selectively calcium permeable, based on the presence and amino acid composition of GluA2 (See: Activity). Trafficking of calcium permeable AMPA receptors (CP-AMPARs) is modulated during the sleep/wake cycle, although the mechanism is still not clear.

=== Kainate receptors in disease ===
==== Mood disorders ====
The role of kainate receptors in mood disorders is not well elucidated and studies are often contradictory. Postmortem studies have found a decrease in GluK1 mRNA in the prefrontal cortex and hippocampus of patients with schizophrenia. However, this has not been corroborated by other studies. Alternatively, some studies have found a decrease in GluK2, but not GluK1, mRNA in the prefrontal cortex of schizophrenia patients.

Genome-wide association studies of thousands of cases of schizophrenia have identified a single-nucleotide polymorphism (SNP) in the grik4 gene that alters gene expression. This SNP is more abundant in patients with bipolar disorder that respond to certain forms of medication (namely, selective serotonin reuptake inhibitors) over other forms of medication. This result suggests a role of differentially expressed GluK4 in bipolar disorder and responses to medication, but research into the specific mechanism is still ongoing. GriK2 knockout mice have shown increased hyperactivity, indicative of bipolar mania. There is no evidence, however, that GluK2 is part of the pathophysiology or just related to the symptoms.

==== Neuropathic pain ====
Kainate receptors are expressed throughout the dorsal root ganglion and dorsal horn in the spinal cord, which are crucial intermediary regions for transmission of sensory stimulation and pain. Molecular and electrophysiological characterization of these receptors shows that they are heteromeric receptors made up of GluK1 and GluK5 subunits. The activation of primary afferents results in activation of kainate receptor-mediated excitatory postsynaptic potentials on dorsal horn neurons, suggesting that kainate receptors are mediating the pain response.

==== Epilepsy ====
Epilepsy is characterized by imbalances in the ratio of neuronal excitation and inhibition. It is well characterized that injection of kainic acid can induce seizures, including temporal lobe epilepsy months after injection. It is thought that the increase of kainate receptor activation causes the formation of aberrant synapses in the hippocampus and other areas that are considered to have a low epileptogenic threshold. These aberrant synapses contain kainate receptors and increase the excitation of the brain region, which can induce excitotoxicity and seizures.

Consistent with these findings, transgenic mice with knocked out GluK1 have reduced seizures after treatment with kainic acid. GluK1 antagonists have been beneficial in preventing seizures in the hippocampus of mice (See: Potential therapeutic applications). In contrast, some research has produced promising results studying GluK1 agonists as treatment for epilepsy. These agonists are hypothesized to decrease the over-inhibition of hippocampal interneurons that is thought to be characterized of epilepsy.

The variety of linkages between kainate receptors and epilepsy demonstrate the difficulty in studying kainate receptors, based on the many hypothesized functions of the receptors. However, these varied and sometimes contradictory mechanisms of action showcase the numerous potentials of a kainate receptor therapeutic that can specifically target one brain region.

== Potential therapeutic applications ==
=== Willardiine-derived agonists ===
The disease relevance of non-NMDA glutamate receptors suggests a potential for willardiine as a therapeutic. However, since willardiine has a low binding affinity as a partial agonist, it is not commonly studied as a potential therapeutic for diseases characterized by dysregulated receptor expression or activation. Many of its analogs, for example 5-Fluorowillardiine, have increased binding affinity and specificity for either the AMPA and kainate receptor. These properties are more desirable for drug development: a lower dose will be needed to produce a therapeutic effect, and high specificity leads to less off-target or side effects.

AMPA agonists, and potentially willardiine analogs, are most commonly studied as treatments for Major depressive disorder (See: Disease relevance). Ketamine has a novel indication as an antidepressant for its function as an NMDA-antagonist. The inhibition of NMDA receptors results in increased activity of AMPA receptors, likely to compensate for the decrease in glutamate signaling. Direct AMPA agonists are currently in development as antidepressants, and preclinical studies suggest that these agonists are safe and efficacious in vitro and in animal models.

=== Willardiine-derived antagonists ===
The synthetic willardiine-derived kainate antagonists have shown specificity for the kainate receptor. There is evidence that these antagonists could be used to treat neurological disorders that have characteristic over-activation of kainate receptors. Willardiine-derived kainate antagonists have shown efficacy in treating pain, epilepsy, anxiety, ischemia and axonal degeneration.

For example, an antagonist to the GluK1 subunit of the kainate receptor could help prevent with epileptic seizures (See: Disease Relevance). Antagonists of GluK1 have prevented the development of epileptic activity in the hippocampus of pilocarpine-induced models of epilepsy. Additionally, kainate receptor antagonists have been shown to have analgesic effects in animal models of pain. One antagonist showed increased latency of escape in a hot plate test and decreased the amount of paw licking after exposure to a painful stimuli.

However, many of the willardiine-derived kainate antagonists also antagonize AMPA receptors. Inhibiting AMPA receptors can have severe toxic effects, such as dyskenesia and changes in mood caused by alterations in dopaminergic pathways. Thus, neither willardiine nor its analogs can be pursued as a therapeutic for any aforementioned neurological disorder until the toxicity and adverse effects of the compound are well characterized.

== Toxicity ==
The research applications and potentials for therapeutics are numerous because of the varied role of non-NMDA glutamate receptors in disease. However, because of their ubiquity in the brain and spinal cord, activation of these receptors can also result in toxic side effects. For this reason, the extracellular levels of AMPA agonists (such as endogenous glutamate) are strictly controlled in the brain and spinal cord. The main side effects of over-activation of AMPA receptors are seizure and neuron death.

There is limited in vivo research on the neurotoxicity of willardiine. Due to the low EC_{50}, Willardiine does not induce neurotoxicity at a therapeutic level. Analogs with higher binding affinity, such as 5-Fluorowillardiine, have been shown to induce seizure and cell death when administered at high doses.
