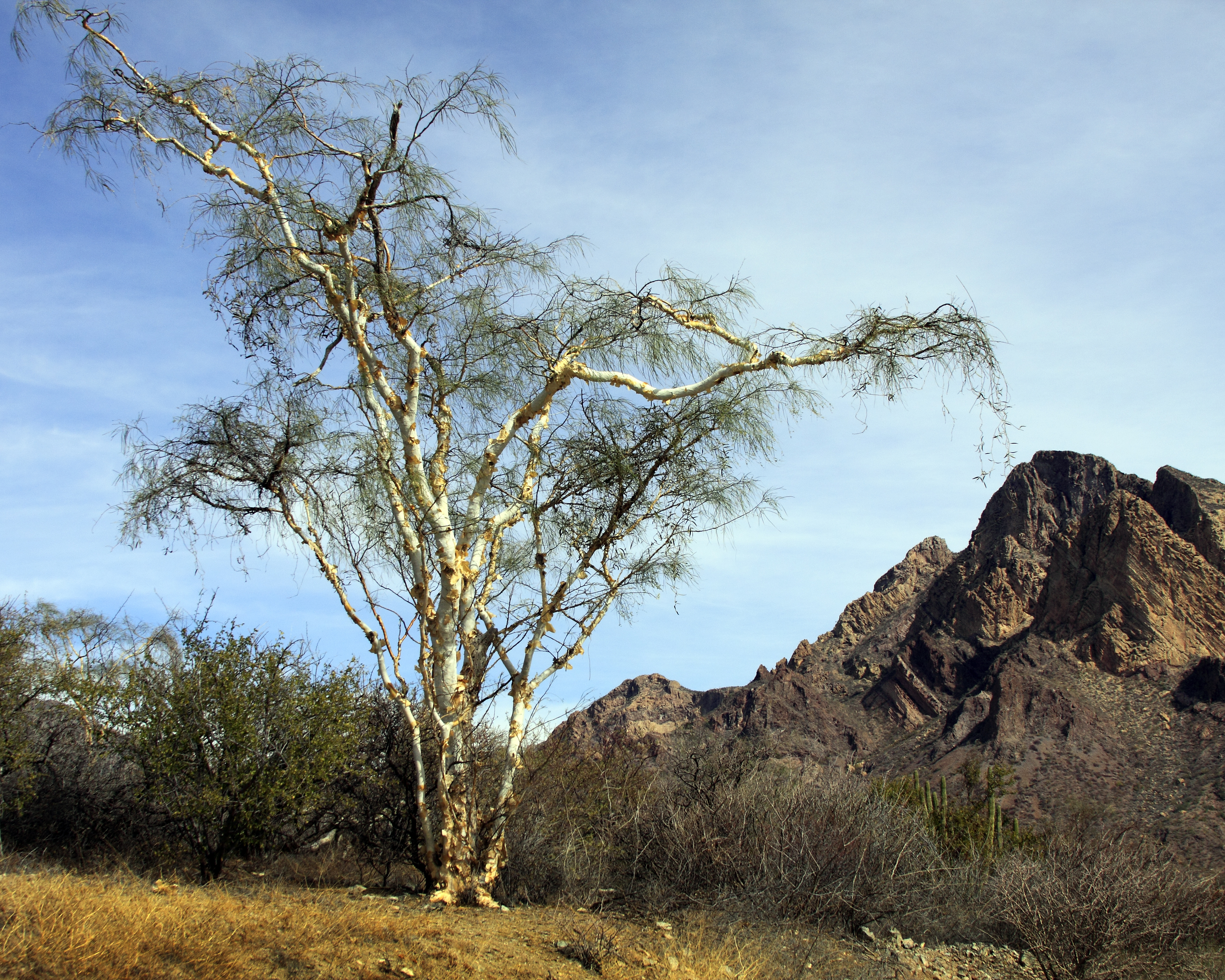
- Mariosousa willardiana

Scientific classification
- Kingdom: Plantae
- Clade: Tracheophytes
- Clade: Angiosperms
- Clade: Eudicots
- Clade: Rosids
- Order: Fabales
- Family: Fabaceae
- Subfamily: Caesalpinioideae
- Clade: Mimosoid clade
- Genus: Mariosousa; Seigler & Ebinger

Type species
- Mariosousa coulteri (Bentham) Seigler & Ebinger

Species
- 13; see text
- The range of the genus Mariosousa

Synonyms
- the Acacia coulteri group

= Mariosousa =

Genus of legumes

Mariosousa is a genus of 13 species of flowering plants in the family Fabaceae. It belongs to the mimosoid clade of the subfamily Caesalpinioideae. Members of this genus were formerly considered to belong to the genus Acacia.

Restricted in range to Central America, Mexico, and the southwestern United States, members of the genus are trees or shrubs bearing alternate, bipinnately compound leaves—each with a swelling at the base of the petiole—and white- to cream- or yellow-colored flowers. The flowers are typically borne in elongated, bottle brush–like spikes. The fruits that later replace these flowers are markedly flattened pods.

== Species ==
The genus Mariosousa comprises the following species:

- Mariosousa acatlensis (Benth.) Seigler & Ebinger—Acatlan acacia
- Mariosousa centralis (Britton & Rose) Seigler & Ebinger—Central American acacia
- Mariosousa compacta (Rose) Seigler & Ebinger
- Mariosousa coulteri (Benth.) Seigler & Ebinger—Coulter acacia
- Mariosousa dolichostachya (S.F. Blake) Seigler & Ebinger—longspike acacia
- Mariosousa durangensis (Britton & Rose) Seigler & Ebinger—Durango acacia
- Mariosousa heterophylla (Benth.) Seigler & Ebinger—palo blanco, Willard acacia
- Mariosousa mammifera (Schltdl.) Seigler & Ebinger
- Mariosousa millefolia (S. Watson) Seigler & Ebinger—Milfoil wattle, Santa Rita acacia
- Mariosousa russelliana (Britton & Rose) Seigler & Ebinger
- Mariosousa salazarii (Britton & Rose) Seigler & Ebinger
- Mariosousa sericea (Martens & Galeotii) Seigler & Ebinger
- Mariosousa usumacintensis (Lundell) Seigler & Ebinger

Mariosousa willardiana is considered a synonym of Mariosousa heterophylla.
