= Mariosousa usumacintensis =

Scientific classification
- Kingdom: Plantae
- Clade: Tracheophytes
- Clade: Angiosperms
- Clade: Eudicots
- Clade: Rosids
- Order: Fabales
- Family: Fabaceae
- Subfamily: Caesalpinioideae
- Clade: Mimosoid clade
- Genus: Mariosousa
- Species: M. usumacintensis

Binomial name
- Mariosousa usumacintensis (Lundell) Seigler & Ebinger

Synonyms
- Acacia usumacintensis Lundell

Species of legume

Mariosousa usumacintensis is a species of flowering plant in the family Fabaceae. It is native to Belize, Guatemala, Honduras, Southeast and Southwest Mexico (including the State of Tabasco), and Veracruz. It was named after the Río Usumacinta, near the location where the type specimen was collected. It is a tree up to 15 m (50 feet) tall. Prickles are located at the bases of the petioles, each prickle with a large flat gland near the base.
