= Mariosousa dolichostachya =

Conservation status
- Least Concern (IUCN 3.1)

Scientific classification
- Kingdom: Plantae
- Clade: Tracheophytes
- Clade: Angiosperms
- Clade: Eudicots
- Clade: Rosids
- Order: Fabales
- Family: Fabaceae
- Subfamily: Caesalpinioideae
- Clade: Mimosoid clade
- Genus: Mariosousa
- Species: M. dolichostachya

Binomial name
- Mariosousa dolichostachya (S. F. Blake) Seigler & Ebinger

Synonyms
- Acacia dolichostachya S. F. Blake

Species of legume

Mariosousa dolichostachya is a species of flowering plant in the family Fabaceae. It is found in Guatemala and Mexico. It is threatened by habitat loss.
