= Chemicalize =

Online chemistry tool

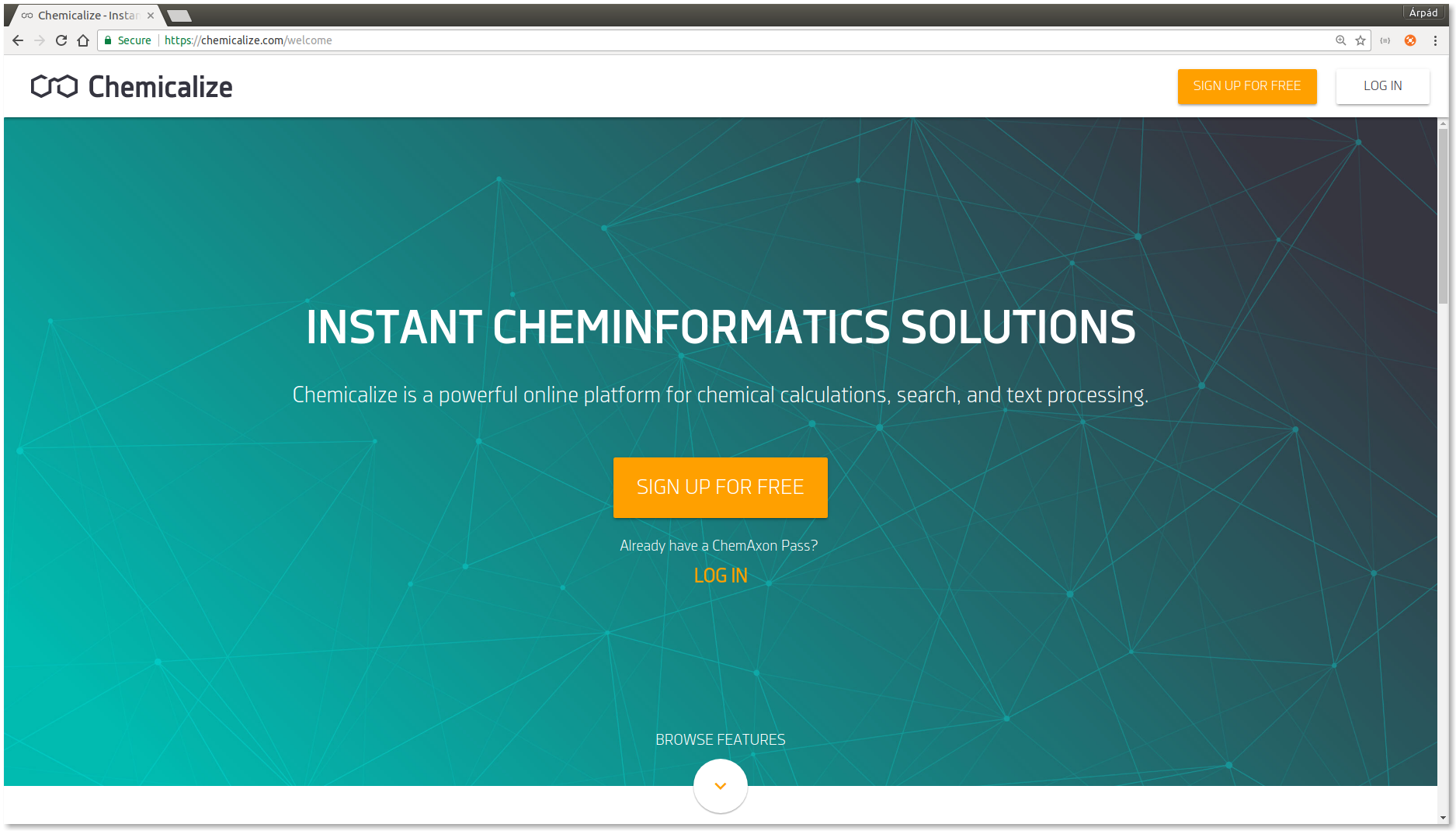
- Welcome page of Chemicalize Welcome page of Chemicalize
- Website type: Chemical property predictions, Structure-based database search
- Owner: ChemAxon
- Website: chemicalize.com
- Launched: January 11, 2009; 17 years ago
- Current status: Online

Chemicalize is an online platform for chemical calculations, search, and text processing. It is developed and owned by ChemAxon and offers various cheminformatics tools in freemium model: chemical property predictions, structure-based and text-based search, chemical text processing, and checking compounds with respect to national regulations of different countries.

== Modules of Chemicalize ==
Calculations

Chemical property predictions for any molecule structure. Available calculations include elemental analysis, names and identifiers (IUPAC name, SMILES, InChI), pKa, logP/logD, and solubility.

Chemical Search

Structure-based and text-based search against the Chemicalize database to find web page sources and associated structures of the results.

Compliance Checker

Checking compounds with respect to national regulations of several countries on narcotics, psychotropic drugs, explosives, hazardous materials, and toxic agents.

== Short history ==
January 2009 Original service launched

The service was launched with the brand name chemicalize.org. The main purpose was to identify chemical names on websites, but other services were also provided, such as property predictions and chemical search.

August 2010 ChemSpider integration

Predicted chemical properties provided by Chemicalize were integrated to ChemSpider. ChemSpider record pages contain links to access predicted properties on Chemicalize for the considered structure.

September 2016 Renewed version

The platform was renewed using a new brand name Chemicalize. The new version offers enriched functionality in freemium model.

May 2018 Chemicalize Professional released

Embeddable web components and hosted cheminformatics services, for web developers and integrators, based on Chemicalize cloud infrastructure.

== List of the predicted structure-based properties ==
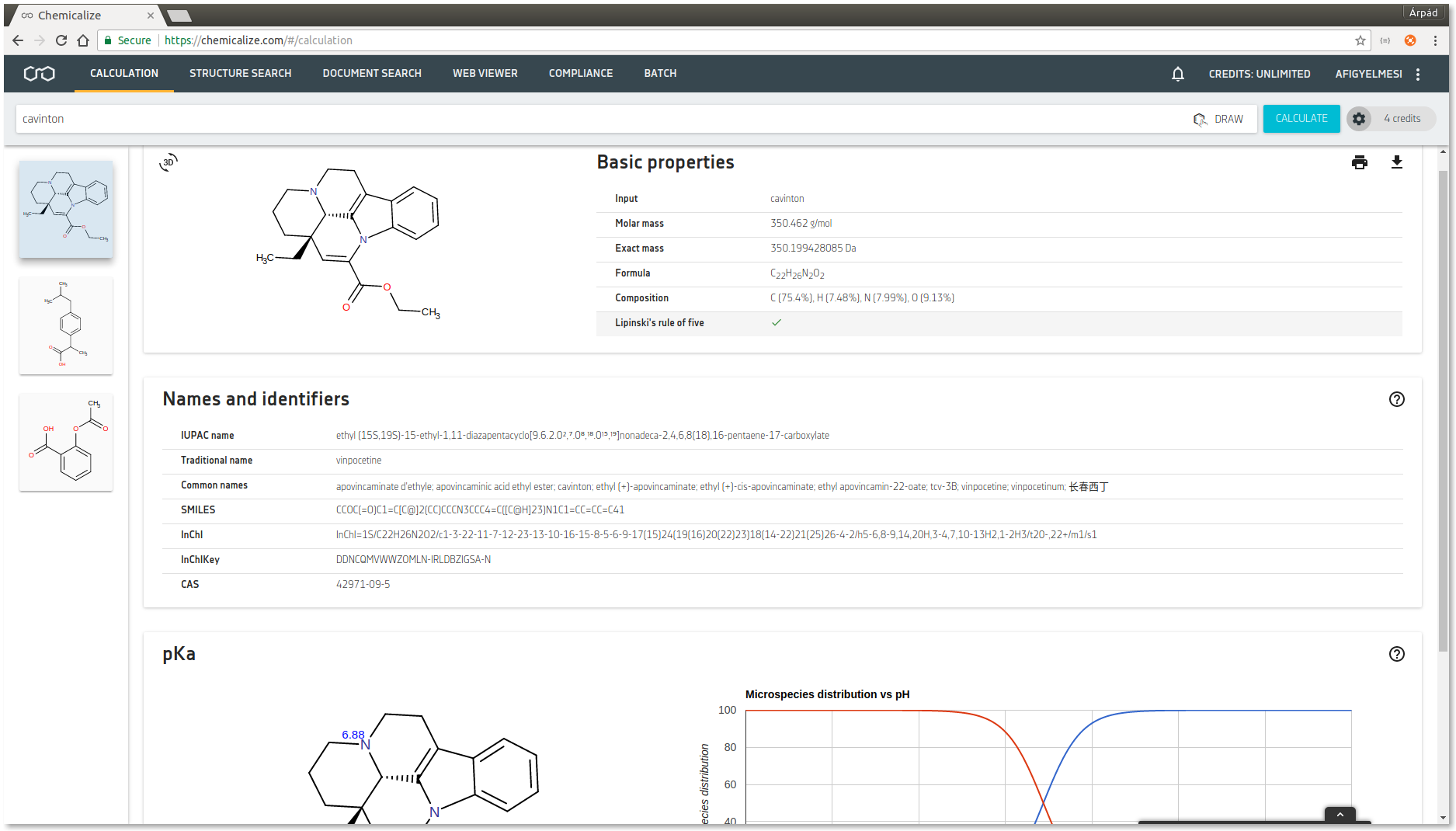
The chemical properties and calculations shown through the example of the Vinpocetine.

- IUPAC name
- InChI name
- pKa
- logP and logD
- Solubility
- NMR spectroscopy
- Isoelectric point
- Charge
- Polarizability
- Topology Analysis
- Geometry data
- Polar Surface Area
- Hydrogen bond Donor-Acceptor
- Refractivity
- Structural Framework
- Lipinski's Rule of Five

== See also ==
- ChemAxon
- ChemSpider
