= 5-Fluorowillardiine =

- Skeletal formula of (2S)-5-fluorowillardiine

Names
- Other names 2-Amino-3-(5-fluoro-2,4-dioxopyrimidin-1-yl)propanoic acid

Identifiers
CAS Number	(S): 140187-23-1
3D model (JSmol)	Interactive image; (S): Interactive image
ChEBI	CHEBI:42549
ChEMBL	ChEMBL123132
ChemSpider	1259; (S): 112461
DrugBank	DB02966
ECHA InfoCard	100.162.280
IUPHAR/BPS	4070
KEGG	(S): C13671
PubChem CID	1299; (S): 126569
UNII	7CTR2LWV5M
CompTox Dashboard (EPA)	DTXSID1042609
- InChI: InChI=1S/C7H8FN3O4/c8-3-1-11(2-4(9)6(13)14)7(15)10-5(3)12/h1,4H,2,9H2,(H,13,14)(H,10,12,15) Key: DBWPFHJYSTVBCZ-UHFFFAOYSA-N; InChI=1/C7H8FN3O4/c8-3-1-11(2-4(9)6(13)14)7(15)10-5(3)12/h1,4H,2,9H2,(H,13,14)(H,10,12,15) Key: DBWPFHJYSTVBCZ-UHFFFAOYAR; (S): InChI=1S/C7H8FN3O4/c8-3-1-11(2-4(9)6(13)14)7(15)10-5(3)12/h1,4H,2,9H2,(H,13,14)(H,10,12,15)/t4-/m0/s1 Key: DBWPFHJYSTVBCZ-BYPYZUCNSA-N
- SMILES: NC(CN1C=C(F)C(=O)N=C1O)C(O)=O; (S): C([C@@H](C(O)=O)N)N1C(=O)NC(=O)C(F)=C1

Properties
Chemical formula	C_{7}H_{8}FN_{3}O_{4}
Molar mass	217.156 g·mol^{−1}
log P	−1.168
Acidity (pK_{a})	2.118
Basicity (pK_{b})	11.879
Isoelectric point	4.28
- Except where otherwise noted, data are given for materials in their standard state (at 25 °C [77 °F], 100 kPa). verify (what is ?) Infobox references

5-Fluorowillardiine is a selective agonist for the AMPA receptor, with only limited effects at the kainate receptor. It is an excitotoxic neurotoxin when used in vivo and so is rarely used in intact animals, but it is widely used to selectively stimulate AMPA receptors in vitro. It is structurally similar to the compound willardiine, which is also an agonist for the AMPA and kainate receptors. Willardiine occurs naturally in Mariosousa willardiana and Acacia sensu lato.

== Toxicity ==
(S)-5-Fluorowillardiine activity has been studied in vitro in a variety of neural tissues. In mouse embryo hippocampal neurons, it was found to desensitize AMPA/kainate receptors with an EC_{50} of 1.5 μM – 7 times more potent than racemic AMPA (EC_{50} of 11 μM). In another study, (S)-5-fluorowillardiine showed biphasic dose-dependent neurotoxicity in cultural rodent cortical neurons, with EC_{50} values of 0.70 and 170 μM. While in vivo research is sparse, a study in 5-day-old mice injected with the closely related AMPA/kainate agonist (S)-5-bromowillardiine showed cortical and white matter damage. AMPA antagonists reduced the extent of the damage in a dose-dependent fashion.

== Applications in research ==
Radiolabeled 5-fluorowillardiine has been used to study the distribution of ionotropic glutamate receptors in rodent brains. It has also been used to evaluate the effects of various allosteric modulators of the AMPA receptor.

== Chemistry ==
=== Structure and activity ===
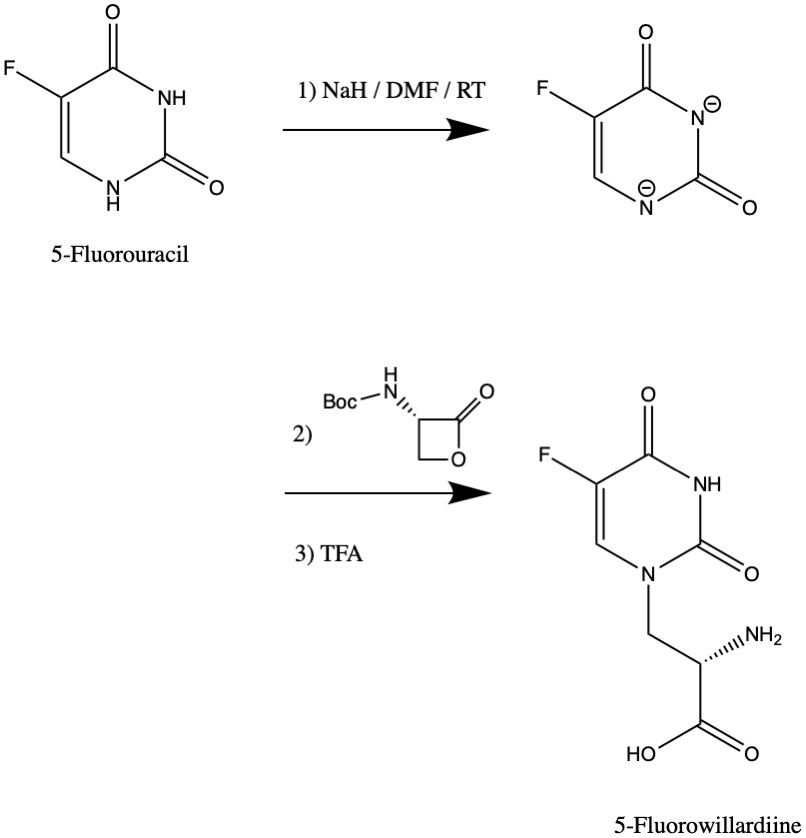
Synthesis of 5-fluorowillardiine

5-Fluorowillardiine is derived from the nitrogenous base uracil found in RNA. It is one member of a family of willardiine compounds, which share uracil or a substituted uracil as an amino acid side chain. 5-Fluorowillardiine exists as two distinct isomers:

- (2R) or D
- (2S) or L

The particularly high affinity of 5-fluorowillardiine for the AMPA receptor is attributed to its fluorine substituent at the 5-position of the ring, which is electron-withdrawing and small enough to not interfere with binding. By contrast, related willardiine derivatives with larger nonpolar electron withdrawing groups exhibit greater affinity for kainate receptors than 5-fluorowillardiine, and less affinity for AMPA receptors.

The binding of 5-fluorowillardiine to the AMPA receptor is driven by entropy when its ring is uncharged. When the ring is deprotonated and has a negative charge, a favorable change in enthalpy primarily drives binding. Because the pKa values of halogenated willardiine derivates are approximately 8 (7.98 for 5-fluorowillardiine), binding is mostly driven by an increase in entropy at physiological pH.

=== Synthesis ===
The synthesis of 5-fluorowillardiine may be achieved by using 5-fluorouracil as a nucleophile to open a specialized lactone in an S_{N}2 reaction. Another straightforward approach is to perform a Strecker amino acid synthesis.
