= Glur2 RNA editing =

Within the science of molecular biology and cell biology, for human genetics, the GRIA2 gene is located on chromosome 4q32-q33. The gene product is the ionotropic AMPA glutamate receptor 2 ( also known as Glur2 or GlurB). The protein belongs to a family of ligand-activated glutamate receptors that are sensitive to alpha-amino-3-hydroxy-5-methyl-4-isoxazole propionate (AMPA). Glutamate receptors function as the main excitatory neurotransmitter at many synapses in the central nervous system. L-glutamate, an excitatory neurotransmitter, binds to the Gria2 resulting in a conformational change. This leads to the opening of the channel converting the chemical signal to an electrical impulse. AMPA receptors (AMPAR) are composed of four subunits, designated as GluR1 (GRIA1), GluR2 (GRIA2), GluR3 (GRIA3), and GluR4(GRIA4) which combine to form tetramers. They are usually heterotrimeric but can be homodimeric. Each AMPAR has four sites to which an agonist (such as L-glutamate) can bind, one for each subunit.[5]

== RNA editing ==
=== Editing type ===
Gria2 pre-mRNA undergoes a type of editing called adenosine-to-inosine (A-to-I) editing. Adenosine deaminases acting on RNA (ADARs) are the RNA editing enzymes responsible for A-to-I editing. ADARs deaminate adenosine bases to inosine bases in a site-specific manner in double-stranded RNA substrates (dsRNA). ADAR2 has been experimentally shown to be the specifically responsible

=== Editing site ===
The pre-mRNA of GRIA2 is modified at amino acid 607, found in the second transmembrane domain of the receptor subunit. This is called the Q/R site.

=== Editing regulation ===
Editing occurs in 100% of transcripts in human brain. Editing levels are lower in other tissues. Deletion analysis determined that editing requires 5' portion of intron B. The predicted minimum fragment required for editing to occur contains inverted repeat structure separated by 120 nucleotides. The inverted repeat contains 3 double stranded elements of 22-23 base pairs with distortion after 15-17 base pairs with mismatched pairs in helical structure 1 and 3 and a bulge in helical structure 2.

== Effects of Rna editing ==
=== Protein structure ===
The genomically encoded GluR2 subunit has a Gln (CAG) at the editing site position. Editing of the pre-mRNA results in conversion to Arg (CGG) being encoded at this position.

=== Protein function ===
Editing alters Ca2+ permeability.

=== Dysfunctional editing ===
GluA2 RNA editing has recently been described to be dysregulated in Alzheimer's disease and the latest research has shown that modulating RNA editing can lead to functional benefits in an Alzheimer mouse model

=== Thiamine (Vitamin B1) deficiency ===
Deficiency of vitamin B1 is correlated with alterations in editing of Glur2 pre-mRNA. Thiamine deficiency leads to mild impairment of oxidative metabolism and regional selective neuronal loss in the central nervous system. An increase in intracellular calcium has been experimentally observed in cultured cortical neurons as a result of lack of thiamine. Deficiency also inhibits editing of the Q/R site of Glur2 thereby increasing the level of unedited Glur2 resulting in increased calcium permeability of Glur2 containing channels.

== External sources ==
- http://darned.ucc.ie/
