= 5-Iodowillardiine =

Names
- IUPAC name (2S)-2-Amino-3-(5-iodo-2,4-dioxopyrimidin-1-yl)propanoic acid

Identifiers
CAS Number	140187-25-3
3D model (JSmol)	Interactive image; Interactive image
ChEMBL	ChEMBL121915
ChemSpider	394358
DrugBank	DB02818
IUPHAR/BPS	4071
PubChem CID	447196
UNII	JA824MLW6G
CompTox Dashboard (EPA)	DTXSID90332246
- InChI: InChI=1S/C7H8IN3O4/c8-3-1-11(2-4(9)6(13)14)7(15)10-5(3)12/h1,4H,2,9H2,(H,13,14)(H,10,12,15)/t4-/m0/s1 Key: AXXYLTBQIQBTES-BYPYZUCNSA-N; InChI=1/C7H8IN3O4/c8-3-1-11(2-4(9)6(13)14)7(15)10-5(3)12/h1,4H,2,9H2,(H,13,14)(H,10,12,15)/t4-/m0/s1 Key: AXXYLTBQIQBTES-BYPYZUCNBL
- SMILES: C1=C(C(=O)NC(=O)N1C[C@@H](C(=O)O)N)I; O=C(O)[C@@H](N)CN1/C=C(/I)C(=O)NC1=O

Properties
Chemical formula	C_{7}H_{8}IN_{3}O_{4}
Molar mass	325.061 g/mol
- Except where otherwise noted, data are given for materials in their standard state (at 25 °C [77 °F], 100 kPa). verify (what is ?) Infobox references

5-Iodowillardiine is a selective agonist for some kainate receptor subunits with only limited effects at AMPA receptors. It activates kainate receptors containing GluK1 (GluR5) or GluK5 (KA2) subunits, but it does not act on GluK2 (GluR6) subunits. It is an excitotoxic neurotoxin in vivo, but has proved highly useful for characterising the subtypes and function of the various kainate receptors in the brain and spinal cord.
