= Chemaxon =

Hungarian cheminformatics software company

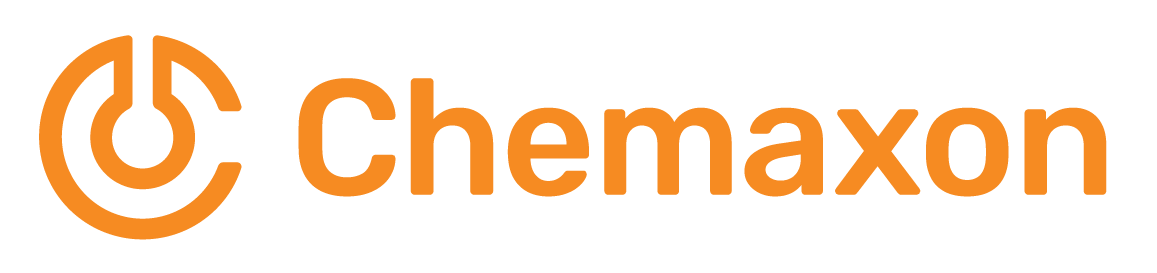
- Company type: Private (subsidiary of Certara, Inc.)
- Industry: Cheminformatics, Bioinformatics
- Founded: February 14, 1998; 28 years ago in Budapest, Hungary
- Founder: Ferenc Csizmadia, Péter Csizmadia
- Headquarters: Budapest, Hungary
- Number of locations: 4 offices; 6 distributors
- Area served: Worldwide
- Products: Chemicalize; JChem Technology; Marvin
- Services: IT consultancy; Hosted services
- Number of employees: 250 (2022)
- Parent: Certara, Inc. (since 2024)
- Website: chemaxon.com

Chemaxon is a Hungarian software company specializing in cheminformatics and bioinformatics solutions. Founded in 1998 in Budapest, the company develops software for chemical structure visualization, database management, and computational chemistry. It serves clients in the pharmaceutical, biotechnology, and agrochemical industries. Since October 2024, Chemaxon has been a subsidiary of Certara, Inc., a US-based biosimulation company.

== History ==
Chemaxon was established in 1998 by Ferenc Csizmadia and Péter Csizmadia with a focus on chemical informatics and software development. Initially providing consulting services, the company soon transitioned to product development, collaborating with universities and research institutions.

In 1999, Chemaxon released Marvin, its first software product, a molecular visualization and editing tool. This was followed by JChem Technology in 2000, which integrated cheminformatics capabilities into database management systems.

By the early 2000s, Chemaxon expanded internationally, establishing offices in Cambridge (US), San Diego, Basel, and Prague. In 2004, the company introduced a free academic license for its software, supporting research and education.

In 2024, Chemaxon was acquired by Certara, Inc. to strengthen Certara's drug discovery software portfolio. The acquisition was completed on October 2, 2024.

== Products ==
Chemaxon provides cheminformatics and bioinformatics software solutions used in drug discovery, chemical research, and data analysis. Its products include:

- Marvin – A molecular editor for drawing and visualizing chemical structures.
- JChem Technology – A suite of tools for chemical database searching, storage, and integration with existing enterprise systems.
- Chemicalize – A cloud-based cheminformatics tool used for chemical structure property predictions.
- Instant JChem – A desktop application for chemical database management and structure searching.
- JChem for Excel – A plugin that integrates cheminformatics tools into Microsoft Excel.

Chemaxon's software supports tasks such as chemical structure prediction, molecular modeling, and virtual screening, and is used by researchers in pharmaceutical and academic settings. The company also developed Markush structure handling capabilities, allowing users to search for patent-protected chemical structures.

== Research and collaboration ==
Chemaxon collaborates with academic institutions and pharmaceutical companies to advance cheminformatics research. It provides free licenses for educational and nonprofit research and contributes to scientific publications. Its tools have been referenced in cheminformatics studies for predicting pKa values and logP values.

== See also ==
- Cheminformatics
- Computational chemistry
- Molecular modeling
- Drug discovery
