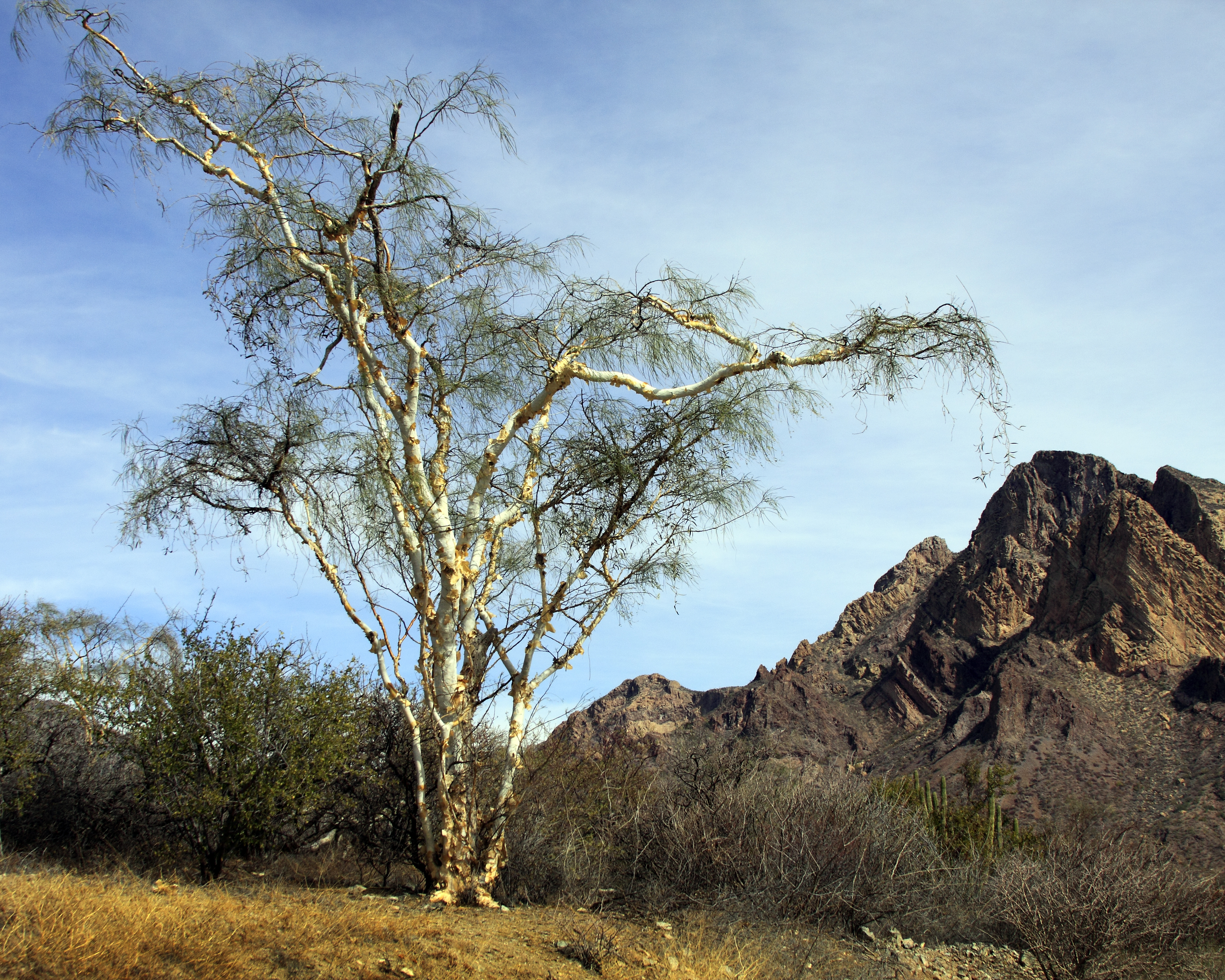

Scientific classification
- Kingdom: Plantae
- Clade: Embryophytes
- Clade: Tracheophytes
- Clade: Spermatophytes
- Clade: Angiosperms
- Clade: Eudicots
- Clade: Rosids
- Order: Fabales
- Family: Fabaceae
- Subfamily: Caesalpinioideae
- Clade: Mimosoid clade
- Genus: Mariosousa
- Species: M. heterophylla

Binomial name
- Mariosousa heterophylla (Rose) Seigler & Ebinger

Synonyms
- Acacia willardiana Rose 1890; Mariosousa willardiana (Rose 1890) Seigler & Ebinger 2006; Prosopis heterophylla Benth. 1846; Senegalia heterophylla (Benth. 1846) Britton & Rose 1928

= Mariosousa heterophylla =

Species of legume

Mariosousa heterophylla, also called the palo blanco tree (which is also applied to Ipomoea arborescens), palo liso, guinola, and Willard acacia, is a normally evergreen mimosoid plant in the genus Mariosousa native to Mexico. The Spanish common name translates into 'white stick', defining its peeling white bark. A compound called willardiine, that acts as an agonist in glutamate receptors, can be isolated from M. heterophylla.

== Description ==
It can grow 10–20 ft or more with a spread of 1/3 to 2/3 the height. It is a very slender tree with few branches as well as leaves. The petiolar-rachis is characteristically long and functions as a cladophyll. it has a white or yellow-colored peeling off bark. The leaves have 5–6 leaflets in the end. It may drop leaves in autumn and winter. The flowers are like catkins, rod or bottle-brush-like, white or light yellow in color. The pods are multichambered, and 3–4 in long specimens. The flowers occur in pale yellow spikes.

== Distribution and habitat ==
The plant is endemic to Sonora (Sonoran Desert), Mexico. It prefers rocky bajadas, slopes and arroyos from 0 to 2,000 feet elevation. It is a popular ornamental tree in arid areas, especially in the southwestern U.S.

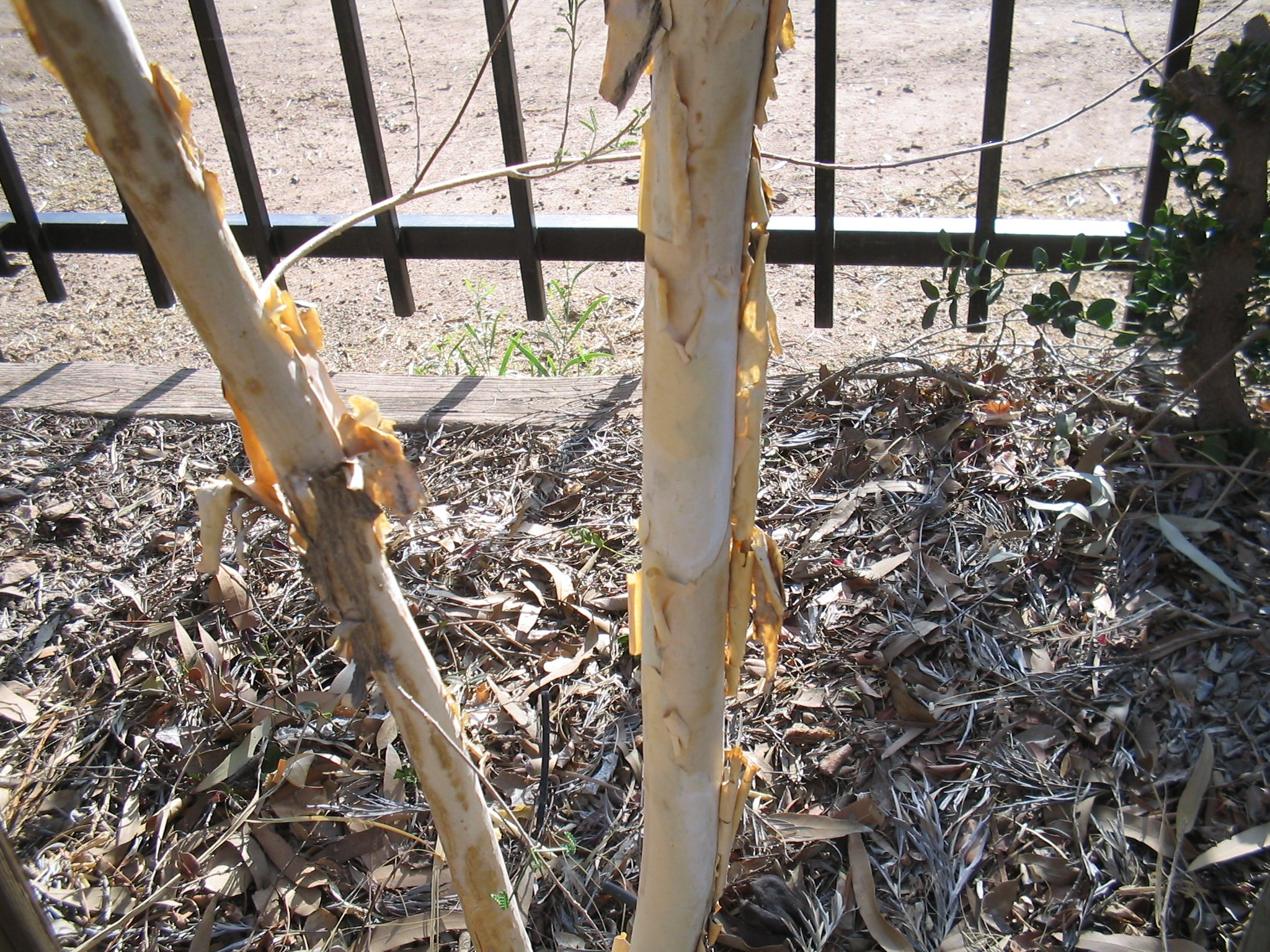
The peeling white bark of Mariosousa heterophylla

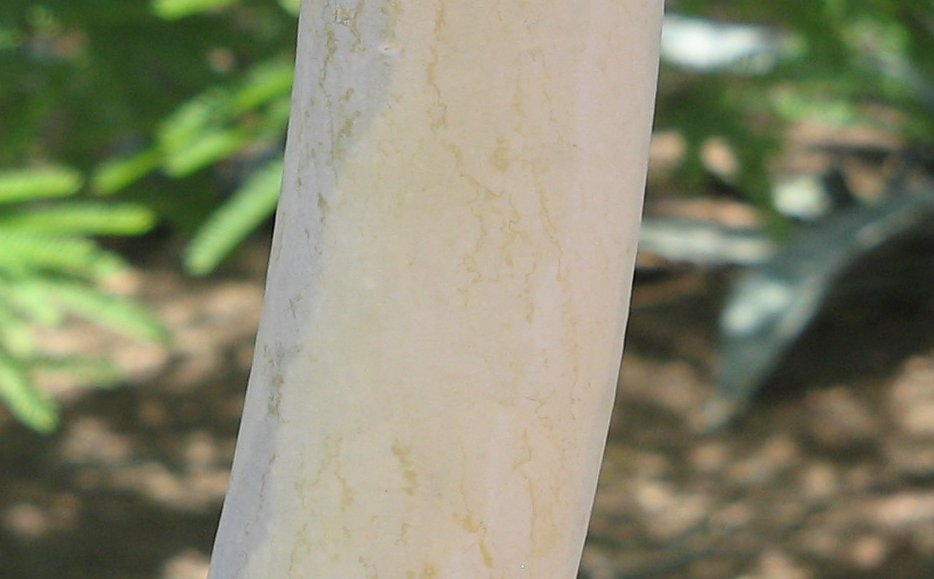
