= Cation channel superfamily =

Family of ion channel proteins

Ion channel (eukaryotic)
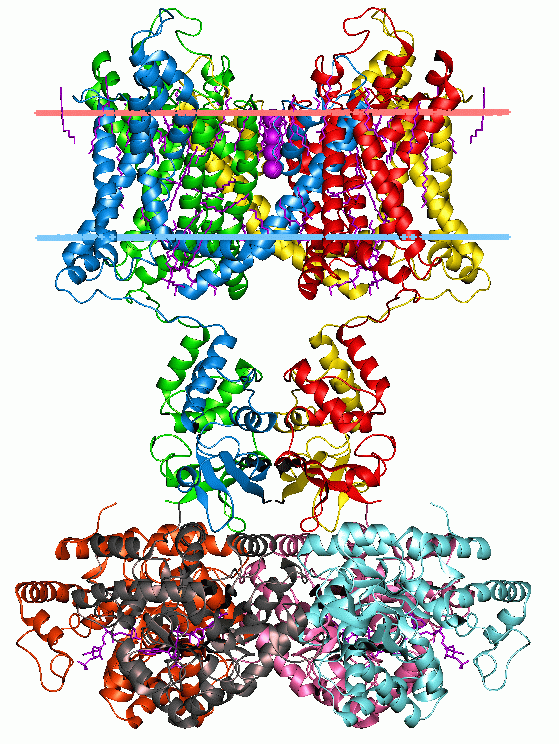
- Potassium channel Kv1.2 (with beta2 auxiliary subunits), structure in a membrane-like environment. Calculated hydrocarbon boundaries of the lipid bilayer are indicated by red and blue dots.

Identifiers
- Symbol: Ion_trans
- Pfam: PF00520
- InterPro: IPR005821
- SCOP2: 1bl8 / SCOPe / SUPFAM
- TCDB: 1.A.1
- OPM superfamily: 8
- OPM protein: 2a79
Available protein structures:
- PDB: 1qg9A:157-176 2a79B:225-409 1ho7A:378-397 1ho2A:378-397 1ujlA:570-611 IPR005821 PF00520 (ECOD; PDBsum)
- AlphaFold: IPR005821; PF00520

Ion channel (bacterial)
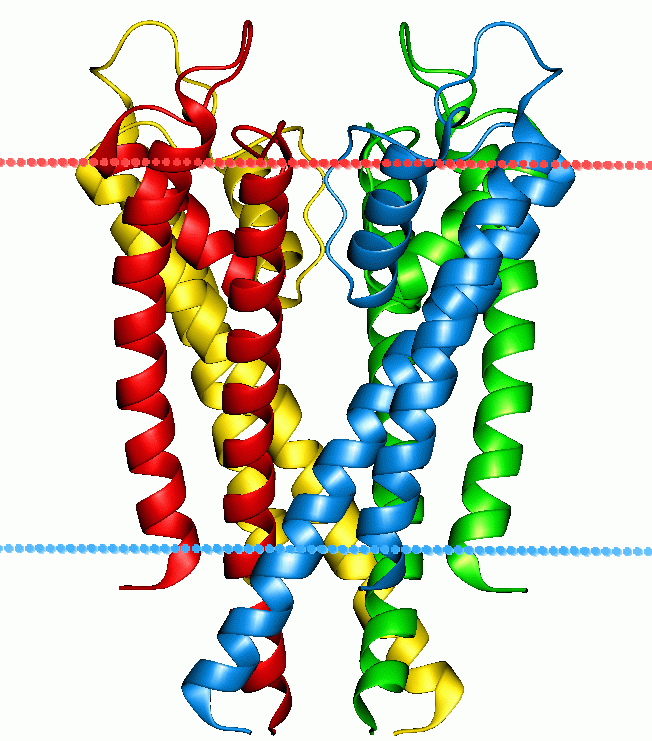
- Potassium channel KcsA. Calculated hydrocarbon boundaries of the lipid bilayer are indicated by red and blue dots.

Identifiers
- Symbol: Ion_trans_2
- Pfam: PF07885
- InterPro: IPR013099
- SCOP2: 1bl8 / SCOPe / SUPFAM
- OPM protein: 1r3j
Available protein structures:
- PDB: 1lnqE:25-100 2a0lB:169-250 1orqC:169-250 1k4cC:34-116 1r3iC:34-116 2bocC:34-116 1j95C:34-116 1r3lC:34-116 1jvmB:34-116 1bl8C:34-116 2a9hD:34-116 1k4dC:34-116 1r3jC:34-116 1r3kC:34-116 2bobC:34-116 1p7bB:77-151 IPR013099 PF07885 (ECOD; PDBsum)
- AlphaFold: IPR013099; PF07885

The transmembrane cation channel superfamily was defined in InterPro and Pfam as the family of tetrameric ion channels. These include the sodium, potassium, calcium, ryanodine receptor, HCN, CNG, CatSper, and TRP channels. This large group of ion channels apparently includes families 1.A.1, 1.A.2, 1.A.3, and 1.A.4 of the TCDB transporter classification.

They are described as minimally having two transmembrane helices flanking a loop which determines the ion selectivity of the channel pore. Many eukaryotic channels have four additional transmembrane helices (TM) (Pfam PF00520), related to or vestigial of voltage gating. The proteins with only two transmembrane helices (Pfam PF07885) are most commonly found in bacteria. This also includes the 2-TM inward-rectifier potassium channels (Pfam PF01007) found primarily in eukaryotes. There are commonly additional regulatory domains which serve to regulate ion conduction and channel gating. The pores may also be homotetramers or heterotetramers; where heterotetramers may be encoded as distinct genes or as multiple pore domains within a single polypeptide. The HVCN1 and Putative tyrosine-protein phosphatase proteins do not contain an expected ion conduction pore domain, but rather have homology only to the voltage sensor domain of voltage gated ion channels.

== Human channels with 6 TM helices ==
=== Cation ===
==== Transient receptor potential ====
===== Canonical =====
- TRPC1; TRPC3; TRPC4; TRPC5; TRPC6; TRPC7

===== Melastatin =====
- TRPM1; TRPM2; TRPM3; TRPM4; TRPM5; TRPM6; TRPM7; TRPM8

===== Vanilloid =====
- TRPV1; TRPV2; TRPV3; TRPV4; TRPV5; TRPV6

===== Mucolipin =====
- MCOLN1; MCOLN2; MCOLN3;

===== Ankyrin =====
- TRPA1

===== TRPP =====
- PKD1L3;

=== Calcium ===
==== Voltage-dependent ====
- CACNA1A; CACNA1B; CACNA1C; CACNA1D; CACNA1E; CACNA1F; CACNA1G; CACNA1H; CACNA1I; CACNA1S

==== Sperm ====
- CATSPER1; CATSPER2; CATSPER3; CATSPER4

==== Ryanodine receptor ====
- RYR1; RYR2; RYR3

=== Potassium ===
==== Voltage-gated potassium ====
===== Delayed rectifier =====
- K_{v}α1.x - Shaker-related: K_{v}1.1 (KCNA1), K_{v}1.2 (KCNA2), K_{v}1.3 (KCNA3), K_{v}1.5 (KCNA5), K_{v}1.6 (KCNA6), K_{v}1.7 (KCNA7), K_{v}1.8 (KCNA10)
- K_{v}α2.x - Shab-related: K_{v}2.1 (KCNB1), K_{v}2.2 (KCNB2)
- K_{v}α3.x - Shaw-related: K_{v}3.1 (KCNC1), K_{v}3.2 (KCNC2)
- K_{v}α7.x: K_{v}7.1 (KCNQ1) - KvLQT1, K_{v}7.2 (KCNQ2), K_{v}7.3 (KCNQ3), K_{v}7.4 (KCNQ4), K_{v}7.5 (KCNQ5)
- K_{v}α10.x: K_{v}10.1 (KCNH1)

===== A-type potassium =====
- K_{v}α1.x - Shaker-related: K_{v}1.4 (KCNA4)
- K_{v}α3.x - Shaw-related: K_{v}3.3 (KCNC3), K_{v}3.4 (KCNC4)
- K_{v}α4.x - Shal-related: K_{v}4.1 (KCND1), K_{v}4.2 (KCND2), K_{v}4.3 (KCND3)

===== Outward-rectifying =====
- K_{v}α10.x: K_{v}10.2 (KCNH5)

===== Inwardly-rectifying =====
- K_{v}α11.x - ether-a-go-go potassium channels: K_{v}11.1 (KCNH2) - hERG, K_{v}11.2 (KCNH6), K_{v}11.3 (KCNH7)

===== Slowly activating =====
- K_{v}α12.x: K_{v}12.1 (KCNH8), K_{v}12.2 (KCNH3), K_{v}12.3 (KCNH4)

===== Modifier/silencer =====
- K_{v}α5.x: K_{v}5.1 (KCNF1)
- K_{v}α6.x: K_{v}6.1 (KCNG1), K_{v}6.2 (KCNG2), K_{v}6.3 (KCNG3), K_{v}6.4 (KCNG4)
- K_{v}α8.x: K_{v}8.1 (KCNV1), K_{v}8.2 (KCNV2)
- K_{v}α9.x: K_{v}9.1 (KCNS1), K_{v}9.2 (KCNS2), K_{v}9.3 (KCNS3)

==== Calcium-activated ====
===== BK =====
- K_{Ca}1.1 (BK, Slo1, Maxi-K, KCNMA1)

===== SK =====
- K_{Ca}2.x: K_{Ca}2.1 (KCNN1) - SK1, K_{Ca}2.2 (KCNN2) - SK2, K_{Ca}2.3 (KCNN3) - SK3
- K_{Ca}3.x: K_{Ca}3.1 (KCNN4) - SK4
- K_{Ca}4.x: K_{Ca}4.1 (KCNT1) - SLACK, K_{Ca}4.2 (KCNT2) - SLICK

===== IK =====
- K_{Ca}3.1 (IKCa1, SK4, KCNN4)

===== Other subfamilies =====
- K_{Ca}5.1 (Slo3, KCNU1)

=== Sodium ===
- NALCN
- SCN1A; SCN2A; SCN2A2; SCN3A; SCN4A; SCN5A; SCN7A; SCN8A; SCN9A; SCN10A; SCN11A
- SLC9A10; SLC9A11

=== Cyclic nucleotide-gated ===
- CNGA1; CNGA2; CNGA3; CNGA4
- CNGB1; CNGB3
- HCN1; HCN2; HCN3; HCN4
- ITPR1; ITPR2; ITPR3

=== Proton ===
- HVCN1

=== Related proteins ===
- TPTE, part of the larger Voltage sensitive phosphatase family

== Human channels with 2 TM helices in each subunit ==
=== Potassium ===
==== Tandem pore domain potassium channel ====
- KCNK1; KCNK2; KCNK3; KCNK4; KCNK5; KCNK6; KCNK7; KCNK9; KCNK10; KCNK12; KCNK13; KCNK15; KCNK16; KCNK17; KCNK18

== Non-human channels ==
=== Two-pore ===
- TPCN1
- TPCN2

=== Pore-only potassium ===
- KcsA

=== Ligand-gated potassium ===
- GluR0

=== Voltage-gated potassium ===
- KvAP

=== Prokaryotic KCa ===
- Kch
- MthK
- TrkA/TrkH
- KtrAB
- GsuK
- TM1088

=== Voltage and cyclic nucleotide gated potassium ===
- MlotiK1

=== Sodium ===
- NaChBac
- NaVAb
- NaVAe1
- NaVAp
- NaVMm

=== Non-selective ===
- NaK

=== Prokaryotic inward-rectifier potassium ===
- KirBac

=== Engineered ===
- NaK2CNG
- NaK2K
