= Potassium channel tetramerisation domain =

K+ channel tetramerisation domain
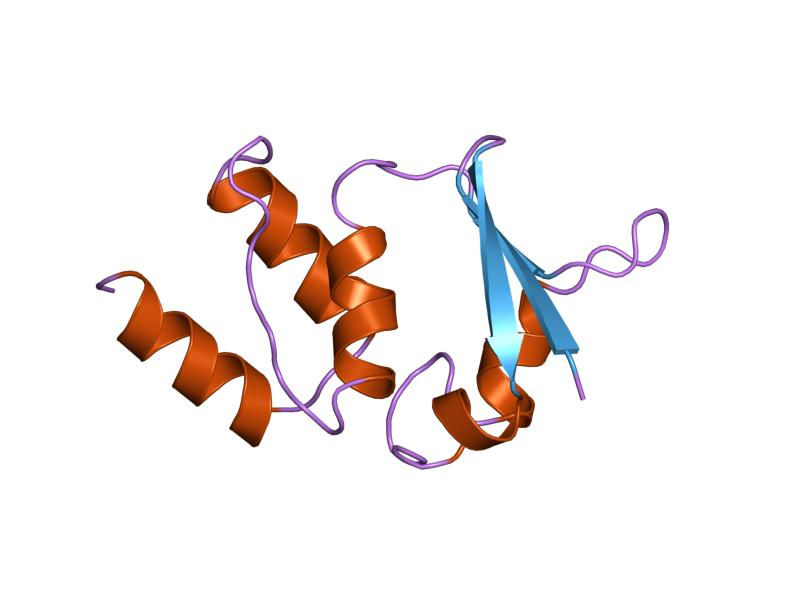

Identifiers
- Symbol: K_tetra
- Pfam: PF02214
- InterPro: IPR003131
- SCOP2: 1t1d / SCOPe / SUPFAM
- OPM superfamily: 8
- OPM protein: 2a79
Available protein structures:
- PDB: 3kvtS:12-102 1nn7A:43-132 1s1gB:42-131 1dsxG:35-119 1qdvB:35-126 1qdwH:35-119 2a79B:35-126 1exbE:39-129 1a68 :68-152 1eofA:68-159 1eodA:68-159 1eoeA:68-159 1t1dA:68-159 IPR003131 PF02214 (ECOD; PDBsum)
- AlphaFold: IPR003131; PF02214

K+ channel tetramerisation domain is the N-terminal, cytoplasmic tetramerisation domain (T1) of voltage-gated K+ channels. It defines molecular determinants for subfamily-specific assembly of alpha-subunits into functional tetrameric channels. It is distantly related to the BTB/POZ domain Pfam PF00651.

== Potassium channels ==
Potassium channels are the most diverse group of the ion channel family. They are important in shaping the action potential, and in neuronal excitability and plasticity. The potassium channel family is composed of several functionally distinct isoforms, which can be broadly separated into 2 groups: the practically non-inactivating 'delayed' group and the rapidly inactivating 'transient' group.

These are all highly similar proteins, with only small amino acid changes causing the diversity of the voltage-dependent gating mechanism, channel conductance and toxin binding properties. Each type of K^{+} channel is activated by different signals and conditions depending on their type of regulation: some open in response to depolarisation of the plasma membrane; others in response to hyperpolarisation or an increase in intracellular calcium concentration; some can be regulated by binding of a transmitter, together with intracellular kinases; while others are regulated by GTP-binding proteins or other second messengers. In eukaryotic cells, K^{+} channels are involved in neural signalling and generation of the cardiac rhythm, act as effectors in signal transduction pathways involving G protein-coupled receptors (GPCRs) and may have a role in target cell lysis by cytotoxic T-lymphocytes. In prokaryotic cells, they play a role in the maintenance of ionic homeostasis.

== Alpha subunits of the channels ==
All K^{+} channels discovered so far possess a core of alpha subunits, each comprising either one or two copies of a highly conserved pore loop domain (P-domain). The P-domain contains the sequence (T/SxxTxGxG), which has been termed the K^{+} selectivity sequence. In families that contain one P-domain, four subunits assemble to form a selective pathway for K^{+} across the membrane. However, it remains unclear how the 2 P-domain subunits assemble to form a selective pore. The functional diversity of these families can arise through homo- or hetero-associations of alpha subunits or association with auxiliary cytoplasmic beta subunits. K^{+} channel subunits containing one pore domain can be assigned into one of two superfamilies: those that possess six transmembrane (TM) domains and those that possess only two TM domains. The six TM domain superfamily can be further subdivided into conserved gene families: the voltage-gated (Kv) channels; the KCNQ channels (originally known as KvLQT channels); the EAG-like K^{+} channels; and three types of calcium (Ca)-activated K^{+} channels (BK, IK and SK). The 2TM domain family comprises inward-rectifying K^{+} channels. In addition, there are K^{+} channel alpha-subunits that possess two P-domains. These are usually highly regulated K^{+} selective leak channels.

The Kv family can be divided into several subfamilies on the basis of sequence similarity and function. Four of these subfamilies, Kv1 (Shaker), Kv2 (Shab), Kv3 (Shaw) and Kv4 (Shal), consist of pore-forming alpha subunits that associate with different types of beta subunit. Each alpha subunit comprises six hydrophobic TM domains with a P-domain between the fifth and sixth, which partially resides in the membrane. The fourth TM domain has positively charged residues at every third residue and acts as a voltage sensor, which triggers the conformational change that opens the channel pore in response to a displacement in membrane potential. More recently, 4 new electrically-silent alpha subunits have been cloned: Kv5 (KCNF), Kv6 (KCNG), Kv8 and Kv9 (KCNS). These subunits do not themselves possess any functional activity, but appear to form heteromeric channels with Kv2 subunits, and thus modulate Shab channel activity. When highly expressed, they inhibit channel activity, but at lower levels show more specific modulatory actions.

== Tetramerization domain ==
The N-terminal, cytoplasmic tetramerization domain (T1) of voltage-gated potassium channels encodes molecular determinants for subfamily-specific assembly of alpha-subunits into functional tetrameric channels. This domain is found in a subset of a larger group of proteins that contain the BTB/POZ domain.

== Human proteins containing this domain ==
BTBD10; KCNA1; KCNA10; KCNA2; KCNA3; KCNA4; KCNA5; KCNA6; KCNA7; KCNB1; KCNB2; KCNC1; KCNC2; KCNC3; KCNC4; KCND1; KCND2; KCND3; KCNF1; KCNG1; KCNG2; KCNG3; KCNG4; KCNRG; KCNS1; KCNS2; KCNS3; KCNV1; KCNV2; KCTD1; KCTD10; KCTD11; KCTD12; KCTD13; KCTD14; KCTD15; KCTD16; KCTD17; KCTD18; KCTD19; KCTD2; KCTD20; KCTD21; KCTD3; KCTD4; KCTD5; KCTD6; KCTD7; KCTD8; KCTD9; SHKBP1; TNFAIP1;
