= Murinotoxin-1 =

Toxin from the orange baboon tarantula

Murinotoxin-1 (MnTx-1)
- Three-dimensional structure of the Murinotoxin-1 (MnTx-1). NMR-derived ribbon representation of MnTx-1, showing the arrangement of its peptide backbone and secondary structural elements: the N-terminus in blue and the C-terminus in red.

Identifiers
- Organism: Pterinochilus murinus
- Symbol: N/A
- Orthologs: OMA: entry
- PDB: 9JGG
- UniProt: C0HMD2
Search for
- Structures: Swiss-model
- Domains: InterPro

Murinotoxin-1
Identifiers
3D model (JSmol)	Interactive image
- InChI: InChI=1S/C166H278N50O43S6/c1-10-90(6)131-158(251)197-103(45-19-28-66-173)140(233)192-106(56-59-129(225)226)136(229)184-79-126(222)187-99(41-15-24-62-169)137(230)200-111(76-94-77-182-97-39-12-11-37-95(94)97)147(240)207-118-87-265-264-86-117(152(245)211-133(93(9)219)160(253)198-105(47-21-30-68-175)144(237)208-130(89(4)5)165(258)259)204-141(234)101(43-17-26-64-171)190-138(231)100(42-16-25-63-170)191-142(235)107(54-57-124(177)220)193-139(232)102(44-18-27-65-172)195-154(247)121-51-35-73-215(121)163(256)112(81-217)202-153(246)119-49-32-70-212(119)128(224)80-185-135(228)98(40-14-23-61-168)189-148(241)114-83-262-263-85-116(206-157(250)120-50-33-71-213(120)161(254)91(7)186-159(252)132(92(8)218)210-145(238)104(46-20-29-67-174)196-155(248)122-52-36-74-216(122)164(118)257)150(243)205-115(84-261-260-82-113(151(244)209-131)188-127(223)78-183-134(227)96(176)38-13-22-60-167)149(242)199-109(48-31-69-181-166(179)180)162(255)214-72-34-53-123(214)156(249)201-110(75-88(2)3)146(239)194-108(143(236)203-114)55-58-125(178)221/h11-12,37,39,77,88-93,96,98-123,130-133,182,217-219H,10,13-36,38,40-76,78-87,167-176H2,1-9H3,(H2,177,220)(H2,178,221)(H,183,227)(H,184,229)(H,185,228)(H,186,252)(H,187,222)(H,188,223)(H,189,241)(H,190,231)(H,191,235)(H,192,233)(H,193,232)(H,194,239)(H,195,247)(H,196,248)(H,197,251)(H,198,253)(H,199,242)(H,200,230)(H,201,249)(H,202,246)(H,203,236)(H,204,234)(H,205,243)(H,206,250)(H,207,240)(H,208,237)(H,209,244)(H,210,238)(H,211,245)(H,225,226)(H,258,259)(H4,179,180,181)/t90-,91-,92+,93+,96-,98-,99-,100-,101-,102-,103-,104-,105-,106-,107-,108-,109-,110-,111-,112-,113-,114-,115-,116-,117-,118-,119-,120-,121-,122-,123-,130-,131-,132-,133-/m0/s1 Key: XUWFZNDAWLFCJK-DYQQGBNOSA-N
- SMILES: N[C@@]([H])(CCCCN)C(=O)NCC(=O)N[C@@]([H])(CS3)C(=O)N[C@@]([H])([C@]([H])(CC)C)C(=O)N[C@@]([H])(CCCCN)C(=O)N[C@@]([H])(CCC(=O)O)C(=O)NCC(=O)N[C@@]([H])(CCCCN)C(=O)N[C@@]([H])(CC(=CN2)C1=C2C=CC=C1)C(=O)N[C@@]([H])(CS4)C(=O)N1[C@@]([H])(CCC1)C(=O)N[C@@]([H])(CCCCN)C(=O)N[C@@]([H])([C@]([H])(O)C)C(=O)N[C@@]([H])(C)C(=O)N1[C@@]([H])(CCC1)C(=O)N[C@@]([H])(CS5)C(=O)N[C@@]([H])(CS3)C(=O)N[C@@]([H])(CCCNC(=N)N)C(=O)N1[C@@]([H])(CCC1)C(=O)N[C@@]([H])(CC(C)C)C(=O)N[C@@]([H])(CCC(=O)N)C(=O)N[C@@]([H])(CS5)C(=O)N[C@@]([H])(CCCCN)C(=O)NCC(=O)N1[C@@]([H])(CCC1)C(=O)N[C@@]([H])(CO)C(=O)N1[C@@]([H])(CCC1)C(=O)N[C@@]([H])(CCCCN)C(=O)N[C@@]([H])(CCC(=O)N)C(=O)N[C@@]([H])(CCCCN)C(=O)N[C@@]([H])(CCCCN)C(=O)N[C@@]([H])(CS4)C(=O)N[C@@]([H])([C@]([H])(O)C)C(=O)N[C@@]([H])(CCCCN)C(=O)N[C@@]([H])(C(C)C)C(=O)O
- Except where otherwise noted, data are given for materials in their standard state (at 25 °C [77 °F], 100 kPa). Infobox references

Murinotoxin-1 (MnTx-1) is a peptide neurotoxin derived from the orange baboon tarantula (Pterinochilus murinus) which selectively inhibits Shaker-related voltage-gated potassium (K_{v}1) channels by blocking ion conduction through their pores.

== Etymology ==
MnTx-1 is the abbreviated name for murinotoxin-1, formally known as 𝜅_{1}-theraphotoxin-Pmu3a. The peptide toxin is named after its source species; Pterinochilus murinus. The abbreviation consists of "Mn" (murino); "Tx" (toxin); number 1 distinguishes it from MnTx-1.

== Sources ==
MnTx-1 was first isolated by Kuzmenkov et al. (2025) from the venom of the orange baboon tarantula (Pterinochilus murinus), a species native to Central, East, and South Africa. The toxin was identified through fractionation and analysis of the spider’s venom and later characterized using biochemical and electrophysiological techniques.

== Chemistry ==
Amino acid sequence
Peptide	Sequence	Length
MnTx-1	KGCIKEGKWCPKTAPCCRPLQCKGPSPKQKKCTKV	35 amino acids

The peptide contains six cysteine residues that form three intramolecular disulfide bridges (C3-C17; C10-C32; C16-C22), which are crucial for the stability of its three-dimensional structure. The structural arrangement of the MnTx-1 is characterized by the Disulfide-Reined Hairpin (DRH) fold, identified using nuclear magnetic resonance (NMR). This differs from the conventional inhibitor cystine knot (ICK) normally found in spider toxins. The surface of MnTx-1 is mostly positively-charged and contains both hydrophilic and hydrophobic regions, giving the peptide an amphipathic structure.

== Target ==
MnTx-1 selectively targets Shaker-related voltage-gated potassium channels from the K_{v}1 family. Electrophysiological experiments have demonstrated inhibition of the K_{v}1.1, K_{v}1.2, K_{v}1.3, K_{v}1.6, and K_{v}1.7 channels, with the highest potency observed for K_{v}1.1 and K_{v}1.6.

== Mode of action ==
Inhibition of Shaker-type channels, with selectivity for K_{v}1.1 and K_{v}1.6, and subsequent K^{+} conduction is achieved through high affinity occlusion of the channel. With experimental support as a pore blocker, the specific mechanism by which MnTx-1 binds to and physically blocks K^{+} conduction has not been identified.

== Toxicity/affinity ==
The median lethal dose (LD_{50}) has not been studied with MnTx-1, though the half-maximal inhibitory concentration (IC_{50}) helps understand MnTx-1 affinity for K_{v}1 channels. Published IC_{50} values indicate high potency where only small levels of MnTx-1 are necessary for specific K_{v}1 activity blockage.

IC_{50} values for K_{v}1-mediated currents
	IC_{50}
K_{v}1.1	1.1 ± 0.6 nM
K_{v}1.6	4.4 ± 1.0 nM

However, whole-organism toxicity cannot be attributed to inhibition of Shaker-type K^{+} channels by MnTx-1 alone as venom from the orange baboon tarantula contains many chemical components. Treatment of symptoms thus remains general for a bite from the spider versus specific anti-MnTx-1 treatments. Bites from P.murinus have been reported to cause generalised cramps, swelling, muscle spasms, and pain.
