= BscTx3 =

BcsTx3
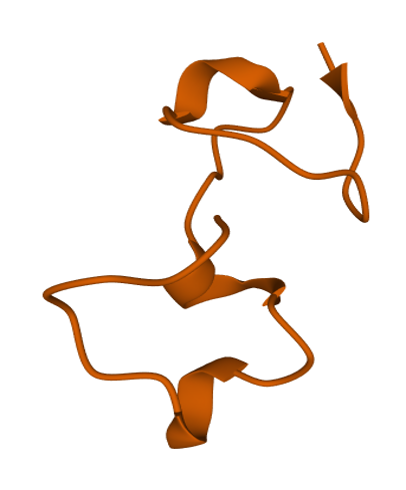
- Predicted Structure of BcsTx3 from Swiss Model predictor

Identifiers
- Organism: Bunodosoma caissarum
- Symbol: N/A
- UniProt: C0HJC4
Search for
- Structures: Swiss-model
- Domains: InterPro

BcsTx3, also known as Kappa-actitoxin-Bsc4a, is a neurotoxin that blocks voltage-gated potassium channel (Kv1/KCNA). It is purified from the venom of Bunodosoma caissarum.

== Source ==
This toxin is derived from the sea anemone Bunodosoma caissarum of the phylum Cnidaria.

== Structure ==
Biochemical analysis of the toxin reveals that it is a small single-chain peptide consisting of 50 amino acids.

== Mode of Action ==
It selectively inhibits a variety of voltage-gated potassium channels. Electrophysiological experimentation reveals that BcsTx3 is able to block voltage-gated potassium channels Kv1.1, Kv1.2, Kv1.3, Kv1.6 as well as Drosophila Shaker IR channels. The IC50 values for these channels are 172.59 nM for Kv1.2/KCNA2, 2245.93 nM for Kv1.6/KCNA6, 1006.48 nM for human Kv1.3/KCNA3, and 94.25 nM for the Drosophila Shaker IR channels. Competitive interaction with another voltage-gated potassium channel blocker, TEA, suggests that both toxins bind to the same site on the Shaker IR Kv channel. It can thus be concluded that BcsTx3, like TEA, binds to the outside mouth of the pore, subsequently obstructing the flow of K^{+} ions.

== Homology ==
Unlike the four subtypes of previously identified sea anemone voltage-gated potassium channel toxins, BcsTx3 exhibits 4 crosslinking disulphide bridges instead of 2 or 3. It is therefore suggested that BcsTx3, as well as two other relatively homologous sea anemone toxins that exhibit this unique structure (nvePTx1 and msePTx1), be classified as a type 5 sea anemone Kv toxin subfamily.
