= Ether‐à‐go‐go potassium channel =

Type of potassium channel

An ether‐à‐go‐go potassium channel is a potassium channel which is inwardly-rectifying and voltage-gated.

They are named after the ether‐à‐go‐go gene, which codes for one such channel in the fruit fly Drosophila melanogaster.

Examples include hERG, KCNH6, and KCNH7.
