= Retinal cone dystrophy 3B =

- Specialty: Medical genetics
- Symptoms: Ocular abnormalities
- Complications: Vision impairment, colorblindness
- Usual onset: Mid/late childhood-early adulthood
- Duration: Life-long (most of the symptoms)
- Causes: Genetic mutation
- Prevention: none
- Frequency: very rare, only 34 cases have been described worldwide.
- Deaths: -

Retinal cone dystrophy 3B is a very rare genetic disorder which is characterized by ocular anomalies. Approximately 34 cases from 20 families across the world have been described in medical literature (OMIM). This disorder is associated with autosomal recessive mutations in the KCNV2 and PDE6H genes.

== Presentation ==
People with the disorder often start showing symptoms when they are in their mid-late childhood-early adulthood, these symptoms are usually the following:

- Central scotoma
- Decreased visual acuity
- Photophobia
- Severe dyschromatopsia

Additional features include nystagmus.

== Etymology ==
This disorder was discovered by Michaelides et al., when they described ten patients from seven families across the world. These patients had retinal cone dystrophy, abnormally high rod responses, poor central vision, photophobia, mild nystagmus (in three patients), variable degrees of nearsightedness and astigmatism, progressive loss of visual acuity and color vision, reduced color discrimination, and other ocular symptoms. The families came from the United Kingdom, Somalia, Pakistan, Iran, and the United Arab Emirates.
