= HVCN1 =

Protein-coding gene in the species Homo sapiens

Identifiers
- Aliases: HVCN1, HV1, VSOP, hydrogen voltage gated channel 1
- External IDs: OMIM: 611227; MGI: 1921346; GeneCards: HVCN1
Available structures
PDB	Ortholog search: PDBe RCSB
PDB	List of PDB id codes 3A2A

Gene location (Human)
Chr.	Chromosome 12 (human)
Band	12q24.11	Start	110,627,841 bp
Band	12q24.11	End	110,704,950 bp

Gene location (Mouse)
Chr.	Chromosome 5 (mouse)
Band	5|5 F	Start	122,344,867 bp
Band	5|5 F	End	122,380,360 bp
RNA expression pattern
Bgee	Human / Mouse (ortholog); Top expressed in: white blood cell; monocyte; granulocyte; lymph node; mucosa of ileum; blood; left testis; spleen; right testis; appendix / Top expressed in: mesenteric lymph nodes; granulocyte; spleen; blood; zygote; secondary oocyte; subcutaneous adipose tissue; tibiofemoral joint; bone marrow; primary oocyte; More reference expression data
BioGPS	n/a
Gene ontology
Molecular function	ion channel activity; voltage-gated cation channel activity; voltage-gated ion channel activity; voltage-gated proton channel activity; identical protein binding
Cellular component	membrane; integral component of membrane; plasma membrane; secretory granule membrane; specific granule membrane; integral component of plasma membrane; phagocytic vesicle membrane
Biological process	transmembrane transport; regulation of ion transmembrane transport; cellular response to pH; response to zinc ion; ion transport; cellular response to zinc ion; sperm-egg recognition; response to pH; neutrophil degranulation; proton transmembrane transport; cell redox homeostasis
Sources:Amigo / QuickGO
Orthologs
Databases	NCBI: entry; OMA: entry
Species	Human	Mouse
Entrez	84329	74096
Ensembl	ENSG00000122986	ENSMUSG00000064267
UniProt	Q96D96	Q3U2S8
RefSeq (mRNA)	NM_001040107; NM_001256413; NM_032369	NM_001042489; NM_028752; NM_001359454
RefSeq (protein)	NP_001035196; NP_001243342; NP_115745	NP_001035954; NP_083028; NP_001346383
Location (UCSC)	Chr 12: 110.63 – 110.7 Mb	Chr 5: 122.34 – 122.38 Mb
PubMed search
- Wikidata
View/Edit Human	View/Edit Mouse

Voltage-gated hydrogen channel 1 is a protein that in humans is encoded by the HVCN1 gene.

Voltage-gated hydrogen channel 1 is a voltage-gated proton channel that has been shown to allow proton transport into phagosomes and out of many types of cells including spermatozoa, electrically excitable cells and respiratory epithelial cells. The proton-conducting HVCN1 channel has only transmembrane domains corresponding to the S1-S4 voltage sensing domains (VSD) of voltage-gated potassium channels and voltage-gated sodium channels. Molecular simulation is consistent with a water-filled pore that can function as a "water wire" for allowing hydrogen bonded H^{+} to cross the membrane. However, mutation of Asp112 in human Hv1 results in anion permeation, suggesting that obligatory protonation of Asp produces proton selectivity. Quantum mechanical calculations show that the Asp-Arg interaction can produce proton selective permeation. The HVCN1 protein has been shown to exist as a dimer with two functioning pores. Like other VSD channels, HVCN1 channels conduct ions about 1000-fold slower than channels formed by tetrameric S5-S6 central pores.

== As a drug target ==
Small molecule inhibitors of the HVCN1 channel are being developed as chemotherapeutics and anti-inflammatory agents.
