= KCNAB1 =

Protein-coding gene in the species Homo sapiens

Identifiers
- Aliases: KCNAB1, AKR6A3, KCNA1B, KV-BETA-1, Kvb1.3, hKvBeta3, hKvb3, potassium voltage-gated channel subfamily A member regulatory beta subunit 1, potassium voltage-gated channel subfamily A regulatory beta subunit 1
- External IDs: OMIM: 601141; MGI: 109155; GeneCards: KCNAB1

Gene location (Human)
Chr.	Chromosome 3 (human)
Band	3q25.31	Start	156,037,701 bp
Band	3q25.31	End	156,539,138 bp

Gene location (Mouse)
Chr.	Chromosome 3 (mouse)
Band	3 E1|3 30.15 cM	Start	64,856,617 bp
Band	3 E1|3 30.15 cM	End	65,285,644 bp
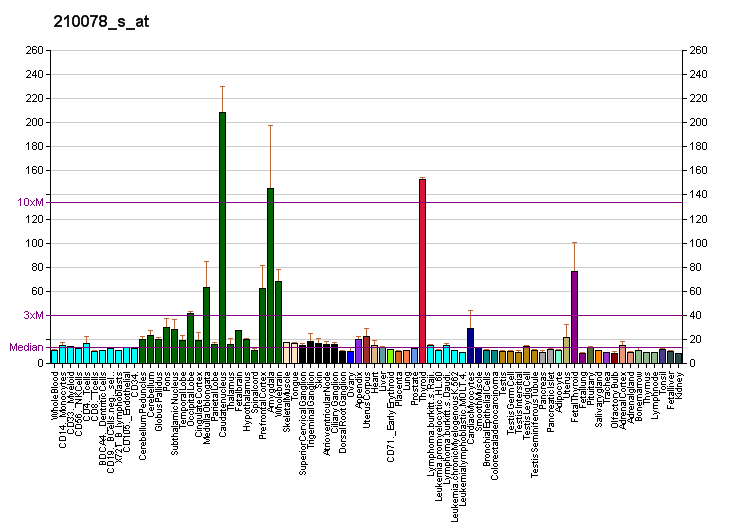

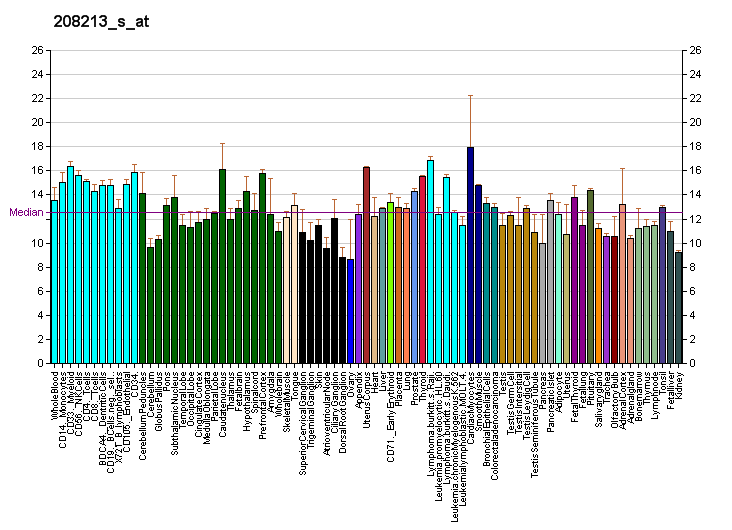

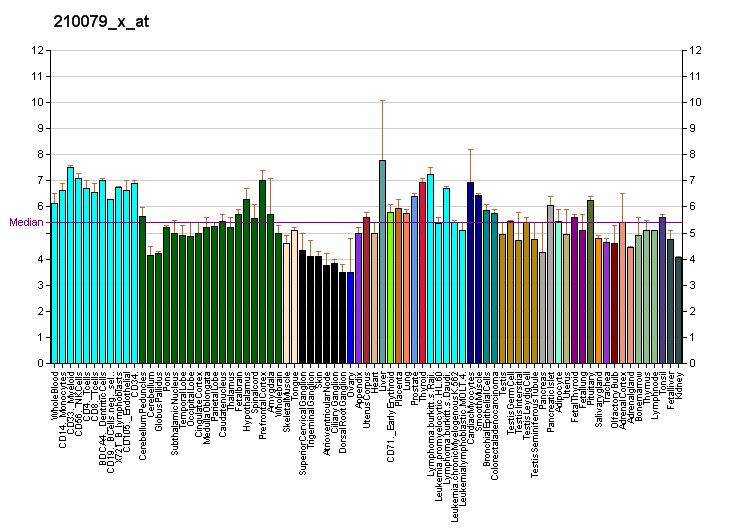
RNA expression pattern
Bgee	Human / Mouse (ortholog); Top expressed in: external globus pallidus; tibial arteries; urethra; putamen; saphenous vein; caudate nucleus; Brodmann area 23; Region I of hippocampus proper; nucleus accumbens; tail of epididymis / Top expressed in: olfactory tubercle; facial motor nucleus; medial dorsal nucleus; nucleus accumbens; globus pallidus; dentate gyrus of hippocampal formation granule cell; lobe of cerebellum; superior frontal gyrus; Region I of hippocampus proper; anterior horn of spinal cord; More reference expression data
BioGPS	More reference expression data
Gene ontology
Molecular function	aldo-keto reductase (NADP) activity; voltage-gated ion channel activity; potassium channel regulator activity; NADPH binding; voltage-gated potassium channel activity; oxidoreductase activity; protein domain specific binding; transmembrane transporter binding
Cellular component	cytoplasm; integral component of membrane; cytosol; perikaryon; membrane; extrinsic component of cytoplasmic side of plasma membrane; plasma membrane; axon; soma; proximal dendrite; potassium channel complex; dendrite cytoplasm; juxtaparanode region of axon; voltage-gated potassium channel complex
Biological process	diaphragm development; regulation of ion transmembrane transport; ion transport; potassium ion transport; development of the heart; brain development; regulation of delayed rectifier potassium channel activity; transmembrane transport; regulation of potassium ion transmembrane transporter activity; potassium ion transmembrane transport; learning or memory; myoblast differentiation; skeletal muscle tissue development; regulation of potassium ion transmembrane transport; negative regulation of delayed rectifier potassium channel activity; negative regulation of voltage-gated potassium channel activity; ion transmembrane transport
Sources:Amigo / QuickGO
Orthologs
Databases	NCBI: entry; OMA: entry
Species	Human	Mouse
Entrez	7881	16497
Ensembl	ENSG00000169282	ENSMUSG00000027827
UniProt	Q14722; Q5MJQ3	P63143
RefSeq (mRNA)	NM_001308217; NM_001308222; NM_003471; NM_172159; NM_172160	NM_001289450; NM_010597; NM_001357358
RefSeq (protein)	NP_001295146; NP_001295151; NP_003462; NP_751891; NP_751892 NP_001295151.1	NP_001276379; NP_034727; NP_001344287
Location (UCSC)	Chr 3: 156.04 – 156.54 Mb	Chr 3: 64.86 – 65.29 Mb
PubMed search
- Wikidata
View/Edit Human	View/Edit Mouse

Voltage-gated potassium channel subunit beta-1 is a protein that in humans is encoded by the KCNAB1 gene.

Potassium channels represent the most complex class of voltage-gated ion channels from both functional and structural standpoints. Their diverse functions include regulating neurotransmitter release, heart rate, insulin secretion, neuronal excitability, epithelial electrolyte transport, smooth muscle contraction, and cell volume. Four sequence-related potassium channel genes - shaker, shaw, shab, and shal - have been identified in Drosophila, and each has been shown to have human homolog(s). This gene encodes a member of the potassium channel, voltage-gated, shaker-related subfamily. This member includes three distinct isoforms that are encoded by three alternatively spliced transcript variants of this gene. These three isoforms are beta subunits, which form heteromultimeric complex with alpha subunits and modulate the activity of the pore-forming alpha subunits.

== See also ==
- Voltage-gated potassium channel
