= Voltage-gated potassium channel database =

Database of voltage-gated potassium channels

VKCDB

Content
- Description: Voltage-gated potassium channel database.

Contact
- Research center: University of Alberta
- Laboratory: Department of Biological Sciences
- Authors: Bin Li
- Primary citation: Li & al. (2004)
- Release date: 2004

Access
- Website: http://vkcdb.biology.ualberta.ca

VKCDB (Voltage-gated potassium Channel DataBase) is a database of functional data about the voltage-gated potassium channels.

== See also ==
- Voltage-gated potassium channel
