= KCNAB3 =

Protein-coding gene in the species Homo sapiens

Identifiers
- Aliases: KCNAB3, AKR6A9, KCNA3.1B, KCNA3B, KV-BETA-3, potassium voltage-gated channel subfamily A regulatory beta subunit 3
- External IDs: OMIM: 604111; MGI: 1336208; GeneCards: KCNAB3

Gene location (Human)
Chr.	Chromosome 17 (human)
Band	17p13.1	Start	7,921,859 bp
Band	17p13.1	End	7,929,856 bp

Gene location (Mouse)
Chr.	Chromosome 11 (mouse)
Band	11|11 B3	Start	69,217,084 bp
Band	11|11 B3	End	69,223,868 bp
RNA expression pattern
Bgee	Human / Mouse (ortholog); Top expressed in: right hemisphere of cerebellum; body of uterus; ventricular zone; right frontal lobe; ganglionic eminence; anterior cingulate cortex; left uterine tube; granulocyte; Brodmann area 9; prefrontal cortex / Top expressed in: inferior colliculi; lumbar subsegment of spinal cord; primary visual cortex; superior frontal gyrus; cerebellar cortex; neural layer of retina; medial vestibular nucleus; medial geniculate nucleus; deep cerebellar nuclei; lateral geniculate nucleus; More reference expression data
BioGPS	n/a
Gene ontology
Molecular function	voltage-gated potassium channel activity; potassium channel regulator activity; voltage-gated ion channel activity
Cellular component	cytoplasm; integral component of membrane; plasma membrane
Biological process	potassium ion transport; regulation of ion transmembrane transport; ion transport; potassium ion transmembrane transport; ion transmembrane transport
Sources:Amigo / QuickGO
Orthologs
Databases	NCBI: entry; OMA: entry
Species	Human	Mouse
Entrez	9196	16499
Ensembl	ENSG00000170049	ENSMUSG00000018470
UniProt	O43448	P97382
RefSeq (mRNA)	NM_004732	NM_010599
RefSeq (protein)	NP_004723	n/a
Location (UCSC)	Chr 17: 7.92 – 7.93 Mb	Chr 11: 69.22 – 69.22 Mb
PubMed search
- Wikidata
View/Edit Human	View/Edit Mouse

Voltage-gated potassium channel subunit beta-3 is a protein that in humans is encoded by the KCNAB3 gene. The protein encoded by this gene is a voltage-gated potassium channel beta subunit.
