= KCNT2 =

Protein found in humans

Identifiers
- Aliases: KCNT2, KCa4.2, SLICK, SLO2.1, potassium sodium-activated channel subfamily T member 2, EIEE57, DEE57
- External IDs: OMIM: 610044; MGI: 3036273; GeneCards: KCNT2

Gene location (Human)
Chr.	Chromosome 1 (human)
Band	1q31.3	Start	196,225,779 bp
Band	1q31.3	End	196,609,225 bp

Gene location (Mouse)
Chr.	Chromosome 1 (mouse)
Band	1|1 F	Start	140,173,896 bp
Band	1|1 F	End	140,539,805 bp
RNA expression pattern
Bgee	Human / Mouse (ortholog); Top expressed in: parietal pleura; endothelial cell; cartilage tissue; Brodmann area 23; Brodmann area 46; middle temporal gyrus; germinal epithelium; Achilles tendon; visceral pleura; cardiac muscle tissue of right atrium / Top expressed in: aortic valve; prefrontal cortex; vas deferens; primary motor cortex; ascending aorta; medial dorsal nucleus; lateral septal nucleus; cingulate gyrus; dentate gyrus; subdivision of hippocampus; More reference expression data
BioGPS	n/a
Gene ontology
Molecular function	voltage-gated potassium channel activity; ATP binding; nucleotide binding; potassium channel activity; calcium-activated potassium channel activity; intracellular sodium activated potassium channel activity; outward rectifier potassium channel activity; chloride-activated potassium channel activity
Cellular component	voltage-gated potassium channel complex; integral component of membrane; plasma membrane; membrane
Biological process	potassium ion transmembrane transport; potassium ion transport; ion transport; regulation of membrane potential; potassium ion export across plasma membrane
Sources:Amigo / QuickGO
Orthologs
Databases	NCBI: entry; OMA: entry
Species	Human	Mouse
Entrez	343450	240776
Ensembl	ENSG00000162687	ENSMUSG00000052726
UniProt	Q6UVM3	n/a
RefSeq (mRNA)	NM_001287819; NM_001287820; NM_198503	NM_001081027
RefSeq (protein)	NP_001274748; NP_001274749; NP_940905	n/a
Location (UCSC)	Chr 1: 196.23 – 196.61 Mb	Chr 1: 140.17 – 140.54 Mb
PubMed search
- Wikidata
View/Edit Human	View/Edit Mouse

Potassium channel subfamily T, member 2, also known as KCNT2, is a human gene that encodes the K_{Na} protein. KCNT2, also known as the Slick channel (sequence like an intermediate calcium channel) is an outwardly rectifying potassium channel activated by internal raises in sodium or chloride ions.

== See also ==
- SK channel
- Voltage-gated potassium channel
