= KCNRG =

Protein-coding gene in the species Homo sapiens

Identifiers
- Aliases: KCNRG, DLTET, potassium channel regulator
- External IDs: OMIM: 607947; MGI: 2685591; GeneCards: KCNRG

Gene location (Human)
Chr.	Chromosome 13 (human)
Band	13q14.2	Start	50,015,254 bp
Band	13q14.2	End	50,020,922 bp

Gene location (Mouse)
Chr.	Chromosome 14 (mouse)
Band	14|14 D1	Start	61,844,906 bp
Band	14|14 D1	End	61,850,275 bp
RNA expression pattern
Bgee	Human / Mouse (ortholog); Top expressed in: right uterine tube; olfactory zone of nasal mucosa; epithelium of colon; endometrium; stromal cell of endometrium; sural nerve; right lung; corpus callosum; ventricular zone; Achilles tendon / Top expressed in: blastocyst; granulocyte; embryo; morula; lung; ganglionic eminence; ovary; bone marrow; thymus; ventricular zone; More reference expression data
BioGPS	n/a
Gene ontology
Molecular function	protein binding; identical protein binding
Cellular component	endoplasmic reticulum
Biological process	protein homooligomerization; negative regulation of delayed rectifier potassium channel activity
Sources:Amigo / QuickGO
Orthologs
Databases	NCBI: entry; OMA: entry
Species	Human	Mouse
Entrez	283518	328424
Ensembl	ENSG00000198553	ENSMUSG00000046168
UniProt	Q8N5I3	Q2TUM3
RefSeq (mRNA)	NM_199464; NM_173605	NM_001039105; NM_206974
RefSeq (protein)	NP_775876; NP_955751	NP_001034194; NP_996857
Location (UCSC)	Chr 13: 50.02 – 50.02 Mb	Chr 14: 61.84 – 61.85 Mb
PubMed search
- Wikidata
View/Edit Human	View/Edit Mouse

Potassium channel regulator, also known as KCNRG, is a protein which in humans is encoded by theKCNRG gene.

== Function ==
KCNRG is a soluble protein with characteristics suggesting it forms hetero-tetramers with voltage-gated K^{+} channels and inhibits their function.

== Clinical significance ==
KCNRG has been found to be predominantly expressed in lung tissue. Additionally, KCNRG transcripts are also found in liver and some other tissues, but in lower extent. Researchers at Uppsala University have found that KCNRG is found in the lower lung and constitutes an autoantigen in a rare disorder named autoimmune polyendocrine syndrome type 1 (APS1). As a subset of patients with APS1 suffer from respiratory disease, an autoimmune reaction against KCNRG may explain the respiratory disease in these patients. KCNRG may also be connected to common nonfatal diseases like asthma and chronic bronchitis.
