= KCTD15 =

Protein-coding gene in the species Homo sapiens

Identifiers
- Aliases: KCTD15, potassium channel tetramerization domain containing 15
- External IDs: OMIM: 615240; MGI: 2385276; GeneCards: KCTD15

Gene location (Human)
Chr.	Chromosome 19 (human)
Band	19q13.11	Start	33,795,933 bp
Band	19q13.11	End	33,815,763 bp

Gene location (Mouse)
Chr.	Chromosome 7 (mouse)
Band	7|7 B1- B2	Start	34,338,439 bp
Band	7|7 B1- B2	End	34,356,157 bp
RNA expression pattern
Bgee	Human / Mouse (ortholog); Top expressed in: ventricular zone; ganglionic eminence; left uterine tube; skin of hip; skin of abdomen; right coronary artery; body of uterus; skin of leg; ectocervix; human penis / Top expressed in: otic vesicle; hand; lip; foot; triceps brachii muscle; vastus lateralis muscle; medial head of gastrocnemius muscle; sternocleidomastoid muscle; skeletal muscle tissue; temporal muscle; More reference expression data
BioGPS	n/a
Orthologs
Databases	NCBI: entry; OMA: entry
Species	Human	Mouse
Entrez	79047	233107
Ensembl	ENSG00000153885	ENSMUSG00000030499
UniProt	Q96SI1	Q8K0E1
RefSeq (mRNA)	NM_001129994; NM_001129995; NM_024076	NM_146188; NM_001360818; NM_001360820
RefSeq (protein)	NP_001123466; NP_001123467; NP_076981	NP_666300; NP_001347747; NP_001347749
Location (UCSC)	Chr 19: 33.8 – 33.82 Mb	Chr 7: 34.34 – 34.36 Mb
PubMed search
- Wikidata
View/Edit Human	View/Edit Mouse

Potassium channel tetramerisation domain containing 15 also known as BTB/POZ domain-containing protein KCTD15 is protein that in humans is encoded by the KCTD15 gene.

== Clinical significance ==
Variants of the KCTD15 gene may be associated with obesity.

== See also ==
- Potassium channel tetramerisation domain
