= TNFAIP1 =

Protein-coding gene in the species Homo sapiens

Identifiers
- Aliases: TNFAIP1, B12, B61, BTBD34, EDP1, hBACURD2, TNF alpha induced protein 1
- External IDs: OMIM: 191161; MGI: 104961; GeneCards: TNFAIP1

Gene location (Human)
Chr.	Chromosome 17 (human)
Band	17q11.2	Start	28,335,602 bp
Band	17q11.2	End	28,347,009 bp

Gene location (Mouse)
Chr.	Chromosome 11 (mouse)
Band	11 B5|11 46.74 cM	Start	78,413,676 bp
Band	11 B5|11 46.74 cM	End	78,427,158 bp
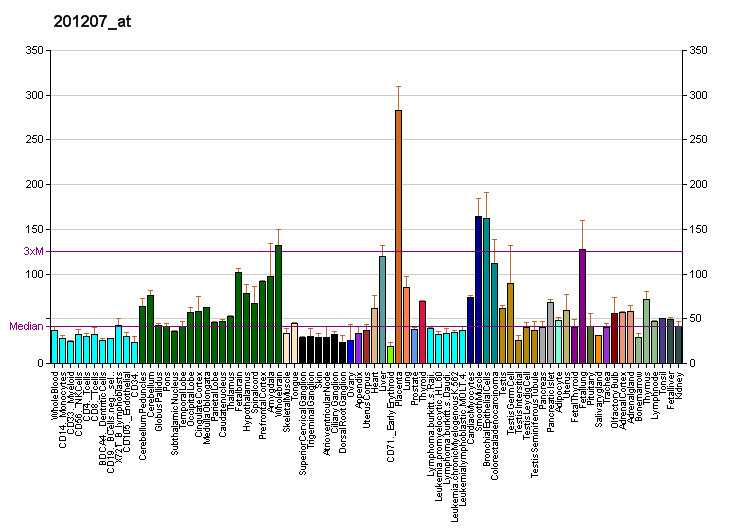

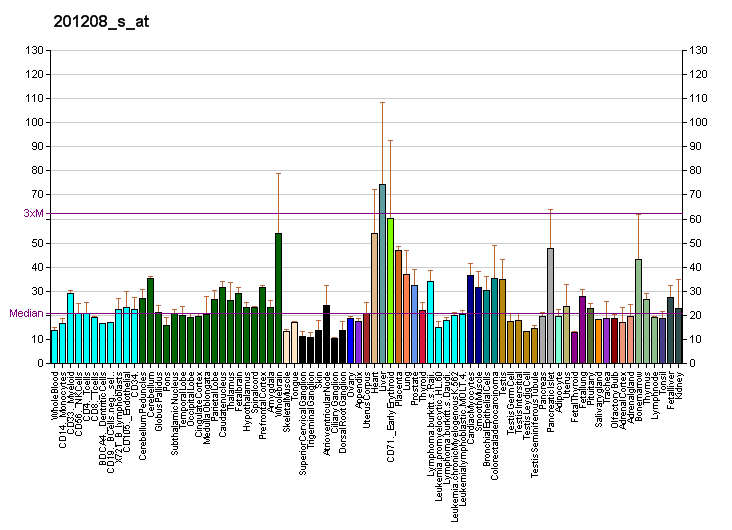
RNA expression pattern
Bgee	Human / Mouse (ortholog); Top expressed in: hair follicle; spleen; upper lobe of left lung; left ventricle; right lobe of liver; gallbladder; right lung; islet of Langerhans; body of pancreas; smooth muscle tissue / Top expressed in: Paneth cell; endocardial cushion; endothelial cell of lymphatic vessel; fossa; condyle; ciliary body; medullary collecting duct; retinal pigment epithelium; atrioventricular junction; internal carotid artery; More reference expression data
BioGPS	More reference expression data
Gene ontology
Molecular function	ubiquitin-protein transferase activity; protein binding; protein domain specific binding; identical protein binding
Cellular component	cytoplasm; endosome; Cul3-RING ubiquitin ligase complex; nucleolus; nucleus
Biological process	positive regulation of DNA replication; DNA replication; negative regulation of Rho protein signal transduction; protein homooligomerization; cell migration; protein ubiquitination; immune response; stress fiber assembly; proteasome-mediated ubiquitin-dependent protein catabolic process; apoptotic process
Sources:Amigo / QuickGO
Orthologs
Databases	NCBI: entry; OMA: entry
Species	Human	Mouse
Entrez	7126	21927
Ensembl	ENSG00000109079	ENSMUSG00000017615
UniProt	Q13829	O70479
RefSeq (mRNA)	NM_021137	NM_001159392; NM_009395
RefSeq (protein)	NP_066960	NP_001152864; NP_033421
Location (UCSC)	Chr 17: 28.34 – 28.35 Mb	Chr 11: 78.41 – 78.43 Mb
PubMed search
- Wikidata
View/Edit Human	View/Edit Mouse

BTB/POZ domain-containing protein TNFAIP1 is a protein that in humans is encoded by the TNFAIP1 gene.

This gene was identified as a gene whose expression can be induced by the tumor necrosis factor alpha (TNF) in umbilical vein endothelial cells. Studies of a similar gene in mouse suggest that the expression of this gene is developmentally regulated in a tissue-specific manner.
