= NALCN =

Protein-coding gene in humans

Identifiers
- Aliases: NALCN, CanIon, INNFD, VGCNL1, bA430M15.1, CLIFAHDD, IHPRF, IHPRF1, sodium leak channel, non-selective
- External IDs: OMIM: 611549; MGI: 2444306; GeneCards: NALCN

Gene location (Human)
Chr.	Chromosome 13 (human)
Band	13q32.3-q33.1	Start	101,053,776 bp
Band	13q32.3-q33.1	End	101,416,508 bp

Gene location (Mouse)
Chr.	Chromosome 14 (mouse)
Band	14|14 E5	Start	123,276,634 bp
Band	14|14 E5	End	123,627,144 bp
RNA expression pattern
Bgee	Human / Mouse (ortholog); Top expressed in: middle temporal gyrus; Brodmann area 23; corpus callosum; endothelial cell; Brodmann area 46; postcentral gyrus; entorhinal cortex; lateral nuclear group of thalamus; superior frontal gyrus; retinal pigment epithelium / Top expressed in: otolith organ; utricle; mammillary body; paraventricular nucleus of hypothalamus; habenula; arcuate nucleus; lateral hypothalamus; ventromedial nucleus; suprachiasmatic nucleus; medial vestibular nucleus; More reference expression data
BioGPS	n/a
Gene ontology
Molecular function	ion channel activity; sodium channel activity; protein binding; voltage-gated ion channel activity; leak channel activity; cation channel activity
Cellular component	integral component of membrane; plasma membrane; membrane
Biological process	regulation of ion transmembrane transport; membrane depolarization during action potential; ion transport; calcium ion transport; sodium ion transport; transmembrane transport; potassium ion transmembrane transport; sodium ion transmembrane transport; calcium ion transmembrane transport; regulation of resting membrane potential; ion transmembrane transport
Sources:Amigo / QuickGO
Orthologs
Databases	NCBI: entry; OMA: entry
Species	Human	Mouse
Entrez	259232	338370
Ensembl	ENSG00000102452	ENSMUSG00000000197
UniProt	Q8IZF0	Q8BXR5
RefSeq (mRNA)	NM_052867; NM_001350748; NM_001350749; NM_001350750; NM_001350751	NM_177393; NM_177754
RefSeq (protein)	NP_443099; NP_001337677; NP_001337678; NP_001337679; NP_001337680	NP_796367
Location (UCSC)	Chr 13: 101.05 – 101.42 Mb	Chr 14: 123.28 – 123.63 Mb
PubMed search
- Wikidata
View/Edit Human	View/Edit Mouse

The sodium ion channel NALCN is a protein that is encoded by the NALCN gene in humans. NALCN is a non-selective sodium leak channel that is widely expressed in the central nervous system, where it regulates resting membrane potential. NALCN was first identified in 1999, and has been shown to be involved in mediating respiratory rhythm. NALCN has been found to be expressed in nearly all neurons of the central nervous system in both mammals and invertebrates, and its expression has also been identified in oligodendrocytes.
