= KCTD9 =

Protein-coding gene in the species Homo sapiens

Identifiers
- Aliases: KCTD9, BTBD27, potassium channel tetramerization domain containing 9
- External IDs: OMIM: 617265; MGI: 2145579; GeneCards: KCTD9
Available structures
PDB	Ortholog search: PDBe RCSB
PDB	List of PDB id codes 5BXH

Gene location (Human)
Chr.	Chromosome 8 (human)
Band	8p21.2	Start	25,427,847 bp
Band	8p21.2	End	25,458,476 bp

Gene location (Mouse)
Chr.	Chromosome 14 (mouse)
Band	14|14 D1	Start	67,953,386 bp
Band	14|14 D1	End	67,979,759 bp
RNA expression pattern
Bgee	Human / Mouse (ortholog); Top expressed in: jejunal mucosa; Descending thoracic aorta; tibial nerve; Achilles tendon; sural nerve; tibial arteries; right ventricle; ascending aorta; gastric mucosa; oocyte / Top expressed in: spermatid; spermatocyte; muscle of thigh; deep cerebellar nuclei; medial vestibular nucleus; decidua; cumulus cell; myocardium of ventricle; quadriceps femoris muscle; triceps brachii muscle; More reference expression data
BioGPS	n/a
Gene ontology
Molecular function	protein binding; identical protein binding; protein self-association; cullin family protein binding
Cellular component	intracellular anatomical structure
Biological process	protein homooligomerization; intracellular signal transduction; protein ubiquitination
Sources:Amigo / QuickGO
Orthologs
Databases	NCBI: entry; OMA: entry
Species	Human	Mouse
Entrez	54793	105440
Ensembl	ENSG00000104756	ENSMUSG00000034327
UniProt	Q7L273	Q80UN1
RefSeq (mRNA)	NM_017634	NM_001111028; NM_001285933; NM_134073
RefSeq (protein)	NP_060104	NP_001104498; NP_001272862; NP_598834
Location (UCSC)	Chr 8: 25.43 – 25.46 Mb	Chr 14: 67.95 – 67.98 Mb
PubMed search
- Wikidata
View/Edit Human	View/Edit Mouse

Potassium channel tetramerization domain containing 9 is a protein that in humans is encoded by the KCTD9 gene.
