= KCTD12 =

Protein-coding gene in the species Homo sapiens

Identifiers
- Aliases: KCTD12, C13orf2, PFET1, PFETIN, potassium channel tetramerization domain containing 12
- External IDs: OMIM: 610521; MGI: 2145823; GeneCards: KCTD12

Gene location (Human)
Chr.	Chromosome 13 (human)
Band	13q22.3	Start	76,880,175 bp
Band	13q22.3	End	76,886,405 bp

Gene location (Mouse)
Chr.	Chromosome 14 (mouse)
Band	14|14 E2.3	Start	103,214,017 bp
Band	14|14 E2.3	End	103,220,073 bp
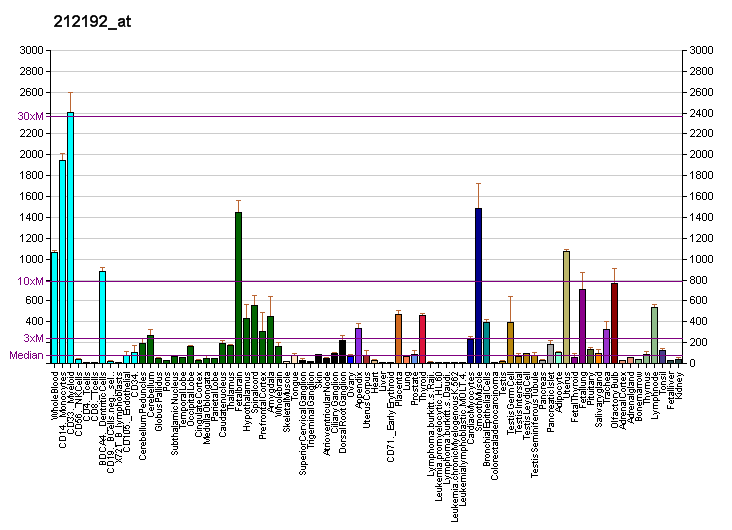

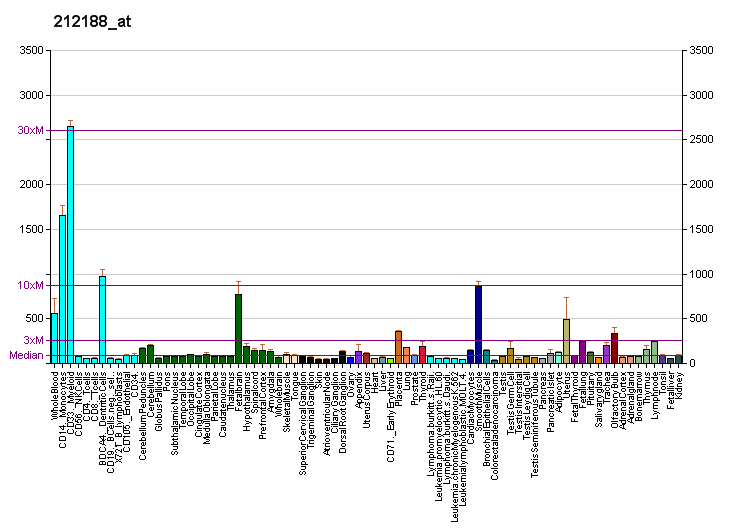
RNA expression pattern
Bgee	Human / Mouse (ortholog); Top expressed in: trigeminal ganglion; urethra; bronchial epithelial cell; lactiferous duct; synovial joint; mucosa of paranasal sinus; superficial temporal artery; lower lobe of lung; pericardium; parietal pleura / Top expressed in: molar; vestibular sensory epithelium; granulocyte; pineal gland; dermis; body of femur; human fetus; lobe of cerebellum; skin of external ear; cerebellar vermis; More reference expression data
BioGPS	More reference expression data
Gene ontology
Molecular function	RNA binding; identical protein binding
Cellular component	cell junction; postsynaptic membrane; plasma membrane; synapse; extracellular exosome; presynaptic membrane; membrane
Biological process	protein homooligomerization
Sources:Amigo / QuickGO
Orthologs
Databases	NCBI: entry; OMA: entry
Species	Human	Mouse
Entrez	115207	239217
Ensembl	ENSG00000178695	ENSMUSG00000098557
UniProt	Q96CX2	Q6WVG3
RefSeq (mRNA)	NM_138444	NM_177715
RefSeq (protein)	NP_612453	NP_808383
Location (UCSC)	Chr 13: 76.88 – 76.89 Mb	Chr 14: 103.21 – 103.22 Mb
PubMed search
- Wikidata
View/Edit Human	View/Edit Mouse

BTB/POZ domain-containing protein KCTD12 is a protein that in humans is encoded by the KCTD12 gene.

It may be associated with rumination and Bipolar Disorder.
