= KCNS3 =

Protein-coding gene in the species Homo sapiens

Identifiers
- Aliases: KCNS3, KV9.3, potassium voltage-gated channel modifier subfamily S member 3
- External IDs: OMIM: 603888; MGI: 1098804; GeneCards: KCNS3

Gene location (Human)
Chr.	Chromosome 2 (human)
Band	2p24.2	Start	17,877,847 bp
Band	2p24.2	End	18,361,616 bp

Gene location (Mouse)
Chr.	Chromosome 12 (mouse)
Band	12 A1.1|12 5.58 cM	Start	11,140,203 bp
Band	12 A1.1|12 5.58 cM	End	11,201,057 bp
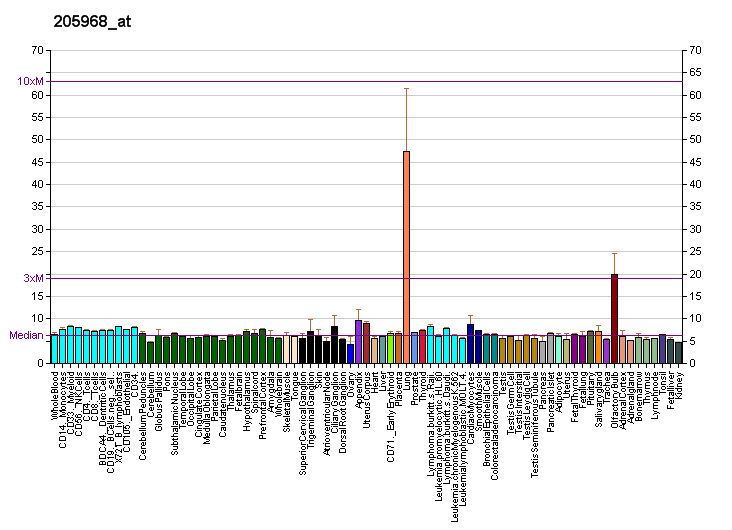
RNA expression pattern
Bgee	Human / Mouse (ortholog); Top expressed in: vastus lateralis muscle; Skeletal muscle tissue of rectus abdominis; visceral pleura; Skeletal muscle tissue of biceps brachii; retinal pigment epithelium; hair follicle; muscle of thigh; palpebral conjunctiva; gastrocnemius muscle; upper lobe of left lung / Top expressed in: lumbar spinal ganglion; morula; olfactory epithelium; embryo; embryo; blastocyst; primary visual cortex; dentate gyrus of hippocampal formation granule cell; white adipose tissue; superior frontal gyrus; More reference expression data
BioGPS	More reference expression data
Gene ontology
Molecular function	potassium channel activity; delayed rectifier potassium channel activity; voltage-gated ion channel activity; ion channel activity; potassium channel regulator activity; voltage-gated potassium channel activity
Cellular component	integral component of membrane; Golgi apparatus; membrane; voltage-gated potassium channel complex; plasma membrane; cytosol
Biological process	regulation of insulin secretion; regulation of ion transmembrane transport; ion transport; potassium ion transport; transmembrane transport; potassium ion transmembrane transport; protein homooligomerization
Sources:Amigo / QuickGO
Orthologs
Databases	NCBI: entry; OMA: entry
Species	Human	Mouse
Entrez	3790	238076
Ensembl	ENSG00000170745	ENSMUSG00000043673
UniProt	Q9BQ31	Q8BQZ8
RefSeq (mRNA)	NM_001282428; NM_002252	NM_001168564; NM_173417
RefSeq (protein)	NP_001269357; NP_002243	NP_001162036; NP_775593
Location (UCSC)	Chr 2: 17.88 – 18.36 Mb	Chr 12: 11.14 – 11.2 Mb
PubMed search
- Wikidata
View/Edit Human	View/Edit Mouse

Potassium voltage-gated channel subfamily S member 3 (Kv9.3) is a protein that in humans is encoded by the KCNS3 gene. KCNS3 gene belongs to the S subfamily of the potassium channel family. It is highly expressed in pulmonary artery myocytes, placenta, and parvalbumin-containing GABA neurons in brain cortex. In humans, single-nucleotide polymorphisms of the KCNS3 gene are associated with airway hyperresponsiveness, whereas decreased KCNS3 mRNA expression is found in the prefrontal cortex of patients with schizophrenia.

== Function ==
Voltage-gated potassium channels form the largest and most diversified class of ion channels and are present in both excitable and nonexcitable cells. Their main functions are associated with the regulation of the resting membrane potential and the control of the shape and frequency of action potentials. The alpha subunits are of 2 types: those that are functional by themselves and those that are electrically silent but capable of modulating the activity of specific functional alpha subunits. The Kv9.3 protein (encoded by KCNS3 gene) is not functional by itself but can form functional heteromultimers with Kv2.1 (encoded by KCNB1) and Kv2.2 (encoded by KCNB2) (and possibly other members) of the Shab-related subfamily of potassium voltage-gated channel proteins. Heteromeric Kv2.1/Kv9.3 channels form with fixed stoichiometry consisting of three Kv2.1 subunits and one Kv9.3 subunit.

== See also ==
- Voltage-gated potassium channel
