= Sodium/hydrogen exchanger 11 =

Protein found in humans

SLC9C2

Identifiers
- Aliases: SLC9C2, SLC9A11, solute carrier family 9 member C2 (putative)
- External IDs: GeneCards: SLC9C2

Gene location (Human)
Chr.	Chromosome 1 (human)
Band	1q25.1	Start	173,500,460 bp
Band	1q25.1	End	173,603,072 bp
RNA expression pattern
Bgee	Human / Mouse (ortholog); Top expressed in: right uterine tube; testicle; right testis; left testis; sperm; bronchial epithelial cell; olfactory zone of nasal mucosa; caudate nucleus; mucosa of paranasal sinus; nucleus accumbens / n/a; More reference expression data
BioGPS	n/a
Gene ontology
Molecular function	solute:proton antiporter activity; antiporter activity; sodium:proton antiporter activity; potassium:proton antiporter activity
Cellular component	membrane; integral component of membrane; plasma membrane
Biological process	ion transport; transmembrane transport; proton transmembrane transport; sodium ion transport; cation transport; potassium ion transmembrane transport; regulation of intracellular pH; sodium ion import across plasma membrane; anion transmembrane transport
Sources:Amigo / QuickGO
Orthologs
Databases	NCBI: entry; OMA: entry
Species	Human	Mouse
Entrez	284525	n/a
Ensembl	ENSG00000162753	n/a
UniProt	Q5TAH2	n/a
RefSeq (mRNA)	NM_178527	n/a
RefSeq (protein)	NP_848622	n/a
Location (UCSC)	Chr 1: 173.5 – 173.6 Mb	n/a
PubMed search		n/a
- Wikidata
View/Edit Human

Sodium/hydrogen exchanger 11, also known as solute carrier family 9, member 11, is a protein that in humans is encoded by the gene SLC9C2 (formerly SLC9A11). SLC9C2 is a member of the sodium–hydrogen exchanger (NHE) family.
