= Sodium/hydrogen exchanger 10 =

Protein-coding gene in the species Homo sapiens

SLC9C1

Identifiers
- Aliases: SLC9C1, NHE, SLC9A10, sperm-NHE, NHE-10, solute carrier family 9 member C1
- External IDs: OMIM: 612738; MGI: 2685456; GeneCards: SLC9C1

Gene location (Human)
Chr.	Chromosome 3 (human)
Band	3q13.2	Start	112,140,898 bp
Band	3q13.2	End	112,294,227 bp

Gene location (Mouse)
Chr.	Chromosome 16 (mouse)
Band	16|16 B5	Start	45,355,672 bp
Band	16|16 B5	End	45,427,364 bp
RNA expression pattern
Bgee	Human / Mouse (ortholog); Top expressed in: testicle; body of pancreas; left testis; right testis; gonad; skin of abdomen; skin of leg; left ventricle; apex of heart; left lobe of thyroid gland / Top expressed in: spermatocyte; spermatid; testicle; islet of Langerhans; More reference expression data
BioGPS	n/a
Gene ontology
Molecular function	solute:proton antiporter activity; antiporter activity; potassium:proton antiporter activity; sodium:proton antiporter activity; ion channel activity
Cellular component	integral component of membrane; cell projection; motile cilium; cilium; membrane; plasma membrane
Biological process	multicellular organism development; proton transmembrane transport; flagellated sperm motility; cell differentiation; cation transport; ion transport; spermatogenesis; sodium ion transport; regulation of intracellular pH; sodium ion import across plasma membrane; potassium ion transmembrane transport; transmembrane transport; anion transmembrane transport
Sources:Amigo / QuickGO
Orthologs
Databases	NCBI: entry; OMA: entry
Species	Human	Mouse
Entrez	285335	208169
Ensembl	ENSG00000172139; ENSG00000285044	ENSMUSG00000033210
UniProt	Q4G0N8	Q6UJY2
RefSeq (mRNA)	NM_183061; NM_001320531	NM_198106
RefSeq (protein)	NP_001307460; NP_898884	NP_932774
Location (UCSC)	Chr 3: 112.14 – 112.29 Mb	Chr 16: 45.36 – 45.43 Mb
PubMed search
- Wikidata
View/Edit Human	View/Edit Mouse

Sodium/hydrogen exchanger 10, also known as Solute carrier family 9 member C1, is a protein that in humans is encoded by the gene SLC9C1 (previously SLC9A10).

== Function ==
SLC9C1 is a member of the sodium-hydrogen exchanger (NHE) family and is required for male fertility and sperm motility.
