= KCNH3 =

Protein-coding gene in humans

Identifiers
- Aliases: KCNH3, BEC1, ELK2, Kv12.2, potassium voltage-gated channel subfamily H member 3
- External IDs: OMIM: 604527; MGI: 1341723; GeneCards: KCNH3

Gene location (Human)
Chr.	Chromosome 12 (human)
Band	12q13.12	Start	49,539,030 bp
Band	12q13.12	End	49,558,337 bp

Gene location (Mouse)
Chr.	Chromosome 15 (mouse)
Band	15|15 F1	Start	99,122,742 bp
Band	15|15 F1	End	99,140,698 bp
RNA expression pattern
Bgee	Human / Mouse (ortholog); Top expressed in: right frontal lobe; Brodmann area 9; cingulate gyrus; anterior cingulate cortex; prefrontal cortex; amygdala; caudate nucleus; putamen; right uterine tube; nucleus accumbens / Top expressed in: superior frontal gyrus; primary visual cortex; dentate gyrus of hippocampal formation granule cell; prefrontal cortex; Region I of hippocampus proper; olfactory tubercle; subiculum; piriform cortex; gastrula; ciliary body; More reference expression data
BioGPS	n/a
Gene ontology
Molecular function	phosphorelay sensor kinase activity; protein binding; voltage-gated potassium channel activity; ion channel activity; potassium channel activity; voltage-gated ion channel activity
Cellular component	intracellular anatomical structure; plasma membrane; integral component of membrane; membrane; integral component of plasma membrane
Biological process	phosphorelay signal transduction system; signal transduction; regulation of ion transmembrane transport; regulation of membrane potential; potassium ion transmembrane transport; potassium ion transport; ion transport; transmembrane transport
Sources:Amigo / QuickGO
Orthologs
Databases	NCBI: entry; OMA: entry
Species	Human	Mouse
Entrez	23416	16512
Ensembl	ENSG00000135519	ENSMUSG00000037579
UniProt	Q9ULD8	Q9WVJ0
RefSeq (mRNA)	NM_001314030; NM_012284	NM_010601
RefSeq (protein)	NP_001300959; NP_036416	NP_034731
Location (UCSC)	Chr 12: 49.54 – 49.56 Mb	Chr 15: 99.12 – 99.14 Mb
PubMed search
- Wikidata
View/Edit Human	View/Edit Mouse

Potassium voltage-gated channel subfamily H member 3 is a protein that in humans is encoded by the KCNH3 gene. The protein encoded by this gene is a voltage-gated potassium channel subunit.
