= KCNH4 =

Protein-coding gene in the species Homo sapiens

Identifiers
- Aliases: KCNH4, BEC2, ELK1, Kv12.3, potassium voltage-gated channel subfamily H member 4
- External IDs: OMIM: 604528; MGI: 2156184; GeneCards: KCNH4

Gene location (Human)
Chr.	Chromosome 17 (human)
Band	17q21.2	Start	42,156,891 bp
Band	17q21.2	End	42,181,142 bp

Gene location (Mouse)
Chr.	Chromosome 11 (mouse)
Band	11 D|11 63.57 cM	Start	100,631,202 bp
Band	11 D|11 63.57 cM	End	100,650,768 bp
RNA expression pattern
Bgee	Human / Mouse (ortholog); Top expressed in: putamen; testicle; caudate nucleus; nucleus accumbens; prefrontal cortex; right frontal lobe; Brodmann area 9; primary visual cortex; anterior cingulate cortex; appendix / Top expressed in: striatum of neuraxis; superior frontal gyrus; primary visual cortex; mesencephalon; olfactory bulb; neural tube; epiblast; ganglionic eminence; hypothalamus; rhombencephalon; More reference expression data
BioGPS	n/a
Gene ontology
Molecular function	voltage-gated ion channel activity; ion channel activity; phosphorelay sensor kinase activity; potassium channel activity; voltage-gated potassium channel activity
Cellular component	integral component of membrane; intracellular anatomical structure; plasma membrane; voltage-gated potassium channel complex; membrane; integral component of plasma membrane
Biological process	ion transport; phosphorelay signal transduction system; signal transduction; potassium ion transmembrane transport; potassium ion transport; regulation of ion transmembrane transport; transmembrane transport; regulation of membrane potential
Sources:Amigo / QuickGO
Orthologs
Databases	NCBI: entry; OMA: entry
Species	Human	Mouse
Entrez	23415	380728
Ensembl	ENSG00000089558	ENSMUSG00000035355
UniProt	Q9UQ05	A2A5F7
RefSeq (mRNA)	NM_012285	NM_001081194
RefSeq (protein)	NP_036417	NP_001074663
Location (UCSC)	Chr 17: 42.16 – 42.18 Mb	Chr 11: 100.63 – 100.65 Mb
PubMed search
- Wikidata
View/Edit Human	View/Edit Mouse

Potassium voltage-gated channel subfamily H member 4 is a protein, that in humans, is encoded by the KCNH4 gene. The protein encoded by this gene is a voltage-gated potassium channel subunit.
