= KCNH8 =

Protein-coding gene in the species Homo sapiens

Identifiers
- Aliases: KCNH8, ELK, ELK1, Kv12.1, elk3, potassium voltage-gated channel subfamily H member 8
- External IDs: OMIM: 608260; MGI: 2445160; GeneCards: KCNH8

Gene location (Human)
Chr.	Chromosome 3 (human)
Band	3p24.3	Start	19,148,510 bp
Band	3p24.3	End	19,535,642 bp

Gene location (Mouse)
Chr.	Chromosome 17 (mouse)
Band	17|17 C	Start	52,909,737 bp
Band	17|17 C	End	53,286,222 bp
RNA expression pattern
Bgee	Human / Mouse (ortholog); Top expressed in: corpus callosum; endothelial cell; C1 segment; substantia nigra; pituitary gland; anterior pituitary; putamen; hippocampus proper; testicle; amygdala / Top expressed in: otolith organ; utricle; pituitary gland; habenula; lumbar spinal ganglion; vestibular sensory epithelium; Rostral migratory stream; ganglionic eminence; suprachiasmatic nucleus; trigeminal ganglion; More reference expression data
BioGPS	n/a
Gene ontology
Molecular function	voltage-gated potassium channel activity; ion channel activity; phosphorelay sensor kinase activity; potassium channel activity; voltage-gated ion channel activity
Cellular component	integral component of membrane; intracellular anatomical structure; membrane; integral component of plasma membrane; plasma membrane
Biological process	phosphorelay signal transduction system; regulation of membrane potential; potassium ion transport; regulation of ion transmembrane transport; ion transport; transmembrane transport; signal transduction; potassium ion transmembrane transport
Sources:Amigo / QuickGO
Orthologs
Databases	NCBI: entry; OMA: entry
Species	Human	Mouse
Entrez	131096	211468
Ensembl	ENSG00000183960	ENSMUSG00000035580
UniProt	Q96L42	P59111
RefSeq (mRNA)	NM_144633	NM_001031811
RefSeq (protein)	NP_653234	NP_001026981
Location (UCSC)	Chr 3: 19.15 – 19.54 Mb	Chr 17: 52.91 – 53.29 Mb
PubMed search
- Wikidata
View/Edit Human	View/Edit Mouse

Potassium voltage-gated channel subfamily H member 8 is a protein that in humans is encoded by the KCNH8 gene. The protein encoded by this gene is a voltage-gated potassium channel subunit.
