= KCNC2 =

Protein-coding gene in humans

Identifiers
- Aliases: KCNC2, KV3.2, potassium voltage-gated channel subfamily C member 2
- External IDs: OMIM: 176256; MGI: 96668; GeneCards: KCNC2

Gene location (Human)
Chr.	Chromosome 12 (human)
Band	12q21.1	Start	75,040,077 bp
Band	12q21.1	End	75,209,839 bp

Gene location (Mouse)
Chr.	Chromosome 10 (mouse)
Band	10 D2|10 60.3 cM	Start	112,107,026 bp
Band	10 D2|10 60.3 cM	End	112,302,929 bp
RNA expression pattern
Bgee	Human / Mouse (ortholog); Top expressed in: prefrontal cortex; Brodmann area 9; cingulate gyrus; anterior cingulate cortex; right frontal lobe; testicle; hypothalamus; amygdala; pituitary gland; hippocampus proper / Top expressed in: lateral geniculate nucleus; medial geniculate nucleus; medial dorsal nucleus; inferior colliculi; globus pallidus; superior colliculus; subiculum; primary motor cortex; piriform cortex; medial vestibular nucleus; More reference expression data
BioGPS	n/a
Gene ontology
Molecular function	potassium channel activity; transmembrane transporter binding; voltage-gated ion channel activity; ion channel activity; voltage-gated potassium channel activity; delayed rectifier potassium channel activity; voltage-gated ion channel activity involved in regulation of presynaptic membrane potential
Cellular component	integral component of membrane; vesicle; perikaryon; postsynaptic membrane; cell projection; membrane; voltage-gated potassium channel complex; plasma membrane; synapse; integral component of plasma membrane; intracellular anatomical structure; neuronal cell body membrane; axon; cell junction; terminal bouton; soma; dendrite; basolateral plasma membrane; apical plasma membrane; axolemma; neuron projection; presynaptic membrane; dendrite membrane
Biological process	response to organic cyclic compound; protein heterooligomerization; regulation of insulin secretion; response to nerve growth factor; regulation of ion transmembrane transport; cellular response to toxic substance; response to magnesium ion; ion transport; globus pallidus development; nitric oxide-cGMP-mediated signaling pathway; potassium ion transport; ion transmembrane transport; transmembrane transport; response to amine; positive regulation of potassium ion transmembrane transport; cellular response to nitric oxide; response to light intensity; response to ethanol; protein homooligomerization; response to toxic substance; cellular response to ammonium ion; potassium ion transmembrane transport; positive regulation of voltage-gated potassium channel activity; regulation of presynaptic membrane potential
Sources:Amigo / QuickGO
Orthologs
Databases	NCBI: entry; OMA: entry
Species	Human	Mouse
Entrez	3747	268345
Ensembl	ENSG00000166006	ENSMUSG00000035681
UniProt	Q96PR1	Q14B80
RefSeq (mRNA)	NM_001260497; NM_001260498; NM_001260499; NM_139136; NM_139137 NM_153748	NM_001025581; NM_001359752; NM_001359753; NM_001379643; NM_001379644
RefSeq (protein)	NP_001247426; NP_001247427; NP_001247428; NP_631874; NP_631875 NP_715624	NP_001020752; NP_001346681; NP_001346682; NP_001366572; NP_001366573
Location (UCSC)	Chr 12: 75.04 – 75.21 Mb	Chr 10: 112.11 – 112.3 Mb
PubMed search
- Wikidata
View/Edit Human	View/Edit Mouse

Potassium voltage-gated channel subfamily C member 2 is a protein that in humans is encoded by the KCNC2 gene. The protein encoded by this gene is a voltage-gated potassium channel subunit (Kv3.2).

== Expression pattern ==
K_{v}3.1 and K_{v}3.2 channels are prominently expressed in neurons that fire at high frequency. K_{v}3.2 channels are prominently expressed in brain (fast-spiking GABAergic interneurons of the neocortex, hippocampus, and caudate nucleus; terminal fields of thalamocortical projections), and in retinal ganglion cells.

== Physiological role ==
K_{v}3.1/K_{v}3.2 conductance is necessary and kinetically optimized for high-frequency action potential generation. Sometimes in heteromeric complexes with K_{v}3.1; important for the high-frequency firing of fast spiking GABAergic interneurons and retinal ganglion cells; and GABA release via regulation of action potential duration in presynaptic terminals.

== Pharmacological properties ==
K_{v}3.2 currents in heterologous systems are highly sensitive to external tetraethylammonium (TEA) or 4-aminopyridine (4-AP) (IC_{50} values are 0.1 mM for both of the drugs). This can be useful in identifying native channels.

== Transcript variants ==
There are four transcript variants of K_{v}3.2 gene: K_{v}3.2a, K_{v}3.2b, K_{v}3.2c, K_{v}3.2d. K_{v}3.2 isoforms differ only in their C-terminal sequence.
