= KCNG3 =

Protein-coding gene in the species Homo sapiens

Identifiers
- Aliases: KCNG3, KV10.1, KV6.3, potassium voltage-gated channel modifier subfamily G member 3
- External IDs: OMIM: 606767; MGI: 2663923; GeneCards: KCNG3

Gene location (Human)
Chr.	Chromosome 2 (human)
Band	2p21	Start	42,442,017 bp
Band	2p21	End	42,493,982 bp

Gene location (Mouse)
Chr.	Chromosome 17 (mouse)
Band	17|17 E4	Start	83,893,386 bp
Band	17|17 E4	End	83,939,324 bp
RNA expression pattern
Bgee	Human / Mouse (ortholog); Top expressed in: islet of Langerhans; prefrontal cortex; right adrenal gland; left adrenal gland; right adrenal cortex; middle temporal gyrus; endometrium; left adrenal cortex; Brodmann area 23; entorhinal cortex / Top expressed in: secondary oocyte; zygote; primary oocyte; epiblast; dentate gyrus of hippocampal formation granule cell; embryo; adrenal gland; hippocampus proper; ovary; Cortex of frontal lobe; More reference expression data
BioGPS	n/a
Gene ontology
Molecular function	voltage-gated potassium channel activity; ion channel activity; potassium channel activity; protein binding; delayed rectifier potassium channel activity; voltage-gated ion channel activity
Cellular component	cytoplasm; integral component of membrane; voltage-gated potassium channel complex; plasma membrane; endoplasmic reticulum; membrane
Biological process	potassium ion transport; regulation of ion transmembrane transport; protein homooligomerization; ion transport; transmembrane transport; potassium ion transmembrane transport
Sources:Amigo / QuickGO
Orthologs
Databases	NCBI: entry; OMA: entry
Species	Human	Mouse
Entrez	170850	225030
Ensembl	ENSG00000171126	ENSMUSG00000045053
UniProt	Q8TAE7	P59053
RefSeq (mRNA)	NM_172344; NM_133329	NM_153512
RefSeq (protein)	NP_579875; NP_758847	NP_705732
Location (UCSC)	Chr 2: 42.44 – 42.49 Mb	Chr 17: 83.89 – 83.94 Mb
PubMed search
- Wikidata
View/Edit Human	View/Edit Mouse

Potassium voltage-gated channel subfamily G member 3 is a protein that in humans is encoded by the KCNG3 gene. The protein encoded by this gene is a voltage-gated potassium channel subunit.
