= KCNH7 =

Protein-coding gene in the species Homo sapiens

Identifiers
- Aliases: KCNH7, ERG3, HERG3, Kv11.3, potassium voltage-gated channel subfamily H member 7
- External IDs: OMIM: 608169; MGI: 2159566; GeneCards: KCNH7

Gene location (Human)
Chr.	Chromosome 2 (human)
Band	2q24.2	Start	162,371,407 bp
Band	2q24.2	End	162,838,767 bp

Gene location (Mouse)
Chr.	Chromosome 2 (mouse)
Band	2|2 C1.3	Start	62,523,758 bp
Band	2|2 C1.3	End	63,014,631 bp
RNA expression pattern
Bgee	Human / Mouse (ortholog); Top expressed in: testicle; pancreatic ductal cell; ventricular zone; ganglionic eminence; tibialis anterior muscle; islet of Langerhans; prefrontal cortex; mucosa of ileum; blood; corpus callosum / Top expressed in: primary visual cortex; superior frontal gyrus; ventricular zone; molecular layer of cerebellar cortex; granulocyte; embryo; dentate gyrus of hippocampal formation granule cell; granular layer; primary motor cortex; Purkinje cell; More reference expression data
BioGPS	n/a
Gene ontology
Molecular function	voltage-gated ion channel activity; ion channel activity; voltage-gated potassium channel activity; potassium channel activity
Cellular component	plasma membrane; membrane; integral component of membrane; integral component of plasma membrane
Biological process	ion transport; transmembrane transport; potassium ion transmembrane transport; potassium ion transport; regulation of membrane potential; regulation of ion transmembrane transport
Sources:Amigo / QuickGO
Orthologs
Databases	NCBI: entry; OMA: entry
Species	Human	Mouse
Entrez	90134	170738
Ensembl	ENSG00000184611	ENSMUSG00000059742
UniProt	Q9NS40	Q9ER47
RefSeq (mRNA)	NM_033272; NM_173162	NM_133207
RefSeq (protein)	NP_150375; NP_775185	NP_573470
Location (UCSC)	Chr 2: 162.37 – 162.84 Mb	Chr 2: 62.52 – 63.01 Mb
PubMed search
- Wikidata
View/Edit Human	View/Edit Mouse

Potassium voltage-gated channel subfamily H member 7 is a protein that in humans is encoded by the KCNH7 gene. The protein encoded by this gene is a voltage-gated potassium channel subunit.
