= KCNS1 =

Protein-coding gene in the species Homo sapiens

Identifiers
- Aliases: KCNS1, KV9.1, potassium voltage-gated channel modifier subfamily S member 1
- External IDs: OMIM: 602905; MGI: 1197019; GeneCards: KCNS1

Gene location (Human)
Chr.	Chromosome 20 (human)
Band	20q13.12	Start	45,091,214 bp
Band	20q13.12	End	45,101,127 bp

Gene location (Mouse)
Chr.	Chromosome 2 (mouse)
Band	2|2 H3	Start	164,005,539 bp
Band	2|2 H3	End	164,013,033 bp
RNA expression pattern
Bgee	Human / Mouse (ortholog); Top expressed in: middle temporal gyrus; Brodmann area 23; primary visual cortex; cardia; Brodmann area 46; superior frontal gyrus; postcentral gyrus; orbitofrontal cortex; spinal ganglia; ventral tegmental area / Top expressed in: lumbar spinal ganglion; parotid gland; superior frontal gyrus; primary visual cortex; calvaria; embryo; embryo; dentate gyrus of hippocampal formation granule cell; entorhinal cortex; primary motor cortex; More reference expression data
BioGPS	n/a
Gene ontology
Molecular function	voltage-gated potassium channel activity; ion channel activity; potassium channel regulator activity; potassium channel activity; protein binding; delayed rectifier potassium channel activity; voltage-gated ion channel activity
Cellular component	integral component of membrane; membrane; voltage-gated potassium channel complex; plasma membrane; perinuclear region of cytoplasm
Biological process	regulation of ion transmembrane transport; protein homooligomerization; ion transport; transmembrane transport; potassium ion transmembrane transport; regulation of delayed rectifier potassium channel activity; potassium ion transport
Sources:Amigo / QuickGO
Orthologs
Databases	NCBI: entry; OMA: entry
Species	Human	Mouse
Entrez	3787	16538
Ensembl	ENSG00000124134	ENSMUSG00000040164
UniProt	Q96KK3	O35173
RefSeq (mRNA)	NM_002251; NM_001322799	NM_008435
RefSeq (protein)	NP_001309728; NP_002242	NP_032461
Location (UCSC)	Chr 20: 45.09 – 45.1 Mb	Chr 2: 164.01 – 164.01 Mb
PubMed search
- Wikidata
View/Edit Human	View/Edit Mouse

Potassium voltage-gated channel subfamily S member 1 is a protein that in humans is encoded by the KCNS1 gene. The protein encoded by this gene is a voltage-gated potassium channel subunit.
