= KCNV1 =

Protein-coding gene in the species Homo sapiens

Identifiers
- Aliases: KCNV1, HNKA, KCNB3, KV2.3, KV8.1, potassium voltage-gated channel modifier subfamily V member 1
- External IDs: OMIM: 608164; MGI: 1914748; GeneCards: KCNV1

Gene location (Human)
Chr.	Chromosome 8 (human)
Band	8q23.2	Start	109,963,636 bp
Band	8q23.2	End	109,975,771 bp

Gene location (Mouse)
Chr.	Chromosome 15 (mouse)
Band	15|15 B3.3	Start	44,969,680 bp
Band	15|15 B3.3	End	44,978,316 bp
RNA expression pattern
Bgee	Human / Mouse (ortholog); Top expressed in: buccal mucosa cell; prefrontal cortex; endothelial cell; dorsolateral prefrontal cortex; Brodmann area 9; superior frontal gyrus; right frontal lobe; Brodmann area 23; Brodmann area 46; cingulate gyrus / Top expressed in: lumbar spinal ganglion; prefrontal cortex; primary motor cortex; superior frontal gyrus; primary visual cortex; piriform cortex; dentate gyrus of hippocampal formation granule cell; temporal lobe; hippocampus proper; cingulate gyrus; More reference expression data
BioGPS	n/a
Gene ontology
Molecular function	ion channel inhibitor activity; potassium channel regulator activity; ion channel activity; voltage-gated ion channel activity; potassium channel activity; voltage-gated potassium channel activity
Cellular component	plasma membrane; membrane; voltage-gated potassium channel complex; integral component of membrane; integral component of plasma membrane
Biological process	ion transport; transmembrane transport; potassium ion transport; protein homooligomerization; regulation of ion transmembrane transport; potassium ion transmembrane transport
Sources:Amigo / QuickGO
Orthologs
Databases	NCBI: entry; OMA: entry
Species	Human	Mouse
Entrez	27012	67498
Ensembl	ENSG00000164794	ENSMUSG00000022342
UniProt	Q6PIU1	Q8BZN2
RefSeq (mRNA)	NM_014379	NM_026200
RefSeq (protein)	NP_055194	NP_080476
Location (UCSC)	Chr 8: 109.96 – 109.98 Mb	Chr 15: 44.97 – 44.98 Mb
PubMed search
- Wikidata
View/Edit Human	View/Edit Mouse

Potassium voltage-gated channel subfamily V member 1 is a protein that in humans is encoded by the KCNV1 gene. The protein encoded by this gene is a voltage-gated potassium channel subunit.

Common variations in the KCNV1 gene have been associated with schizophrenia.
