= KCNS2 =

Protein-coding gene in the species Homo sapiens

Identifiers
- Aliases: KCNS2, KV9.2, potassium voltage-gated channel modifier subfamily S member 2
- External IDs: OMIM: 602906; MGI: 1197011; GeneCards: KCNS2

Gene location (Human)
Chr.	Chromosome 8 (human)
Band	8q22.2	Start	98,426,958 bp
Band	8q22.2	End	98,432,853 bp

Gene location (Mouse)
Chr.	Chromosome 15 (mouse)
Band	15|15 B3.1	Start	34,837,501 bp
Band	15|15 B3.1	End	34,843,553 bp
RNA expression pattern
Bgee	Human / Mouse (ortholog); Top expressed in: endothelial cell; middle temporal gyrus; Brodmann area 23; primary visual cortex; prefrontal cortex; buccal mucosa cell; Brodmann area 9; superior frontal gyrus; right frontal lobe; parietal lobe / Top expressed in: medial dorsal nucleus; habenula; dorsal striatum; olfactory tubercle; substantia nigra; nucleus accumbens; anterior amygdaloid area; lumbar subsegment of spinal cord; lateral geniculate nucleus; piriform cortex; More reference expression data
BioGPS	n/a
Gene ontology
Molecular function	ion channel activity; potassium channel activity; protein binding; voltage-gated ion channel activity; voltage-gated potassium channel activity
Cellular component	perinuclear region of cytoplasm; integral component of membrane; voltage-gated potassium channel complex; plasma membrane; membrane
Biological process	potassium ion transport; regulation of ion transmembrane transport; regulation of delayed rectifier potassium channel activity; protein homooligomerization; ion transport; transmembrane transport; potassium ion transmembrane transport
Sources:Amigo / QuickGO
Orthologs
Databases	NCBI: entry; OMA: entry
Species	Human	Mouse
Entrez	3788	16539
Ensembl	ENSG00000156486	ENSMUSG00000050963
UniProt	Q9ULS6	O35174
RefSeq (mRNA)	NM_020697	NM_001271704; NM_181317; NM_008436
RefSeq (protein)	NP_065748	NP_001258633; NP_851834
Location (UCSC)	Chr 8: 98.43 – 98.43 Mb	Chr 15: 34.84 – 34.84 Mb
PubMed search
- Wikidata
View/Edit Human	View/Edit Mouse

Potassium voltage-gated channel subfamily S member 2 is a protein that in humans is encoded by the KCNS2 gene. The protein encoded by this gene is a voltage-gated potassium channel subunit.
