= KCND1 =

Protein-coding gene in the species Homo sapiens

Identifiers
- Aliases: KCND1, KV4.1, potassium voltage-gated channel subfamily D member 1
- External IDs: OMIM: 300281; MGI: 96671; GeneCards: KCND1

Gene location (Human)
| Chr. | X chromosome (human) |
| Band | Xp11.23 | Start | 48,961,378 bp |
| Band | Xp11.23 | End | 48,971,844 bp |

Gene location (Mouse)
| Chr. | X chromosome (mouse) |
| Band | X A1.1|X 3.53 cM | Start | 7,688,528 bp |
| Band | X A1.1|X 3.53 cM | End | 7,704,519 bp |
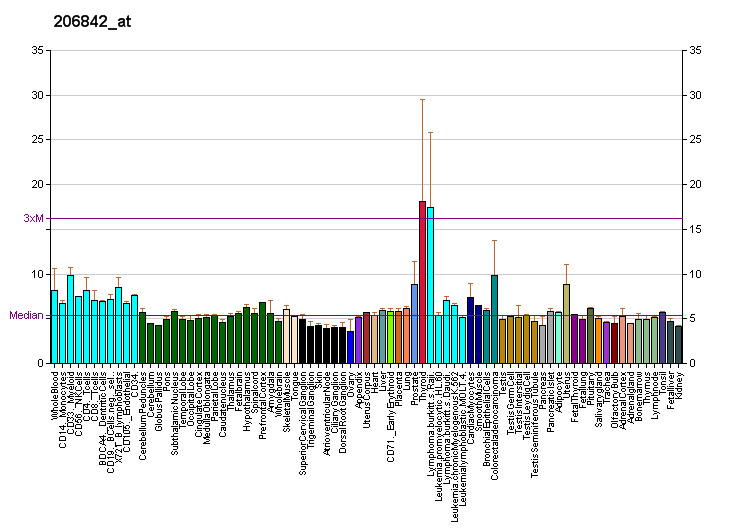
RNA expression pattern
| Bgee | Human / Mouse (ortholog); Top expressed in: gonad; right hemisphere of cerebellum; left uterine tube; stromal cell of endometrium; Descending thoracic aorta; paraflocculus of cerebellum; ascending aorta; left coronary artery; granulocyte; gallbladder / Top expressed in: lumbar spinal ganglion; facial motor nucleus; granulocyte; gastrula; tail of embryo; anterior horn of spinal cord; genital tubercle; superior frontal gyrus; dentate gyrus of hippocampal formation granule cell; primary visual cortex; More reference expression data |
| BioGPS | More reference expression data |
Gene ontology
| Molecular function | potassium channel activity; metal ion binding; voltage-gated ion channel activity; ion channel activity; A-type (transient outward) potassium channel activity; voltage-gated potassium channel activity |
| Cellular component | integral component of membrane; cell projection; membrane; voltage-gated potassium channel complex; plasma membrane; soma; dendrite; cellular component |
| Biological process | regulation of ion transmembrane transport; ion transport; potassium ion transport; transmembrane transport; potassium ion transmembrane transport; protein homooligomerization; cardiac conduction |
Sources:Amigo / QuickGO
Orthologs
| Databases | NCBI: entry; OMA: entry |
| Species | Human | Mouse |
| Entrez | 3750 | 16506 |
| Ensembl | ENSG00000102057 | ENSMUSG00000009731 |
| UniProt | Q9NSA2 | Q03719 |
| RefSeq (mRNA) | NM_004979 | NM_008423 |
| RefSeq (protein) | NP_004970 | NP_032449 |
| Location (UCSC) | Chr X: 48.96 – 48.97 Mb | Chr X: 7.69 – 7.7 Mb |
| PubMed search |
- Wikidata
| View/Edit Human | View/Edit Mouse |

Potassium voltage-gated channel, Shal-related subfamily, member 1 (KCND1), also known as K_{v}4.1, is a human gene.

Voltage-gated potassium (Kv) channels represent the most complex class of voltage-gated ion channels from both functional and structural standpoints. Their diverse functions include regulating neurotransmitter release, heart rate, insulin secretion, neuronal excitability, epithelial electrolyte transport, smooth muscle contraction, and cell volume. Four sequence-related potassium channel genes - shaker, shaw, shab, and shal - have been identified in Drosophila, and each has been shown to have human homolog(s). This gene encodes a member of the potassium channel, voltage-gated, shal-related subfamily, members of which form voltage-activated A-type potassium ion channels and are prominent in the repolarization phase of the action potential. This gene is expressed at moderate levels in all tissues analyzed, with lower levels in skeletal muscle.

== See also ==
- Voltage-gated potassium channel
