= KCNH5 =

Protein-coding gene in the species Homo sapiens

Identifiers
- Aliases: KCNH5, EAG2, H-EAG2, Kv10.2, hEAG2, potassium voltage-gated channel subfamily H member 5
- External IDs: OMIM: 605716; MGI: 3584508; GeneCards: KCNH5

Gene location (Mouse)
Chr.	Chromosome 12 (mouse)
Band	12|12 C3	Start	74,943,994 bp
Band	12|12 C3	End	75,224,106 bp
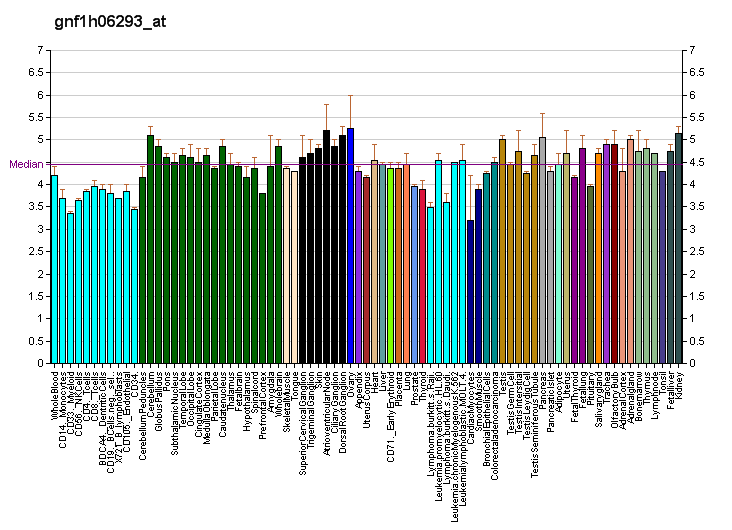

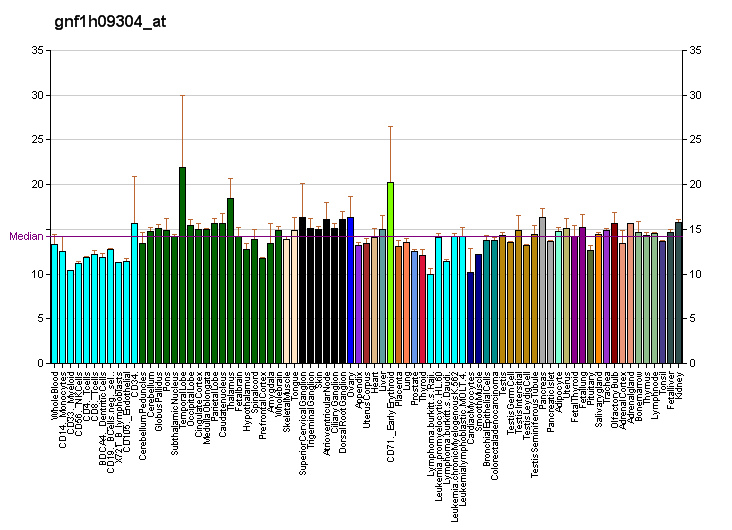

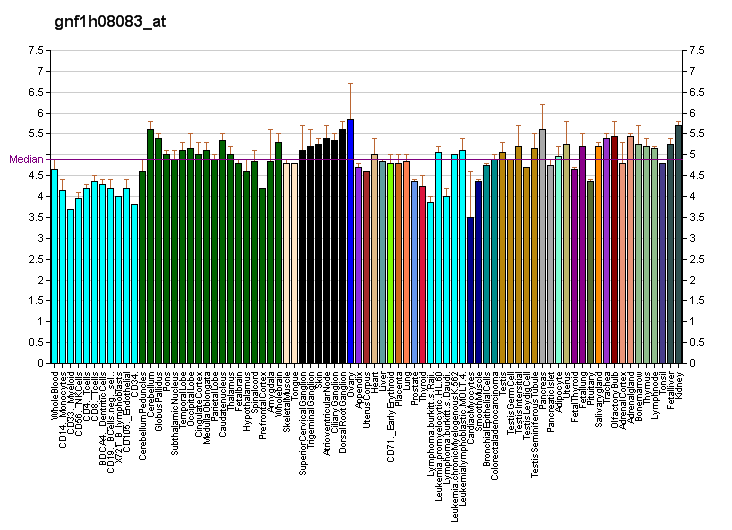
RNA expression pattern
Bgee	Human / Mouse (ortholog); Top expressed in: secondary oocyte; retinal pigment epithelium; prefrontal cortex; Brodmann area 9; superior frontal gyrus; Brodmann area 46; Brodmann area 23; postcentral gyrus; hypothalamus; corpus callosum / Top expressed in: superior frontal gyrus; visual cortex; primary visual cortex; neural layer of retina; zygote; dentate gyrus of hippocampal formation granule cell; inferior colliculi; piriform cortex; lumbar subsegment of spinal cord; embryo; More reference expression data
BioGPS	More reference expression data
Gene ontology
Molecular function	potassium channel activity; voltage-gated ion channel activity; calmodulin binding; ion channel activity; voltage-gated potassium channel activity; phosphorelay sensor kinase activity; transmembrane transporter binding; protein heterodimerization activity
Cellular component	integral component of membrane; membrane; plasma membrane; intracellular anatomical structure; cell surface; integral component of plasma membrane
Biological process	regulation of G2/M transition of mitotic cell cycle; signal transduction; regulation of membrane potential; regulation of ion transmembrane transport; ion transport; potassium ion transport; transmembrane transport; potassium ion transmembrane transport; phosphorelay signal transduction system
Sources:Amigo / QuickGO
Orthologs
Databases	NCBI: entry
Species	Human	Mouse
Entrez	27133	238271
Ensembl	n/a	ENSMUSG00000034402
UniProt	Q8NCM2	Q920E3
RefSeq (mRNA)	NM_139318; NM_172375; NM_172376	NM_172805
RefSeq (protein)	NP_647479; NP_758963	NP_766393
Location (UCSC)	n/a	Chr 12: 74.94 – 75.22 Mb
PubMed search
- Wikidata
View/Edit Human	View/Edit Mouse

Potassium voltage-gated channel, subfamily H (eag-related), member 5, also known as KCNH5, is a human gene encoding the K_{v}10.2 protein.

Voltage-gated potassium (Kv) channels represent the most complex class of voltage-gated ion channels from both functional and structural standpoints. Their diverse functions include regulating neurotransmitter release, heart rate, insulin secretion, neuronal excitability, epithelial electrolyte transport, smooth muscle contraction, and cell volume. This gene encodes a member of the potassium channel, voltage-gated, subfamily H. This member is a pore-forming (alpha) subunit of a voltage-gated non-inactivating delayed rectifier potassium channel. This gene is not expressed in differentiating myoblasts. Alternative splicing results in three transcript variants encoding distinct isoforms.

Mutations in this gene have been linked to cases of early onset Epilepsy.(10.1111/epi.12201)
