= KCNA10 =

Protein-coding gene in humans

Identifiers
- Aliases: KCNA10, Kcn1, Kv1.8, potassium voltage-gated channel subfamily A member 10
- External IDs: OMIM: 602420; MGI: 3037820; GeneCards: KCNA10
Available structures
| PDB | Ortholog search: PDBe RCSB |
| PDB | List of PDB id codes 2AFL |

Gene location (Human)
| Chr. | Chromosome 1 (human) |
| Band | 1p13.3 | Start | 110,517,217 bp |
| Band | 1p13.3 | End | 110,519,175 bp |

Gene location (Mouse)
| Chr. | Chromosome 3 (mouse) |
| Band | 3 F2.3|3 46.64 cM | Start | 107,090,372 bp |
| Band | 3 F2.3|3 46.64 cM | End | 107,103,037 bp |
RNA expression pattern
| Bgee | Human / Mouse (ortholog); Top expressed in: stomach; testicle; left testis; right testis / Top expressed in: embryo; quadriceps femoris muscle; skeletal muscle tissue; hypothalamus; muscle of thigh; spleen; More reference expression data |
| BioGPS | n/a |
Gene ontology
| Molecular function | intracellular cyclic nucleotide activated cation channel activity; voltage-gated ion channel activity; ion channel activity; potassium channel activity; voltage-gated potassium channel activity; delayed rectifier potassium channel activity; outward rectifier potassium channel activity |
| Cellular component | plasma membrane; membrane; voltage-gated potassium channel complex; integral component of membrane |
| Biological process | ion transport; transmembrane transport; potassium ion transport; protein homooligomerization; regulation of ion transmembrane transport; potassium ion transmembrane transport; potassium ion export across plasma membrane |
Sources:Amigo / QuickGO
Orthologs
| Databases | NCBI: entry; OMA: entry |
| Species | Human | Mouse |
| Entrez | 3744 | 242151 |
| Ensembl | ENSG00000143105 | ENSMUSG00000042861 |
| UniProt | Q16322 | B2RQA1 |
| RefSeq (mRNA) | NM_005549 | NM_001081140 |
| RefSeq (protein) | NP_005540 | NP_001074609 |
| Location (UCSC) | Chr 1: 110.52 – 110.52 Mb | Chr 3: 107.09 – 107.1 Mb |
| PubMed search |
- Wikidata
| View/Edit Human | View/Edit Mouse |

Potassium voltage-gated channel subfamily A member 10 also known as K_{v}1.8 is a protein that in humans is encoded by the KCNA10 gene. The protein encoded by this gene is a voltage-gated potassium channel subunit.
