= KCNF1 =

Protein-coding gene in the species Homo sapiens

Identifiers
- Aliases: KCNF1, IK8, KCNF, KV5.1, kH1, potassium voltage-gated channel modifier subfamily F member 1
- External IDs: OMIM: 603787; MGI: 2687399; GeneCards: KCNF1

Gene location (Human)
Chr.	Chromosome 2 (human)
Band	2p25.1	Start	10,911,934 bp
Band	2p25.1	End	10,914,225 bp

Gene location (Mouse)
Chr.	Chromosome 12 (mouse)
Band	12|12 A1.1	Start	17,222,101 bp
Band	12|12 A1.1	End	17,226,889 bp
RNA expression pattern
Bgee	Human / Mouse (ortholog); Top expressed in: prefrontal cortex; putamen; nucleus accumbens; right frontal lobe; caudate nucleus; cingulate gyrus; anterior cingulate cortex; dorsolateral prefrontal cortex; Brodmann area 9; orbitofrontal cortex / Top expressed in: temporal lobe; prefrontal cortex; amygdala; piriform cortex; olfactory bulb; superior frontal gyrus; supraoptic nucleus; primary visual cortex; nucleus accumbens; primary motor cortex; More reference expression data
BioGPS	n/a
Gene ontology
Molecular function	ion channel activity; potassium channel activity; voltage-gated ion channel activity; voltage-gated potassium channel activity
Cellular component	integral component of membrane; voltage-gated potassium channel complex; plasma membrane; membrane
Biological process	potassium ion transport; regulation of ion transmembrane transport; protein homooligomerization; ion transport; transmembrane transport; potassium ion transmembrane transport
Sources:Amigo / QuickGO
Orthologs
Databases	NCBI: entry; OMA: entry
Species	Human	Mouse
Entrez	3754	382571
Ensembl	ENSG00000162975	ENSMUSG00000051726
UniProt	Q9H3M0	Q7TSH7
RefSeq (mRNA)	NM_002236	NM_201531
RefSeq (protein)	NP_002227	NP_963289
Location (UCSC)	Chr 2: 10.91 – 10.91 Mb	Chr 12: 17.22 – 17.23 Mb
PubMed search
- Wikidata
View/Edit Human	View/Edit Mouse

Potassium voltage-gated channel subfamily F member 1 is a protein that in humans is encoded by the KCNF1 gene. The protein encoded by this gene is a voltage-gated potassium channel subunit.
