= KCNG1 =

Protein-coding gene in the species Homo sapiens

Identifiers
- Aliases: KCNG1, K13, KCNG, KV6.1, kH2, potassium voltage-gated channel modifier subfamily G member 1
- External IDs: OMIM: 603788; MGI: 3616086; GeneCards: KCNG1

Gene location (Human)
Chr.	Chromosome 20 (human)
Band	20q13.13	Start	51,003,656 bp
Band	20q13.13	End	51,023,107 bp

Gene location (Mouse)
Chr.	Chromosome 2 (mouse)
Band	2|2 H3	Start	168,102,037 bp
Band	2|2 H3	End	168,123,656 bp
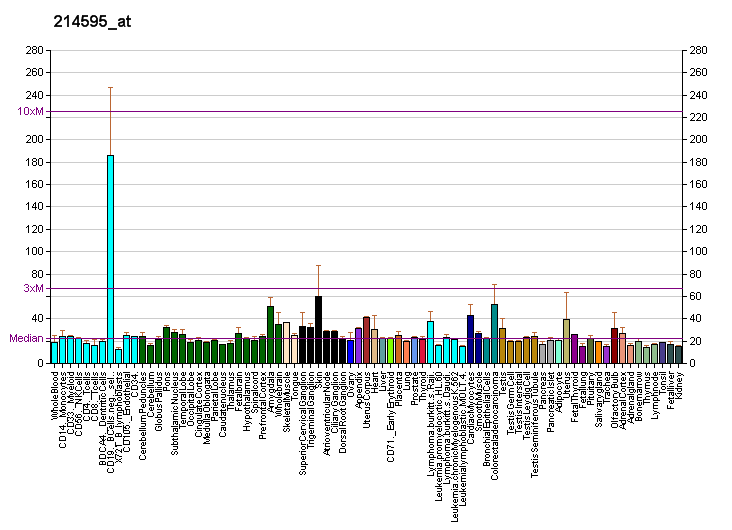
RNA expression pattern
Bgee	Human / Mouse (ortholog); Top expressed in: body of uterus; ventricular zone; left uterine tube; ganglionic eminence; stromal cell of endometrium; buccal mucosa cell; tail of epididymis; myometrium; entorhinal cortex; seminal vesicula / Top expressed in: dentate gyrus of hippocampal formation granule cell; subiculum; hippocampus proper; superior frontal gyrus; facial motor nucleus; temporal lobe; amygdala; visual cortex; primary visual cortex; prefrontal cortex; More reference expression data
BioGPS	More reference expression data
Gene ontology
Molecular function	voltage-gated potassium channel activity; ion channel activity; potassium channel activity; delayed rectifier potassium channel activity; voltage-gated ion channel activity
Cellular component	integral component of membrane; voltage-gated potassium channel complex; plasma membrane; membrane
Biological process	potassium ion transport; regulation of ion transmembrane transport; regulation of delayed rectifier potassium channel activity; protein homooligomerization; ion transport; transmembrane transport; potassium ion transmembrane transport
Sources:Amigo / QuickGO
Orthologs
Databases	NCBI: entry; OMA: entry
Species	Human	Mouse
Entrez	3755	241794
Ensembl	ENSG00000026559	ENSMUSG00000074575
UniProt	Q9UIX4	A2BDX4
RefSeq (mRNA)	NM_002237; NM_172318	NM_001081134; NM_001379458
RefSeq (protein)	NP_002228	NP_001074603; NP_001366387
Location (UCSC)	Chr 20: 51 – 51.02 Mb	Chr 2: 168.1 – 168.12 Mb
PubMed search
- Wikidata
View/Edit Human	View/Edit Mouse

Potassium voltage-gated channel subfamily G member 1 is a protein that in humans is encoded by the KCNG1 gene.

Voltage-gated potassium (Kv) channels represent the most complex class of voltage-gated ion channels from both functional and structural standpoints. Their diverse functions include regulating neurotransmitter release, heart rate, insulin secretion, neuronal excitability, epithelial electrolyte transport, smooth muscle contraction, and cell volume. This gene encodes a member of the potassium channel, voltage-gated, subfamily G. This gene is abundantly expressed in skeletal muscle. Alternative splicing results in at least two transcript variants encoding distinct isoforms.

== See also ==
- Voltage-gated potassium channel
