= KCNG4 =

Protein-coding gene in the species Homo sapiens

Identifiers
- Aliases: KCNG4, KV6.3, KV6.4, potassium voltage-gated channel modifier subfamily G member 4
- External IDs: OMIM: 607603; MGI: 1913983; GeneCards: KCNG4

Gene location (Human)
Chr.	Chromosome 16 (human)
Band	16q24.1	Start	84,218,657 bp
Band	16q24.1	End	84,240,012 bp

Gene location (Mouse)
Chr.	Chromosome 8 (mouse)
Band	8|8 E1	Start	120,350,593 bp
Band	8|8 E1	End	120,362,419 bp
RNA expression pattern
Bgee	Human / Mouse (ortholog); Top expressed in: testicle; amygdala; substantia nigra; hypothalamus; C1 segment; prefrontal cortex; hippocampus proper; putamen; anterior cingulate cortex; nucleus accumbens / Top expressed in: facial motor nucleus; cerebellar cortex; knee joint; lumbar subsegment of spinal cord; vastus lateralis muscle; habenula; triceps brachii muscle; temporal muscle; cerebellar vermis; deep cerebellar nuclei; More reference expression data
BioGPS	n/a
Gene ontology
Molecular function	voltage-gated potassium channel activity; ion channel activity; potassium channel activity; delayed rectifier potassium channel activity; transmembrane transporter binding; voltage-gated ion channel activity
Cellular component	integral component of membrane; voltage-gated potassium channel complex; plasma membrane; membrane
Biological process	potassium ion transport; regulation of ion transmembrane transport; protein homooligomerization; ion transport; transmembrane transport; potassium ion transmembrane transport
Sources:Amigo / QuickGO
Orthologs
Databases	NCBI: entry; OMA: entry
Species	Human	Mouse
Entrez	93107	66733
Ensembl	ENSG00000168418	ENSMUSG00000045246
UniProt	Q8TDN1	Q80XM3
RefSeq (mRNA)	NM_172347; NM_133490	NM_025734; NM_001357210
RefSeq (protein)	NP_758857	NP_080010; NP_001344139
Location (UCSC)	Chr 16: 84.22 – 84.24 Mb	Chr 8: 120.35 – 120.36 Mb
PubMed search
- Wikidata
View/Edit Human	View/Edit Mouse

Potassium voltage-gated channel subfamily G member 4 is a protein that in humans is encoded by the KCNG4 gene. The protein encoded by this gene is a voltage-gated potassium channel subunit.
