= KCNH6 =

Protein-coding gene in the species Homo sapiens

Identifiers
- Aliases: KCNH6, ERG-2, ERG2, HERG2, Kv11.2, hERG-2, potassium voltage-gated channel subfamily H member 6
- External IDs: OMIM: 608168; MGI: 2684139; GeneCards: KCNH6

Gene location (Human)
Chr.	Chromosome 17 (human)
Band	17q23.3	Start	63,523,334 bp
Band	17q23.3	End	63,548,977 bp

Gene location (Mouse)
Chr.	Chromosome 11 (mouse)
Band	11|11 E1	Start	106,008,124 bp
Band	11|11 E1	End	106,034,549 bp
RNA expression pattern
Bgee	Human / Mouse (ortholog); Top expressed in: buccal mucosa cell; gonad; human kidney; testicle; anterior pituitary; islet of Langerhans; jejunal mucosa; prostate; duodenum; renal medulla / Top expressed in: islet of Langerhans; layer of retina; neural layer of retina; optic nerve; molecular layer of cerebellar cortex; epiblast; granular layer; embryo; Purkinje cell; inferior colliculi; More reference expression data
BioGPS	n/a
Gene ontology
Molecular function	voltage-gated potassium channel activity; ion channel activity; potassium channel activity; voltage-gated ion channel activity
Cellular component	integral component of membrane; plasma membrane; membrane; integral component of plasma membrane
Biological process	regulation of membrane potential; potassium ion transport; regulation of ion transmembrane transport; ion transport; transmembrane transport; potassium ion transmembrane transport; regulation of heart rate by cardiac conduction
Sources:Amigo / QuickGO
Orthologs
Databases	NCBI: entry; OMA: entry
Species	Human	Mouse
Entrez	81033	192775
Ensembl	ENSG00000173826	ENSMUSG00000001901
UniProt	Q9H252	n/a
RefSeq (mRNA)	NM_001278919; NM_001278920; NM_030779; NM_173092	NM_001037712
RefSeq (protein)	NP_001265848; NP_001265849; NP_110406; NP_775115	n/a
Location (UCSC)	Chr 17: 63.52 – 63.55 Mb	Chr 11: 106.01 – 106.03 Mb
PubMed search
- Wikidata
View/Edit Human	View/Edit Mouse

Potassium voltage-gated channel subfamily H member 6 is a protein that in humans is encoded by the KCNH6 gene. The protein encoded by this gene is a voltage-gated potassium channel subunit.
