= KCNG2 =

Protein-coding gene in the species Homo sapiens

Identifiers
- Aliases: KCNG2, KCNF2, KV6.2, potassium voltage-gated channel modifier subfamily G member 2
- External IDs: OMIM: 605696; MGI: 3694646; GeneCards: KCNG2

Gene location (Human)
Chr.	Chromosome 18 (human)
Band	18q23	Start	79,797,938 bp
Band	18q23	End	79,900,184 bp

Gene location (Mouse)
Chr.	Chromosome 18 (mouse)
Band	18|18 E3	Start	80,337,761 bp
Band	18|18 E3	End	80,407,469 bp
RNA expression pattern
Bgee	Human / Mouse (ortholog); Top expressed in: sural nerve; anterior cingulate cortex; secondary oocyte; nucleus accumbens; hippocampus proper; Brodmann area 9; amygdala; gastrocnemius muscle; right frontal lobe; blood / Top expressed in: interventricular septum; myocardium of ventricle; primary visual cortex; dentate gyrus of hippocampal formation granule cell; superior frontal gyrus; embryo; yolk sac; hippocampus proper; left ventricle; right kidney; More reference expression data
BioGPS	n/a
Gene ontology
Molecular function	potassium channel activity; delayed rectifier potassium channel activity; voltage-gated ion channel activity; ion channel activity; voltage-gated potassium channel activity
Cellular component	membrane; voltage-gated potassium channel complex; plasma membrane; extracellular exosome; integral component of membrane
Biological process	regulation of heart contraction; regulation of insulin secretion; regulation of ion transmembrane transport; ion transport; potassium ion transport; transmembrane transport; potassium ion transmembrane transport; protein homooligomerization; transport
Sources:Amigo / QuickGO
Orthologs
Databases	NCBI: entry; OMA: entry
Species	Human	Mouse
Entrez	26251	240444
Ensembl	ENSG00000178342	ENSMUSG00000059852
UniProt	Q9UJ96	n/a
RefSeq (mRNA)	NM_012283	NM_001190373
RefSeq (protein)	NP_036415	n/a
Location (UCSC)	Chr 18: 79.8 – 79.9 Mb	Chr 18: 80.34 – 80.41 Mb
PubMed search
- Wikidata
View/Edit Human	View/Edit Mouse

Potassium voltage-gated channel subfamily G member 2 is a protein that in humans is encoded by the KCNG2 gene. The protein encoded by this gene is a voltage-gated potassium channel subunit.
