= KCNV2 =

Protein-coding gene in the species Homo sapiens

Identifiers
- Aliases: KCNV2, KV11.1, Kv8.2, RCD3B, potassium voltage-gated channel modifier subfamily V member 2
- External IDs: OMIM: 607604; MGI: 2670981; GeneCards: KCNV2

Gene location (Human)
Chr.	Chromosome 9 (human)
Band	9p24.2	Start	2,717,510 bp
Band	9p24.2	End	2,730,037 bp

Gene location (Mouse)
Chr.	Chromosome 19 (mouse)
Band	19|19 C1	Start	27,299,988 bp
Band	19|19 C1	End	27,314,579 bp
RNA expression pattern
Bgee	Human / Mouse (ortholog); Top expressed in: sperm; testicle; gonad; retinal pigment epithelium; right testis; left testis; sural nerve; pancreatic ductal cell; right hemisphere of cerebellum; ganglionic eminence / Top expressed in: neural layer of retina; outer nuclear layer; embryo; blastocyst; gastrula; lumbar subsegment of spinal cord; inner nuclear layer; zygote; lumbar spinal ganglion; sternocleidomastoid muscle; More reference expression data
BioGPS	n/a
Gene ontology
Molecular function	ion channel activity; potassium channel activity; voltage-gated ion channel activity; voltage-gated potassium channel activity
Cellular component	integral component of membrane; voltage-gated potassium channel complex; plasma membrane; membrane
Biological process	potassium ion transport; regulation of ion transmembrane transport; protein homooligomerization; ion transport; transmembrane transport; potassium ion transmembrane transport
Sources:Amigo / QuickGO
Orthologs
Databases	NCBI: entry; OMA: entry
Species	Human	Mouse
Entrez	169522	240595
Ensembl	ENSG00000168263	ENSMUSG00000047298
UniProt	Q8TDN2	Q8CFS6
RefSeq (mRNA)	NM_133497	NM_183179
RefSeq (protein)	NP_598004	NP_899002
Location (UCSC)	Chr 9: 2.72 – 2.73 Mb	Chr 19: 27.3 – 27.31 Mb
PubMed search
- Wikidata
View/Edit Human	View/Edit Mouse

Potassium voltage-gated channel subfamily V member 2 is a protein that in humans is encoded by the KCNV2 gene. The protein encoded by this gene is a voltage-gated potassium channel subunit.

== KCNV2 retinopathy ==
KCNV2 retinopathy, historically referred to as cone dystrophy with supernormal rod electroretinogram, is a rare autosomal recessive inherited retinal dystrophy caused by biallelic pathogenic variants in the KCNV2 gene. The condition typically presents in childhood with reduced visual acuity, photophobia, impaired color vision, and progressive central visual loss, while night vision may be relatively preserved in early stages.

A defining feature of the disorder is a characteristic full-field electroretinography profile. Scotopic responses may show disproportionately large b-wave amplitudes at higher stimulus intensities, whereas photopic responses are markedly delayed and reduced. This electrophysiological pattern is considered highly suggestive of KCNV2-associated retinopathy and may be present even when funduscopic or structural retinal changes are minimal.

The KCNV2 gene encodes a modulatory subunit of voltage-gated potassium channels expressed in photoreceptors. Pathogenic variants are thought to disrupt normal photoreceptor signaling, resulting in combined cone dysfunction and abnormal rod responses. Additional descriptive electrophysiological and genetic case documentation has been made available through open research repositories.
