= KCNB2 =

Protein-coding gene in the species Homo sapiens

Identifiers
- Aliases: KCNB2, KV2.2, potassium voltage-gated channel subfamily B member 2
- External IDs: OMIM: 607738; MGI: 99632; GeneCards: KCNB2

Gene location (Human)
Chr.	Chromosome 8 (human)
Band	8q21.11	Start	72,537,225 bp
Band	8q21.11	End	72,938,349 bp

Gene location (Mouse)
Chr.	Chromosome 1 (mouse)
Band	1 A3|1 4.5 cM	Start	15,357,478 bp
Band	1 A3|1 4.5 cM	End	15,793,974 bp
RNA expression pattern
Bgee	Human / Mouse (ortholog); Top expressed in: buccal mucosa cell; testicle; islet of Langerhans; ganglionic eminence; prefrontal cortex; Brodmann area 23; ventricular zone; dorsolateral prefrontal cortex; Brodmann area 9; entorhinal cortex / Top expressed in: olfactory bulb; dentate gyrus of hippocampal formation granule cell; ganglionic eminence; neural tube; mesencephalon; hippocampus proper; ganglion of neuraxis; secondary oocyte; Cortex of frontal lobe; primary visual cortex; More reference expression data
BioGPS	n/a
Gene ontology
Molecular function	potassium channel activity; delayed rectifier potassium channel activity; voltage-gated ion channel activity; ion channel activity; protein heterodimerization activity; voltage-gated potassium channel activity
Cellular component	perikaryon; cell projection; membrane; voltage-gated potassium channel complex; plasma membrane; neuronal cell body membrane; dendrite; integral component of membrane; soma
Biological process	regulation of smooth muscle contraction; regulation of ion transmembrane transport; ion transport; potassium ion transport; transmembrane transport; protein homooligomerization; potassium ion transmembrane transport; protein localization to plasma membrane
Sources:Amigo / QuickGO
Orthologs
Databases	NCBI: entry; OMA: entry
Species	Human	Mouse
Entrez	9312	98741
Ensembl	ENSG00000182674	ENSMUSG00000092083
UniProt	Q92953	A6H8H5
RefSeq (mRNA)	NM_004770	NM_001033195; NM_001098528
RefSeq (protein)	NP_004761	NP_001091998
Location (UCSC)	Chr 8: 72.54 – 72.94 Mb	Chr 1: 15.36 – 15.79 Mb
PubMed search
- Wikidata
View/Edit Human	View/Edit Mouse

Potassium voltage-gated channel subfamily B member 2 is a protein that in humans is encoded by the KCNB2 gene. The protein encoded by this gene is a voltage-gated potassium channel subunit.
