= KCNA7 =

Protein-coding gene in the species Homo sapiens

Identifiers
- Aliases: KCNA7, HAK6, KV1.7, potassium voltage-gated channel subfamily A member 7
- External IDs: OMIM: 176268; MGI: 96664; GeneCards: KCNA7

Gene location (Human)
Chr.	Chromosome 19 (human)
Band	19q13.33	Start	49,067,397 bp
Band	19q13.33	End	49,072,699 bp

Gene location (Mouse)
Chr.	Chromosome 7 (mouse)
Band	7 B3|7 29.3 cM	Start	45,055,077 bp
Band	7 B3|7 29.3 cM	End	45,059,187 bp
RNA expression pattern
Bgee	Human / Mouse (ortholog); Top expressed in: Skeletal muscle tissue of rectus abdominis; vastus lateralis muscle; muscle of thigh; Skeletal muscle tissue of biceps brachii; gastrocnemius muscle; deltoid muscle; tibialis anterior muscle; body of tongue; apex of heart; right auricle of heart / Top expressed in: muscle of thigh; skeletal muscle tissue; quadriceps femoris muscle; zone of skin; lip; esophagus; embryo; heart; spermatocyte; placenta; More reference expression data
BioGPS	n/a
Gene ontology
Molecular function	ion channel activity; potassium channel activity; voltage-gated ion channel activity; voltage-gated potassium channel activity; delayed rectifier potassium channel activity
Cellular component	integral component of membrane; voltage-gated potassium channel complex; plasma membrane; membrane
Biological process	potassium ion transport; regulation of ion transmembrane transport; protein homooligomerization; ion transport; transmembrane transport; potassium ion transmembrane transport
Sources:Amigo / QuickGO
Orthologs
Databases	NCBI: entry; OMA: entry
Species	Human	Mouse
Entrez	3743	16495
Ensembl	ENSG00000104848	ENSMUSG00000038201
UniProt	Q96RP8	Q17ST2
RefSeq (mRNA)	NM_031886	NM_010596
RefSeq (protein)	NP_114092	NP_034726
Location (UCSC)	Chr 19: 49.07 – 49.07 Mb	Chr 7: 45.06 – 45.06 Mb
PubMed search
- Wikidata
View/Edit Human	View/Edit Mouse

Potassium voltage-gated channel subfamily A member 7 also known as K_{v}1.7 is a protein that in humans is encoded by the KCNA7 gene. The protein encoded by this gene is a voltage-gated potassium channel subunit. It may contribute to the cardiac transient outward potassium current (I_{to1}), the main contributing current to the repolarizing phase 1 of the cardiac action potential.
