= KCNA6 =

Protein-coding gene in humans

Identifiers
- Aliases: KCNA6, HBK2, KV1.6, PPP1R96, potassium voltage-gated channel subfamily A member 6
- External IDs: OMIM: 176257; MGI: 96663; GeneCards: KCNA6

Gene location (Human)
| Chr. | Chromosome 12 (human) |
| Band | 12p13.32 | Start | 4,809,334 bp |
| Band | 12p13.32 | End | 4,813,318 bp |

Gene location (Mouse)
| Chr. | Chromosome 6 (mouse) |
| Band | 6 F3|6 61.72 cM | Start | 126,685,292 bp |
| Band | 6 F3|6 61.72 cM | End | 126,717,637 bp |
RNA expression pattern
| Bgee | Human / Mouse (ortholog); Top expressed in: testicle; prefrontal cortex; islet of Langerhans; ventricular zone; Brodmann area 9; Achilles tendon; cingulate gyrus; right frontal lobe; anterior cingulate cortex; ganglionic eminence / Top expressed in: dentate gyrus of hippocampal formation granule cell; lumbar spinal ganglion; medial dorsal nucleus; superior frontal gyrus; lateral hypothalamus; globus pallidus; primary visual cortex; medial vestibular nucleus; trigeminal ganglion; cerebellar cortex; More reference expression data |
| BioGPS | n/a |
Gene ontology
| Molecular function | voltage-gated potassium channel activity; ion channel activity; potassium channel activity; delayed rectifier potassium channel activity; voltage-gated ion channel activity |
| Cellular component | axon terminus; integral component of membrane; voltage-gated potassium channel complex; axon; plasma membrane; potassium channel complex; integral component of plasma membrane; membrane |
| Biological process | potassium ion transport; regulation of ion transmembrane transport; protein homooligomerization; ion transport; transmembrane transport; potassium ion transmembrane transport |
Sources:Amigo / QuickGO
Orthologs
| Databases | NCBI: entry; OMA: entry |
| Species | Human | Mouse |
| Entrez | 3742 | 16494 |
| Ensembl | ENSG00000151079 | ENSMUSG00000038077 |
| UniProt | P17658 | Q61923 |
| RefSeq (mRNA) | NM_002235 | NM_013568 |
| RefSeq (protein) | NP_002226 | NP_038596 |
| Location (UCSC) | Chr 12: 4.81 – 4.81 Mb | Chr 6: 126.69 – 126.72 Mb |
| PubMed search |
- Wikidata
| View/Edit Human | View/Edit Mouse |

Potassium voltage-gated channel subfamily A member 6 also known as K_{v}1.6 is a protein that in humans is encoded by the KCNA6 gene. The protein encoded by this gene is a voltage-gated potassium channel subunit.
