= Index of biophysics articles =

Index of articles on biophysics

This is a list of articles on biophysics.

== 0–9 ==
- 5-HT3 receptor

== A ==
- ACCN1
- ANO1
- AP2 adaptor complex
- Aaron Klug
- Acid-sensing ion channel
- Activating function
- Active transport
- Adolf Eugen Fick
- Afterdepolarization
- Aggregate modulus
- Aharon Katzir
- Alan Lloyd Hodgkin
- Alexander Rich
- Alexander van Oudenaarden
- Allan McLeod Cormack
- Alpha-3 beta-4 nicotinic receptor
- Alpha-4 beta-2 nicotinic receptor
- Alpha-7 nicotinic receptor
- Alpha helix
- Alwyn Jones (biophysicist)
- Amoeboid movement
- Andreas Mershin
- Andrew Huxley
- Animal locomotion
- Animal locomotion on the water surface
- Anita Goel
- Antiporter
- Aquaporin 2
- Aquaporin 3
- Aquaporin 4
- Archibald Hill
- Ariel Fernandez
- Arthropod exoskeleton
- Arthropod leg
- Avery Gilbert

== B ==
- BEST2
- BK channel
- Bacterial outer membrane
- Balance (ability)
- Bat
- Bat wing development
- Bert Sakmann
- Bestrophin 1
- Biased random walk (biochemistry)
- Bioelectrochemical reactor
- Bioelectrochemistry
- Biofilm
- Biological material
- Biological membrane
- Biomechanics
- Biomechanics of sprint running
- Biophysical Society
- Biophysics
- Bird flight
- Bird migration
- Bisindolylmaleimide
- Bleb (cell biology)
- Boris Pavlovich Belousov
- Brian Matthews (biochemist)
- Britton Chance
- Brush border
- Bulk movement

== C ==
- CACNA1G
- CACNA1H
- CACNA1I
- CACNA2D1
- CACNA2D2
- CACNB1
- CACNB2
- CACNB3
- CACNB4
- CACNG1
- CACNG2
- CACNG3
- CACNG4
- CD22
- CD33
- CHRNA10
- CHRNA2
- CHRNA3
- CHRNA4
- CHRNA5
- CHRNA6
- CHRNA7
- CHRNA9
- CHRNB1
- CHRNB2
- CHRNB3
- CHRNB4
- CHRND
- CHRNE
- CHRNG
- CLCA1
- CLCA2
- CLCA3
- CLCA4
- CLCC1
- CLCN1
- CLCN2
- CLCN3
- CLCN4
- CLCN5
- CLCN6
- CLCN7
- CLCNKA
- CLCNKB
- CLIC1
- CLIC2
- CLIC3
- CLIC4
- CLIC5
- CLIC6
- CLNS1A
- CLNS1B
- CNGB1
- Calcium-activated potassium channel
- Calcium-activated potassium channel subunit alpha-1
- Calcium 2-aminoethylphosphate
- Calcium channel
- Canadian Society for Biomechanics
- Cardiolipin
- Carlos Chagas Filho
- Carrier protein
- CatSper1
- CatSper2
- CatSper3
- CatSper4
- Cation channels of sperm
- Cav1.1
- Cav1.2
- Cav1.3
- Cav1.4
- Cav2.1
- Cell adhesion molecule
- Cell membrane
- Cellular component
- Channelome
- Channelomics
- Channelrhodopsin
- Charles Tanford
- Chemorepulsion
- Chloride channel
- Chloroplast membrane
- Cholesterol depletion
- Cholinergic receptor, nicotinic, alpha 1
- Chorioallantoic membrane
- Christian B. Anfinsen
- Cilium
- Climbing
- Cometabolism
- Comparative foot morphology
- Connexon
- Core (anatomy)
- Countercurrent multiplication
- Crenation
- Crista
- Cyclic nucleotide-gated channel alpha 1
- Cyclic nucleotide-gated channel alpha 2
- Cyclic nucleotide-gated channel alpha 3
- Cyclic nucleotide-gated channel alpha 4
- Cyclic nucleotide-gated ion channel
- Cyclic nucleotide gated channel beta 3
- Cys-loop receptors
- Cytolysis

== D ==
- David Cohen (physicist)
- David E. Goldman
- David J. Brenner
- David Keynes Hill
- David Mervyn Blow
- David S. Cafiso
- David States
- Davydov soliton
- Dendrosome
- Denny's paradox
- Depolarization
- Detlev Bronk
- Dopamine transporter
- Douglas Warrick
- Dynamic similarity (Reynolds and Womersley numbers)

== E ==
- Ecomechanics
- Efflux (microbiology)
- Egg white
- Elasticity of cell membranes
- Electrochemical gradient
- Electromethanogenesis
- Electrophysiology
- Electrotonic potential
- Elizabeth Rhoades
- Ena/Vasp homology proteins
- Endocytosis
- Endomembrane system
- Endoskeleton
- Enid MacRobbie
- Enzymatic biofuel cell
- Enzyme kinetics
- Ephraim Katzir
- Eric Kandel
- Erich Sackmann
- Erwin Neher
- Escheriosome
- Eva Nogales
- Excitatory amino-acid transporter
- Exoskeleton
- Extracellular field potential
- Extracellular polymeric substance

== F ==
- F15845
- Filamentous haemagglutinin adhesin
- Filopodia
- Flagellum
- Flapping counter-torque
- Flight feather
- Flying and gliding animals
- Focal adhesion
- Footspeed
- Force platform
- Francis Crick
- Frederic M. Richards
- Fritz-Albert Popp
- Frog battery
- Functional movement
- Functional spinal unit

== G ==
- G. N. Ramachandran
- G12/G13 alpha subunits
- GABAA receptor
- GABRA2
- GABRA3
- GABRA4
- GABRA5
- GABRA6
- GABRB1
- GABRB2
- GABRB3
- GABRD
- GABRE
- GABRG1
- GABRG2
- GABRG3
- GABRP
- GABRQ
- GABRR1
- GABRR2
- GABRR3
- GHK flux equation
- GLRA2
- GLRA3
- GLRA4
- GLRB
- GLUT1
- GLUT8
- GPCR oligomer
- GRIA1
- GRIA2
- GRIA3
- GRIA4
- GRIK1
- GRIK2
- GRIK3
- GRIK4
- GRIK5
- GRIN1
- GRIN2A
- GRIN2B
- GRIN2C
- GRIN2D
- GRIN3A
- GRIN3B
- GRINL1A
- GRINL1B
- G protein
- G protein-coupled inwardly-rectifying potassium channel
- G protein-coupled receptor
- G protein-gated ion channel
- Gamma-aminobutyric acid receptor subunit alpha-1
- Ganglion type nicotinic receptor
- Gating (electrophysiology)
- Geoffrey West
- Georg von Békésy
- George Karreman
- George V. Lauder (biologist)
- Gilbert Stead
- Gliding motility
- Glycerophospholipid
- Glycine receptor, alpha 1
- Glycophosphatidylinositol
- Godfrey Hounsfield
- Gopinath Kartha
- Gq alpha subunit
- Gray's paradox
- Ground reaction force
- Gs alpha subunit
- Gunther O. Hofmann

== H ==
- HCN1
- HCN2
- HCN3
- HCN4
- HCN channel
- HERG
- HTR3A
- HTR3B
- HTR3C
- HTR3D
- HTR3E
- HVCN1
- Hal Anger
- Hans Frauenfelder
- Haptotaxis
- Harold J. Morowitz
- Harry F. Noller
- Henri Atlan
- Hermann Joseph Muller
- Hermann von Helmholtz
- Heterotrimeric G protein
- Hill's muscle model
- Hille equation
- Hodgkin cycle
- Hodgkin–Huxley model
- Homeoviscous adaptation
- Homologous desensitization
- Hopanoids
- Howard Berg
- Hugh Herr
- Human leg
- Human skeletal changes due to bipedalism
- Hydrophobic mismatch
- Hydrostatic skeleton
- Hyperpolarization (biology)

== I ==
- ITPR1
- ITPR2
- ITPR3
- Iatrogenic hypocholesterolemia
- Ichiji Tasaki
- IgSF CAM
- Inner membrane
- Inner mitochondrial membrane
- Insect wing
- Integral membrane protein
- Interbilayer forces in membrane fusion
- Intracellular membranes
- Invadopodia
- Inward-rectifier potassium ion channel
- Ion channel
- Ionotropic effect

== J ==
- J. Murdoch Ritchie
- Jacques-Arsène d'Arsonval
- James D. Watson
- Jane S. Richardson
- Jeremy C. Smith (scientist)
- Jerome Wolken
- Johan Paulsson
- John C. Taschner
- John Desmond Bernal
- John Heuser
- John Hopfield
- John Kendrew
- Journal of Applied Biomechanics
- Julia Goodfellow

== K ==
- KCNA10
- KCNA2
- KCNA3
- KCNA4
- KCNA5
- KCNA6
- KCNA7
- KCNAB1
- KCNAB2
- KCNAB3
- KCNB1
- KCNB2
- KCNC1
- KCNC2
- KCNC3
- KCNC4
- KCND1
- KCNE1L
- KCNE2
- KCNE4
- KCNF1
- KCNG1
- KCNG2
- KCNG3
- KCNG4
- KCNH3
- KCNH4
- KCNH6
- KCNH7
- KCNH8
- KCNIP1
- KCNIP4
- KCNJ10
- KCNJ12
- KCNJ13
- KCNJ14
- KCNJ15
- KCNJ16
- KCNJ3
- KCNJ4
- KCNJ5
- KCNJ6
- KCNJ8
- KCNJ9
- KCNK1
- KCNK10
- KCNK12
- KCNK13
- KCNK15
- KCNK16
- KCNK17
- KCNK18
- KCNK2
- KCNK3
- KCNK4
- KCNK5
- KCNK6
- KCNK7
- KCNK9
- KCNMB1
- KCNMB2
- KCNMB3
- KCNMB4
- KCNN1
- KCNN2
- KCNN4
- KCNQ4
- KCNQ5
- KCNS1
- KCNS2
- KCNS3
- KCNT1
- KCNT2
- KCNV1
- KCNV2
- Kenneth Stewart Cole
- Kim Sung-Hou
- Kir2.1
- Kir2.6
- Kir6.2
- Kv1.1
- KvLQT1
- KvLQT2
- KvLQT3

== L ==
- L-type calcium channel
- Lamellar structure
- Lamellipodium
- Lead (leg)
- Lecithin
- Lee Spetner
- Leslie Barnett
- Ligand-gated ion channel
- Light-gated ion channel
- Lignocellulosic biomass
- Limitations of animal running speed
- Linus Pauling
- Lipid-anchored protein
- Lipid bilayer
- Lipid bilayer characterization
- Lipid bilayer fusion
- Lipid bilayer mechanics
- Lipid bilayer phase behavior
- Lipid raft
- Liposome
- Liquid ordered phase
- List of biophysicists
- List of birds by flight speed
- List of jumping activities
- LocDB
- Locomotor activity
- Locomotor effects of shoes
- Luca Turin
- Lymphocyte homing receptor

== M ==
- M1 protein
- M2 proton channel
- MHC class I
- Magnesium transporter
- Magnetoception
- Magnetosome
- Magnetospirillum
- Magnetotactic bacteria
- Magnetotaxis
- Manfred Eigen
- Marcelo Osvaldo Magnasco
- Marche a petit pas
- Mario Ageno
- Martin Gruebele
- Maurice Wilkins
- Max Delbrück
- Max Perutz
- Mechanics of human sexuality
- Mechanome
- Mechanosensitive channels
- Mechanotaxis
- Membrane biology
- Membrane channel
- Membrane contact site
- Membrane curvature
- Membrane fluidity
- Membrane lipids
- Membrane nanotube
- Membrane potential
- Membrane protein
- Membrane topology
- Membrane transport
- Membranome
- Mesaxon
- Mesosome
- Metachronal rhythm
- Methylhopane
- Microbial ecology
- Microbial fuel cell
- Microsome
- Model lipid bilayer
- Moens–Korteweg equation
- Mohammad-Nabi Sarbolouki
- Molecular motor
- Monoamine transporter
- Motility
- Motor protein
- Mucous membrane
- Mucous membrane of the soft palate
- Muscular hydrostat
- Muscular layer
- Muscularis mucosae
- Myelin-associated glycoprotein
- Myelin sheath gap
- Myofilament
- Mária Telkes

== N ==
- N-Acetylgalactosamine
- N-Acetylglucosamine
- N-Acetylmuramic acid
- N-type calcium channel
- NMDA receptor
- Nanobiomechanics
- Nanodisc
- Nav1.1
- Nav1.2
- Nav1.4
- Nav1.5
- Nectin
- Neurophysins
- Nicolas Rashevsky
- Nicotinic acetylcholine receptor
- Niosome
- Norepinephrine transporter
- Nuclear pore

== O ==
- Optical tweezers
- Oreste Piro
- Origin of avian flight
- Osmoregulation
- Osmotic pressure
- Outer mitochondrial membrane
- Outline of biophysics
- Overhead throwing motion

== P ==
- P-type ATPase
- P-type calcium channel
- P2RX1
- P2RX2
- P2RX3
- P2RX4
- P2RX5
- P2RX6
- P2RX7
- P2X purinoreceptor
- P300-CBP coactivator family
- PF-4840154
- PKD1
- PSORT
- PSORTdb
- PTS1R
- Parkinsonian gait
- Passive transport
- Paul Lauterbur
- Paulien Hogeweg
- Peptide transporter 1
- Peptidoglycan
- Peroxisomal targeting signal
- Perylene
- Peter Mansfield
- Petr Paucek
- Phosphatidylethanolamine
- Phosphatidylglycerol
- Phosphatidylinositol
- Phosphatidylserine
- Physics of skiing
- Pink algae
- Plasma membrane monoamine transporter
- Plasmolysis
- Platelet-derived growth factor receptor
- Pleuroperitoneal
- Podosome
- Polar membrane
- Porosome
- Potassium channel
- Prenylation
- Preprohormone
- Pressure-volume curves
- Primary active transport
- Protein Analysis Subcellular Localization Prediction
- Protein targeting
- Protein–lipid interaction
- Protomer
- Protoplast
- Pseudopeptidoglycan
- Pseudopodia
- Pterygium

== Q ==
- Q-type calcium channel

== R ==
- R-type calcium channel
- ROMK
- RYR1
- RYR3
- Radial spoke
- Receptor (biochemistry)
- Reinhart Heinrich
- Reversal potential
- Richard Ernest Kronauer
- Robert Corey
- Robert G. Shulman
- Robert Haynes
- Robley C. Williams
- Roger Wartell
- Roland Benz
- Role of skin in locomotion
- Rosalind Franklin
- Rosalyn Sussman Yalow
- Rotating locomotion in living systems
- Rudolf Podgornik
- Ryanodine receptor 2

== S ==
- S-layer
- SCN10A
- SCN1B
- SCN2B
- SCN3A
- SCN3B
- SCN4B
- SCN7A
- SCN8A
- SCNN1A
- SCNN1B
- SCNN1D
- SCNN1G
- SIGLEC
- SK3
- SK channel
- Saffman–Delbrück model
- Sammy Lee (scientist)
- Sarcolemma
- Sarcomere
- SecY protein
- Secondary active transport
- Secretory pathway
- Semipermeable membrane
- Sergei Kovalev
- Serotonin transporter
- Serous membrane
- Sessility (zoology)
- Shaker gene
- Sialoadhesin
- Sidney Altman
- Signal patch
- Signal peptide
- Signal peptide peptidase
- Signal recognition particle receptor
- Silent synapse
- Simon Shnoll
- Simtk-opensim
- SkQ
- Small-conductance mechanosensitive channel
- Sodium channel
- Soft tissue
- Soluble cell adhesion molecules
- Solute pumping
- Sorting and assembly machinery
- Sphingomyelin
- Spinal locomotion
- Sports biomechanics
- Steady state (biochemistry)
- Stephen D. Levene
- Stretch-activated ion channel
- Stroma (fluid)
- Structural biology
- Structural genomics
- Structure validation
- Stuart Kauffman
- Submucosa
- Subserosa
- Synthetic ion channels

== T ==
- T-tubule
- T-type calcium channel
- TPCN1
- TPCN2
- TRPA (channel)
- TRPC
- TRPC1
- TRPC2
- TRPC3
- TRPC4AP
- TRPC5
- TRPC6
- TRPC7
- TRPM
- TRPM1
- TRPM2
- TRPM3
- TRPM4
- TRPM5
- TRPM6
- TRPM7
- TRPM8
- TRPML
- TRPN
- TRPP
- TRPP3
- TRPV
- TRPV1
- TRPV2
- TRPV3
- TRPV4
- TRPV5
- TRPV6
- Talin protein
- Tandem pore domain potassium channel
- Tatyana Sapunova
- Tetraspanin
- Theories of general anaesthetic action
- Thomas A. Steitz
- Thomas Gold
- Thylakoid
- Total internal reflection fluorescence microscope
- Tradeoffs for locomotion in air and water
- Transepithelial potential difference
- Transient receptor potential cation channel, member A1
- Transient receptor potential channel
- Transient receptor potential channel-interacting protein database
- Translocon
- Transmembrane channels
- Treadmilling
- Turgor pressure
- Twin-arginine translocation pathway
- Two-pore channel

== U ==
- Undulatory locomotion
- Undulipodium

== V ==
- VCAM-1
- VDAC1
- VDAC2
- VDAC3
- V formation
- Venkatraman Ramakrishnan
- Vertical clinging and leaping
- Vesicle (biology and chemistry)
- Voltage-dependent anion channel
- Voltage-dependent calcium channel
- Voltage-gated ion channel
- Voltage-gated potassium channel
- Voltage-gated potassium channel database
- Voltage-gated proton channel

== W ==
- WALP peptide
- Walter Kauzmann
- Wayne Hendrickson
- WeNMR
- Whiffling
- Wing
- Womersley number
- Work loop

== X ==
- X-ray crystallography
- Xiaowei Zhuang

== Y ==
- Yadin Dudai

== Z ==
- Zinc-activated ion channel
- Zinovii Shulman
