= Taschner =

Taschner or Täschner is a German surname. Notable people with the surname include:

- Gerhard Taschner (1922–1976), Czech-German violinist
- Herbert Taschner, German film editor
- Herbert Täschner (1916–1984), German politician
- Ignatius Taschner (1871–1913), German sculptor and graphic designer
- Ingeborg Taschner, German film editor
- Jack Taschner (born 1978), American baseball relief pitcher
- John C. Taschner (born c. 1930), American radiation biophysicist
- Natalia Pasternak Taschner, Brazilian microbiologist

== See also ==
- 130078 Taschner, minor planet
