= Crisco (disambiguation) =

Crisco is an American brand of shortening that is produced by B&G Foods in St. Bernard, Ohio.

Crisco may also refer to:

- Crisco (album), 2026 album by Miranda Lambert
- Crisco (surname)
- Crisco Branch, river in Union County, North Carolina
