= Cresco =

Cresco may refer to:

== Places ==
- Cresco, Iowa, USA
- Cresco, Pennsylvania, USA

== Other ==
- Cresco (company), a credit card company
- Cresco Labs, a cannabis and medical marijuana company
- PAC Cresco, an aircraft

== See also ==
- Crisco, a shortening brand
- Crisco (surname), a surname
- Ceresco (disambiguation)
