= Sodium in biology =

The sodium–potassium pump, a critical enzyme for regulating sodium and potassium levels in cells

Sodium ions (Na^{+}) are necessary in small amounts for some types of plants, but sodium as a nutrient is more generally needed in larger amounts by animals, due to their use of it for generation of nerve impulses and for maintenance of electrolyte balance and fluid balance. In animals, sodium ions are necessary for the aforementioned functions and for heart activity and certain metabolic functions. The health effects of salt reflect what happens when the body has too much or too little sodium. Characteristic concentrations of sodium in model organisms are: 10 mM in E. coli, 30 mM in budding yeast, 10 mM in mammalian cell and 100 mM in blood plasma.

Additionally, sodium ions are essential to several cellular processes. They are responsible for the co-transport of glucose in the sodium glucose symport, are used to help maintain membrane polarity with the help of the sodium potassium pump, and are paired with water to thin the mucus of the airway lumen when the active Cystic Fibrosis Transport Receptor moves chloride ions into the airway.

== Sodium distribution in species ==
=== Humans ===
The minimum physiological requirement for sodium is between 115 and 500 mg per day depending on sweating due to physical activity, and whether the person is adapted to the climate. Sodium chloride is the principal source of sodium in the diet, and is used as seasoning and preservative, such as for pickling and jerky; most of it comes from processed foods. The Adequate Intake for sodium is 1.2 to 1.5 g per day, but on average people in the United States consume 3.4 g per day, the minimum amount that promotes hypertension. Note that salt contains about 39.3% sodium by mass—the rest being chlorine and other trace chemicals; thus the Tolerable Upper Intake Level of 2.3 g sodium would be about 5.9 g of salt—about 1 teaspoon. The average daily excretion of sodium is between 40 and 220 mEq.

Normal serum sodium levels are between approximately 135 and 145 mEq/L (135 to 145 mmol/L). A serum sodium level of less than 135 mEq/L qualifies as hyponatremia, which is considered severe when the serum sodium level is below 125 mEq/L.

The renin–angiotensin system and the atrial natriuretic peptide indirectly regulate the amount of signal transduction in the human central nervous system, which depends on sodium ion motion across the nerve cell membrane, in all nerves. Sodium is thus important in neuron function and osmoregulation between cells and the extracellular fluid; the distribution of sodium ions are mediated in all animals by sodium–potassium pumps, which are active transporter solute pumps, pumping ions against the gradient, and sodium-potassium channels. Sodium channels are less selective in comparison to potassium channels. Sodium is the most prominent cation in extracellular fluid: in the 15 L of extracellular fluid in a 70 kg human there is around 50 grams of sodium, 90% of the body's total sodium content.

Some potent neurotoxins, such as batrachotoxin, increase the sodium ion permeability of the cell membranes in nerves and muscles, causing a massive and irreversible depolarization of the membranes with potentially fatal consequences. However, drugs with smaller effects on sodium ion motion in nerves may have diverse pharmacological effects that range from anti-depressant to anti-seizure actions.

=== Other animals ===
Since only some plants need sodium and those in small quantities, a completely plant-based diet will generally be very low in sodium. This requires some herbivores to obtain their sodium from salt licks and other mineral sources. The animal need for sodium is probably the reason for the highly conserved ability to taste the sodium ion as "salty." Receptors for the pure salty taste respond best to sodium; otherwise, the receptors respond only to a few other small monovalent cations (Li^{+}, NH^{+}_{4} and somewhat to K^{+}). The calcium ion (Ca^{2+}) also tastes salty and sometimes bitter to some people but, like potassium, can trigger other tastes.

Sodium ions play a diverse and important role in many physiological processes, acting to regulate blood volume, blood pressure, osmotic equilibrium and pH.

=== Plants ===
In C4 plants, sodium is a micronutrient that aids in metabolism, specifically in regeneration of phosphoenolpyruvate (involved in the biosynthesis of various aromatic compounds, and in carbon fixation) and synthesis of chlorophyll. In others, it substitutes for potassium in several roles, such as maintaining turgor pressure and aiding in the opening and closing of stomata. Excess sodium in the soil limits the uptake of water due to decreased water potential, which may result in wilting; similar concentrations in the cytoplasm can lead to enzyme inhibition, which in turn causes necrosis and chlorosis. To avoid these problems, plants developed mechanisms that limit sodium uptake by roots, store them in cell vacuoles, and control them over long distances; excess sodium may also be stored in old plant tissue, limiting the damage to new growth. Though much how excess sodium loading in the xylem is yet to be determined. However, anti porter CHX21 can be attributed to active loading of sodium into the xylem.

== Sodium and water balance ==
Sodium is the primary cation (positively charged ion) in extracellular fluids in animals and humans. These fluids, such as blood plasma and extracellular fluids in other tissues, bathe cells and carry out transport functions for nutrients and wastes. Sodium is also the principal cation in seawater, although the concentration there is about 3.8 times what it is normally in extracellular body fluids.

=== Sodium and water balance in humans ===
Although the system for maintaining optimal salt and water balance in the body is a complex one, one of the primary ways in which the human body keeps track of loss of body water is that osmoreceptors in the hypothalamus sense a balance of sodium and water concentration in extracellular fluids. Relative loss of body water will cause sodium concentration to rise higher than normal, a condition known as hypernatremia. This ordinarily results in thirst. Conversely, an excess of body water caused by drinking will result in too little sodium in the blood (hyponatremia), a condition which is again sensed by the hypothalamus, causing a decrease in vasopressin hormone secretion from the posterior pituitary, and a consequent loss of water in the urine, which acts to restore blood sodium concentrations to normal.

Severely dehydrated persons, such as people rescued from ocean or desert survival situations, usually have very high blood sodium concentrations. These must be very carefully and slowly returned to normal, since too-rapid correction of hypernatremia may result in brain damage from cellular swelling, as water moves suddenly into cells with high osmolar content.

In humans, a high-salt intake was demonstrated to attenuate nitric oxide production. Nitric oxide (NO) contributes to vessel homeostasis by inhibiting vascular smooth muscle contraction and growth, platelet aggregation, and leukocyte adhesion to the endothelium.

=== Urinary sodium ===
Because the hypothalamus/osmoreceptor system ordinarily works well to cause drinking or urination to restore the body's sodium concentrations to normal, this system can be used in medical treatment to regulate the body's total fluid content, by first controlling the body's sodium content. Thus, when a powerful diuretic drug is given which causes the kidneys to excrete sodium, the effect is accompanied by an excretion of body water (water loss accompanies sodium loss). This happens because the kidney is unable to efficiently retain water while excreting large amounts of sodium. In addition, after sodium excretion, the osmoreceptor system may sense lowered sodium concentration in the blood and then direct compensatory urinary water loss in order to correct the hyponatremic (low blood sodium) state.

== Sodium at a cellular level ==
=== Sodium-potassium pump ===
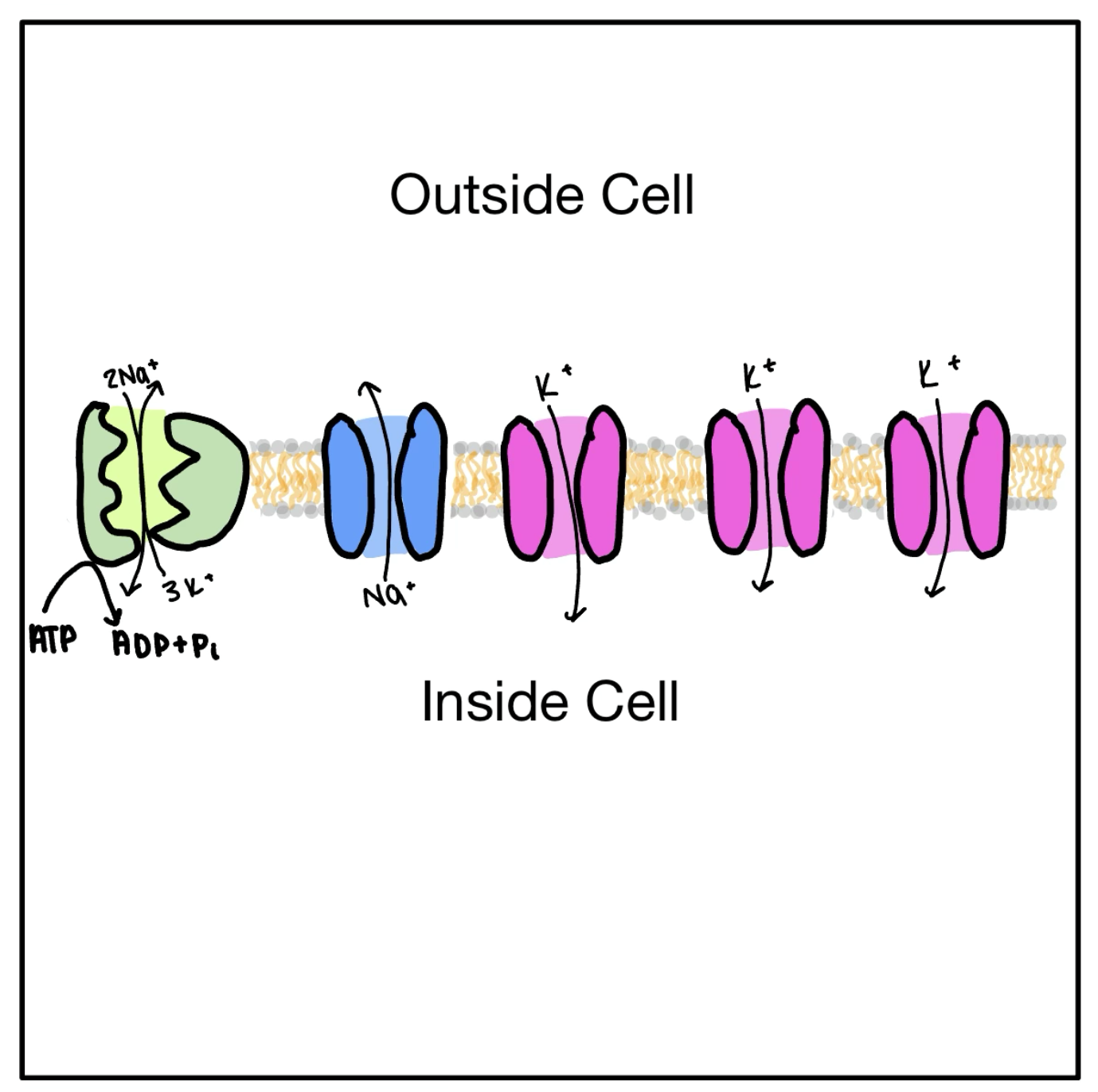
Here is a hand-drawn depiction of a membrane bound sodium-potassium pump and sodium and potassium ion channels can be seen along with the directed movement of the ions indicated by arrows.

The sodium-potassium pump works with the sodium and potassium leak channels to maintain the membrane potential between the cell and the extracellular space. Sodium moves down a concentration gradient from the extracellular fluid into the cytosol through leak channels. Potassium moves down its concentration gradient from the cytosol into the extracellular fluid through its own channels. In order to maintain the membrane potential, the sodium-potassium pump acts as a form of direct active transport where the hydrolysis of ATP to ADP and an inorganic phosphate at the P-type ATPase moves three sodium ions back out of the cell and two potassium ions into the cell.

The sodium-potassium pump plays a large role in neural signaling due to the maintenance of cell membrane potential. This creates an action potential that causes the neurons to polarize and depolarize their membranes by opening and closing the voltage gated channels: this alters voltage potential and leads to neurotransmitter secretion and ultimately signal transmission.

When the pump fails to function, patients are susceptible to illnesses like heart failure and chronic obstructive lung disease (COLD). Those who experienced an event of heart failure had on average, a 40% lower concentration of the sodium-potassium ATPase. This lack of polarization of the membrane leads to an inability of action potentials to propagate at their usual rate, leading to a lowered hear rate and potentially heart failure. In COLD diagnoses, a majority of patients found to have a lowered amount of magnesium and potassium also had a decreased concentration of the sodium-potassium pump in skeletal and smooth muscle during respiratory failure. COLD is treatable in the short term by glucocorticoid which up-regulates the sodium-potassium pump, helping to support muscle endurance and increase muscle activity during these episodes of respiratory failure.

=== Sodium-glucose symporter ===
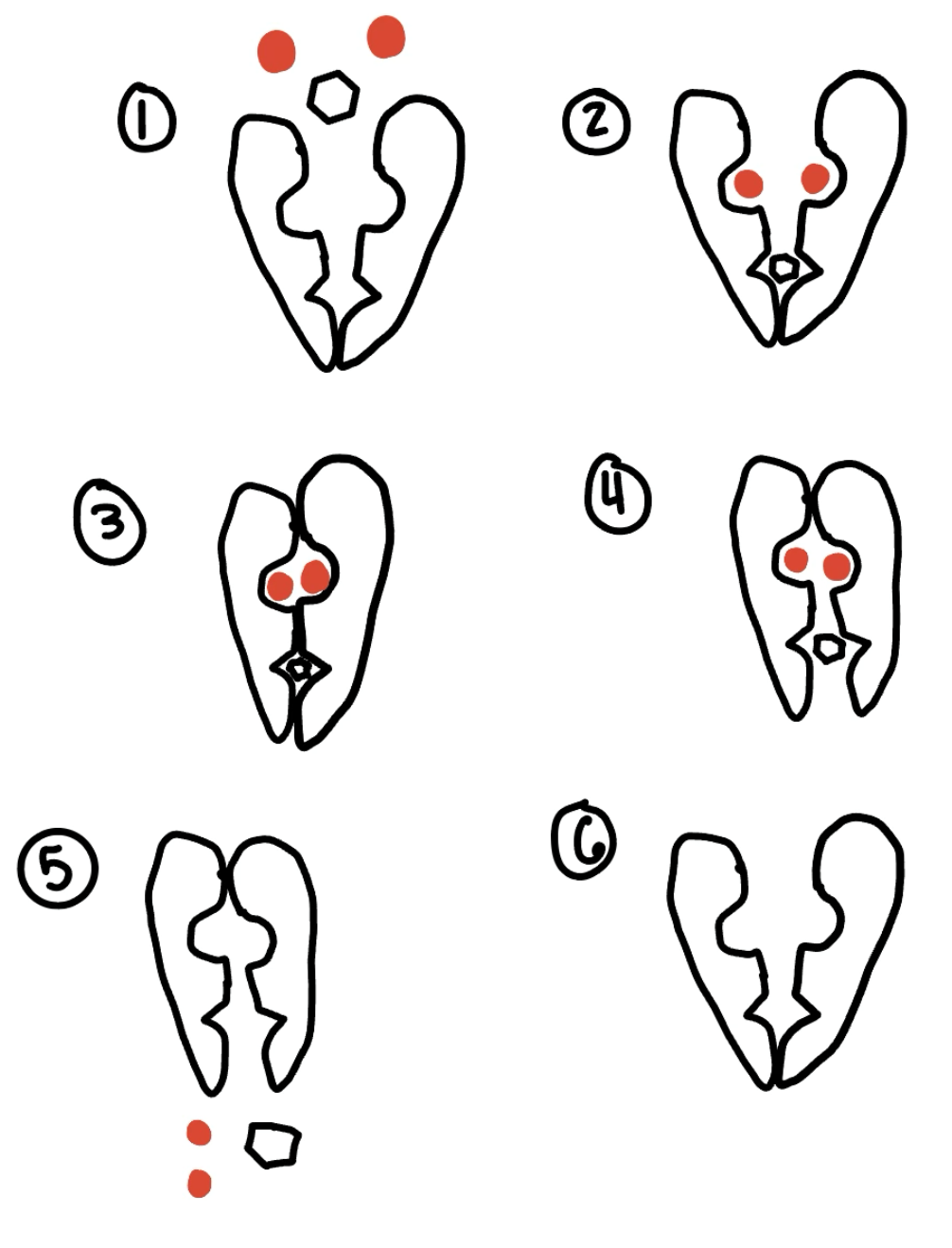
The sodium-glucose symporter is initially opened to the extracellular matrix. Once 2 sodium and the glucose bind, the conformation closes to the extracellular matrix and opens to the cytosol where the sodium and glucose are released. The confirmation of the symporter than returns to the initial confirmation.

In the sodium-glucose symporter, sodium moves down its concentration gradient to move glucose up its concentration gradient. Sodium has a greater concentration outside of the cell, and binds to the symporter, which is in its outward facing conformation. Once sodium is bound, glucose can bind from the extracellular space, causing the symporter to switch into the occluded formation (closed) before opening to the inside of the cell and releasing the two sodium ions and the one glucose molecule. Once both are released, the symporter re-orients itself to the outward facing conformation and the process starts all over again. A major example of up-regulation of the sodium-glucose symporter is seen in patients with type 2 diabetes, where there is roughly a 3-4 fold up-regulation of the sodium-glucose symporter (SGLT1). This leads to an influx of glucose into the cell and results in hyperglycemia.

=== Sodium's role in the Cystic Fibrosis Transport Regulator (CFTR) ===
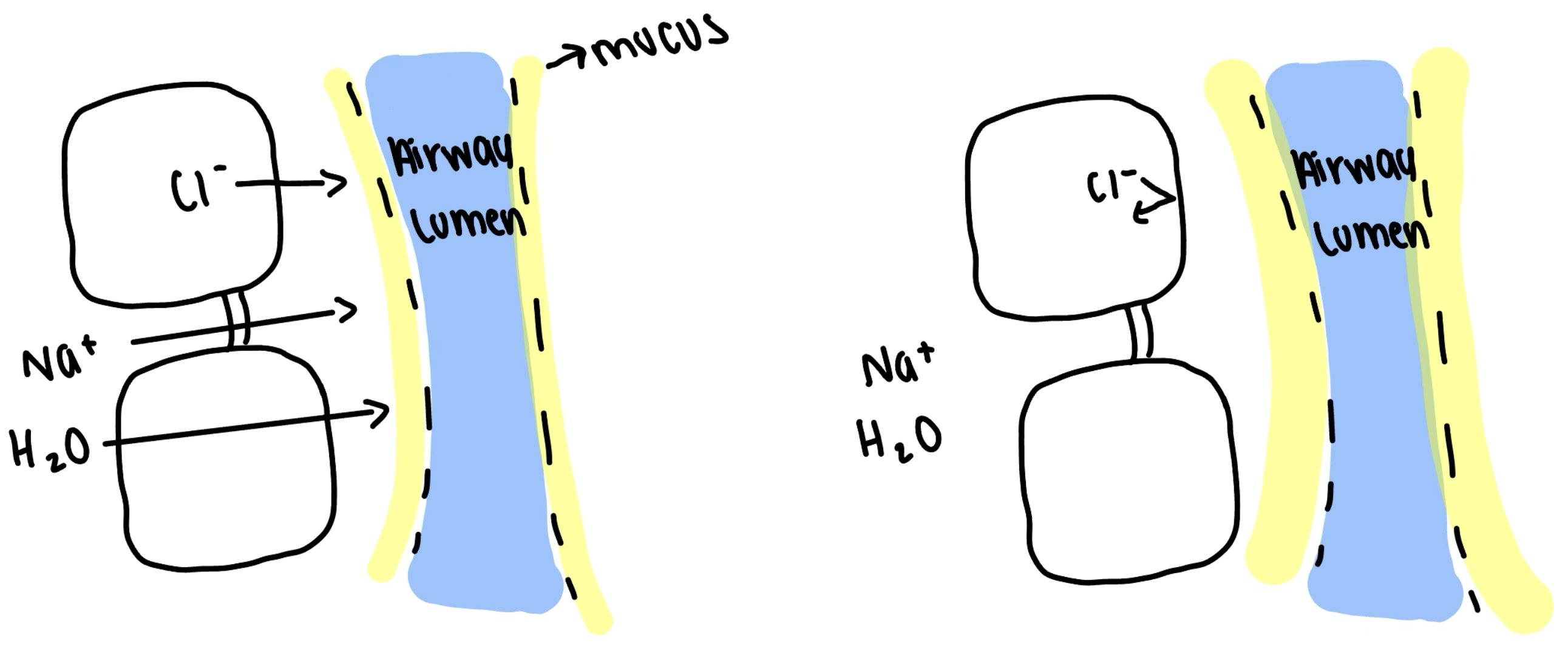
Pictured on the left is the working CFTR where the ions are able to move through the cells and the mucus is thinned out. On the right is a not functioning CFTR that prevents the movements of ions and causes thicker mucus in the airway lumen.

The Cystic Fibrosis Transport Regulator (CFTR) works by binding two ATP to the A1 and A2, ATP-binding domain. This opens the CFTR channel and allows chloride ions to flow into the lungs and airway lumen. This influx of negatively charged chloride ions into the airway lumen causes sodium to move into the airway lumen to balance the negative charge. Water then moves in with the sodium to balance the osmotic pressure and ultimately leads to the thinning of mucus. In cases of Cystic Fibrosis, the CFTR is defective and only binds a single ATP, leading to the channel failing to open and preventing chloride ions from diffusing into the airway lumen. Since chloride ions cannot diffuse in, there is no movement of sodium into the airway lumen, and no need for water to move into the lumen, leading to thick mucus that clogs and infects the airway lumen.

== See also ==
- Biology and pharmacology of chemical elements
- Action potential – Neuron communication by electric impulses
- Calcium in biology – Use of calcium by organisms
- Iodine in biology – Use of Iodine by organisms
- Magnesium in biology – Use of magnesium by organisms
- Membrane potential – Electric potential difference between interior and exterior of a biological cell
- Potassium in biology – Use of potassium by organisms
- Selenium in biology – Effect of chemical element
