= Ceresco =

There are a number of places called Ceresco in the United States:

- Ceresco, Michigan
- Ceresco Township, Minnesota
- Ceresco, Nebraska
- Ceresco, Wisconsin (1844–1858), site of the Wisconsin Phalanx, today part of Ripon, Wisconsin

== See also ==
- Cresco (disambiguation)
