= Joseph Crisco =

American engineer

Joseph Crisco is an American engineer, currently the Henry F. Lippitt Professor of Orthopedics and Professor of Engineering at Brown University and also Editor in Chief of Journal of Applied Biomechanics.
