= Mohammad-Nabi Sarbolouki =

Iranian scientist and educator (died 2009)

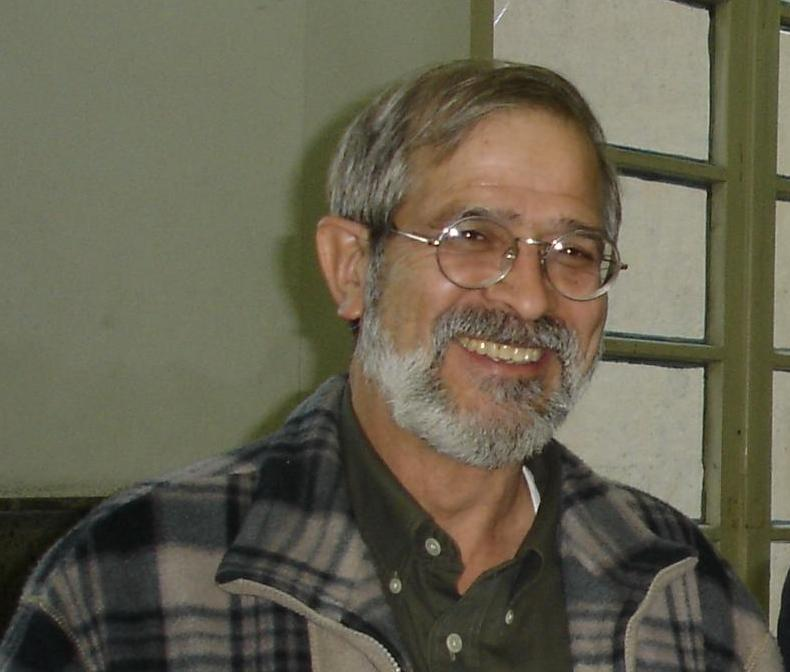
Mohammad Nabi Sarbolouki, prominent scientist and educator

Mohammad-Nabi Sarbolouki (Persian: محمدنبی سربلوکی) was a distinguished Iranian biophysicist and polymer chemist and one of the most influential individuals behind modern scientific movement in Iran. He was known as the inventor of a DNA vehicle called "dendrosome". Sarbolouki was one of the main founders and pioneers of nano science, biomaterials, biotechnology and biophysics in Iran.

Sarbolouki studied chemistry at Tehran University and did his PhD in Macromolecular Physical Chemistry at Polytechnic University of New York. He then spent two years at Michigan State University as a postdoctoral fellow. Sarbolouki then joined NASA where he worked as a group leader till 1981.

Sarbolouki had numerous publications and patents on various subjects ranging from engineering to basic sciences. He initiated biomaterial research in Iran and was among the first to do structural biology in the country. He made significant contribution to the field of lipid bilayer membranes and liposomes, biodegradable polymers, tissue engineering, nanospheres (magnetic/fluorescent) and drug delivery.

Sarbolouki was of the founding members of Iranian Society of Nanotechnology, Iranian Society of Proteomics and Iranian Chemical Society. He founded the first Biomaterial Research Center in Iran as well as National Research Center for Genetic Engineering and Biotechnology, ICGEB headquarter in Iran.

Sarbolouki was involved in science policy making at the national level and was instrumental in the advancement of interdisciplinary and applied research in Iran.

Professor Sarbolouki was the editor of Molecules, an international journal devoted to synthetic organic chemistry and natural product chemistry. He was also chief editor of Iranian Journal of Chemistry & Chemical Engineering.

Professor Sarbolouki died on September 1, 2009, and his body was buried in Tehran Cemeteries, at the block for national legends on September 2, 2009. The Vice President and Minister of Science delivered messages of condolence and his burial was attended by numerous Iranian academics, scholars and students.

== Awards and distinctions ==
- National Biotechnology Award, (2000)
- Iranian Academy of Science, Associate member (1992–2008)
- Iranian Academy of Literature, Associate member (2003–2008)
- President, Institute of Biophysics and Biochemistry.
- President, Biomaterial Research Center
- Chairman, Faculty of Sciences, University of Tehran

== Selected publications ==
- Dendrosome:
  - Dendrosomes: a novel family of vehicles for transfection and therapy. Journal of Chemical Technology & Biotechnology. Volume 75 Issue 10, Pages 919 - 922 (2000)
  - Dendrosomes as novel gene porters-III. Journal of Chemical Technology & Biotechnology Volume 83 Issue 6, Pages 912 - 920 (2008)
- Structural biology:
  - Functional and structural characterization of a novel member of the natriuretic family of peptides from the venom of Pseudocerastes persicus. FEBS Letters Volume 557 Issue 1-3, Pages 104-108 (2004)
  - Solution structure of long neurotoxin NTX-1 from the venom of Naja naja oxiana by 2D-NMR spectroscopy. European Journal of Biochemistry Volume 271 Issue 23-24 Pages 4950-4957 (2004)
- Biomaterials:
  - Synthesis and thermal behavior of triblock copolymers from L-lactide and ethylene glycol with long center PEG block. Journal of Applied Polymer Science Volume 68 Issue 12 Pages 1949-1954 (1998)
  - Synthesis and characterization of novel biodegradable triblock copolymers from L-lactide, glycolide, and PPG. Journal of Applied Polymer Science Volume 73 Issue 5 Pages 633-637 (1999)
  - Synthesis and characterization of ABA triblock and novel multiblock copolymers from ethylene glycol, L-lactide, and epsilon-caprolactone. Journal of Applied Polymer Science Volume 83 Issue 10 Pages 2072-2081 (2002)
  - Mass preparation and characterization of alginate microspheres. Process Biochemistry Volume 35 Issue 9 Pages 885-888 (2000)
- Membranes:
  - A simple method for preparation of immuno-magnetic liposomes. International Journal of Pharmaceutics Volume 215 Issue 1-2 Pages 45–50 (2001)
- Chromatography:
  - Separation and Indirect Detection of Amino-acids by Reversed Phase ion-pair Chromatography. Journal of Chromatographic Science Volume 31 Issue 11 Pages 480-485 (1993)
  - Determination of pore/protein size via electrophoresis and slit sieve model. Electrophoresis Volume 25 Issue 17 Pages 2907-2911 (2004)

== See also ==
- Science in Iran
- Jet Propulsion Laboratory
- Institute of Biochemistry and Biophysics
