= Wolfgang Helfrich =

German physicist and inventor (1932–2025)

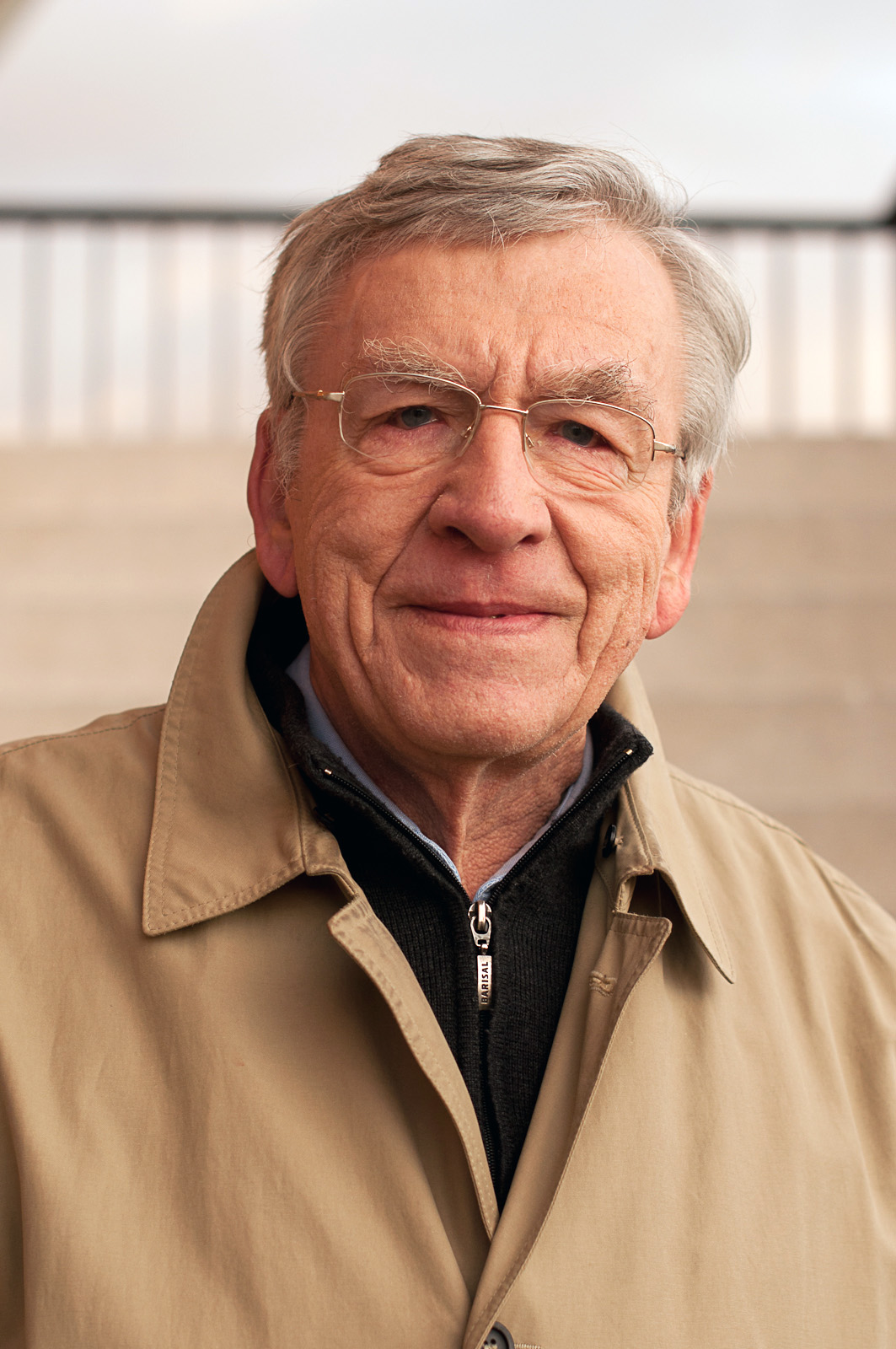
- Born: 26 March 1932; Munich, Bavaria, Germany
- Died: 28 September 2025 (aged 93); Berlin, Germany
- Occupations: Physicist, inventor

Wolfgang Helfrich (26 March 1932 – 28 September 2025) was a German physicist and inventor who made contributions to twisted-nematic liquid crystal technology, which is used to produce a variety of modern LCD electronic displays, and in the field of biomembranes.

== Career ==
Helfrich studied physics in Munich, Göttingen, and Tübingen. Helfrich joined RCA in 1967, became interested in Charles-Victor Mauguin's twisted structure, and thought it might be used to create an electronic display. However, RCA showed little interest, because they felt that any effect that used two polarizers would also have a large amount of light absorption, requiring it to be brightly lit.

In 1970, Helfrich left RCA and joined the Central Research Laboratories of Hoffmann-LaRoche in Switzerland, where he teamed up with Swiss physicist Martin Schadt, a solid-state physicist. Schadt built a sample with electrodes and a twisted version of a liquid-crystal material called PEBAB (p-ethoxybenzylidene-p'-aminobenzonitrile), which Helfrich had reported in prior studies at RCA, as part of their guest-host experiments.

From 1973 until his retirement in 1997, Helfrich worked for Free University of Berlin. In 1973, Wolfgang Helfrich published the first complete description of the bending energy of membranes. In 1978, he set up the first theory of the steric repulsion of membranes caused by shape fluctuations. In the 1970s and following decades, Wolfgang Helfrich made numerous theoretical and experimental contributions to membrane physics, in particular on vesicle shapes, membrane shape fluctuations, and the effect of electric fields on vesicles.

Helfrich lived in Berlin where he died on 28 September 2025, at the age of 93.

== Works ==
- Untersuchungen an raumladungsbeschränkten Defektelektronenströmen in Anthrazen - Munich 1961
- Raumladungsbeschränkte Ströme in Anthrazen als Mittel zur Bestimmung der Beweglichkeit von Defektelektronen - Munich 1961
- Space-charge-limited and volume-controlled currents in organic solid - Munich 1967
- Elastic properties of lipid bilayers : theory and possible experiments, Zeitschrift für Naturforschung C, vol. 28, 1973
- Deformation of lipid bilayer spheres by electric fields, Zeitschrift für Naturforschung C, vol. 29, 1974.
- Steric interactions of fluid membranes in multilayer systems, Zeitschrift für Naturforschung 33a, 305, 1978.
- Liquid Crystals of One- and Two-Dimensional Order - Berlin, Heidelberg : Springer Berlin Heidelberg, 1980
- Elasticity and thermal undulations of fluid films of amphiphiles, in: Liquides aux interfaces, École d'été de physique théorique, Les Houches, Session XLVIII, Université scientifique et médicale de Grenoble, Nato Advanced Study Institute, Institut national polytechnique de Grenoble, 1988, S. 209–238.

== Awards ==
- 1976 EPS Europhysics Prize
- 1993 Wolfgang Ostwald Prize
- 2008 IEEE Jun-ichi Nishizawa Medal
- 2012 Sackler Prize
- 2012 Charles Stark Draper Prize for Engineering
