= POLR2M =

Protein-coding gene in humans

Identifiers
- Aliases: POLR2M, GCOM1, GRINL1A, Gdown, Gdown1, polymerase (RNA) II subunit M, RNA polymerase II subunit M
- External IDs: OMIM: 606485; MGI: 107282; GeneCards: POLR2M

Gene location (Human)
Chr.	Chromosome 15 (human)
Band	15q21.3	Start	57,706,695 bp
Band	15q21.3	End	57,782,762 bp

Gene location (Mouse)
Chr.	Chromosome 9 (mouse)
Band	9 D|9 39.85 cM	Start	71,385,719 bp
Band	9 D|9 39.85 cM	End	71,393,217 bp
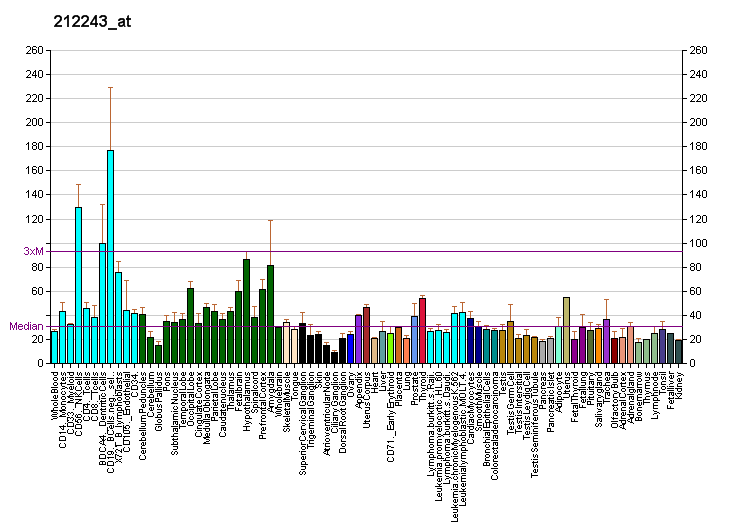

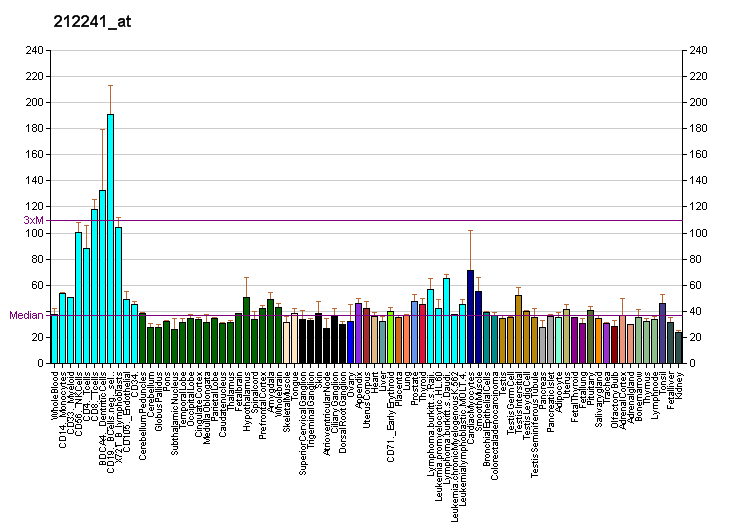
RNA expression pattern
Bgee	Human / Mouse (ortholog); Top expressed in: germinal epithelium; muscle of thigh; Achilles tendon; tail of epididymis; Skeletal muscle tissue of rectus abdominis; secondary oocyte; Epithelium of choroid plexus; vena cava; optic nerve; biceps brachii / Top expressed in: somite; mandibular prominence; hand; tail of embryo; genital tubercle; maxillary prominence; muscle of thigh; foot; abdominal wall; choroid plexus of fourth ventricle; More reference expression data
BioGPS	More reference expression data
Gene ontology
Molecular function	DNA-directed 5'-3' RNA polymerase activity; protein binding
Cellular component	RNA polymerase II, holoenzyme; soma; nuclear envelope; nucleus; cytoplasm; cell junction; plasma membrane; Z discdkac; cytoskeleton; membrane; I band; cortical actin cytoskeleton; extrinsic component of cytoplasmic side of plasma membrane; intracellular anatomical structure
Biological process	maintenance of ER location; RNA biosynthetic process; intracellular signal transduction
Sources:Amigo / QuickGO
Orthologs
Databases	NCBI: entry; OMA: entry
Species	Human	Mouse
Entrez	81488	28015
Ensembl	ENSG00000255529	ENSMUSG00000032199
UniProt	P0CAP2; Q6EEV4; P0CAP1	Q6P6I6
RefSeq (mRNA)	NM_001018102; NM_015532	NM_001164793; NM_178602
RefSeq (protein)	NP_001018112; NP_056347; NP_001018112.1; NP_056347.1; NP_001018110 NP_689664	NP_001158265; NP_848717
Location (UCSC)	Chr 15: 57.71 – 57.78 Mb	Chr 9: 71.39 – 71.39 Mb
PubMed search
- Wikidata
View/Edit Human	View/Edit Mouse

DNA-directed RNA polymerase II subunit GRINL1A is a protein that in humans is encoded by the POLR2M gene (previously GRINL1A). This protein is a component of Pol II(G), a variant form of the RNA polymerase II complex.

This gene (GRINL1A) is part of a complex transcript unit that includes the gene for GRINL1A combined protein (Gcom1). Transcription of this gene occurs at a downstream promoter, with at least three different alternatively spliced variants, grouped together as Gdown for GRINL1A downstream transcripts. The Gcom1 gene uses an upstream promoter for transcription and also has multiple alternatively spliced variants.

== See also ==
- NMDA receptor
