= Mucous membrane of the soft palate =

Tissue of the roof of the mouth

The mucous membrane of the soft palate is thin, and covered with stratified squamous epithelium on both surfaces, except near the pharyngeal ostium of the auditory tube, where it is columnar and ciliated.

According to Klein, the mucous membrane on the nasal surface of the soft palate in the fetus is covered throughout by columnar ciliated epithelium, which subsequently becomes squamous; some anatomists state that it is covered with columnar ciliated epithelium, except at its free margin, throughout life.

Beneath the mucous membrane on the oral surface of the soft palate is a considerable amount of adenoid tissue.

The palatine glands form a continuous layer on its posterior surface and around the uvula. They are primarily mucus-secreting glands, as opposed to serous or mixed secreting glands.
