= F15845 =

Cardiac drug

Legal status
- Legal status: Investigational

Identifiers
- IUPAC name: (3R)-N-[(2S)-3-(2-Methoxyphenyl)sulfanyl-2-methylpropyl]-3,4-dihydro-2H-1,5-benzoxathiepin-3-amine
- CAS Number: 470454-73-0
- PubChem CID: 11566989
- ChemSpider: 9741760
- UNII: 937TSH5BGH
- ChEMBL: ChEMBL511058
- CompTox Dashboard (EPA): DTXSID001116393

Chemical and physical data
- Formula: C_{20}H_{25}NO_{2}S_{2}
- Molar mass: 375.55 g·mol^{−1}
- 3D model (JSmol): Interactive image
- SMILES: C[C@@H](CN[C@@H]1COC2=CC=CC=C2SC1)CSC3=CC=CC=C3OC
- InChI: InChI=1S/C20H25NO2S2/c1-15(13-24-19-9-5-3-7-17(19)22-2)11-21-16-12-23-18-8-4-6-10-20(18)25-14-16/h3-10,15-16,21H,11-14H2,1-2H3/t15-,16+/m0/s1; Key:HZQHAAFWVRDHMZ-JKSUJKDBSA-N

F15845 is a cardiac drug proposed to have beneficial effects for the treatment of angina pectoris, arrhythmias and ischemia by inhibiting the persistent sodium current. The drug, currently in phase II of clinical trials, targets the persistent sodium current with selectivity and produces minimal adverse effects in current experimental studies.

== Persistent sodium current ==
In the cardiac myocyte, the persistent sodium current corresponds to the delayed inactivation of the major sodium channel Nav1.5. In a functional muscle cell, this sodium channel plays an important role in the propagation of an action potential through the heart. Sodium influx is a key component in the initial depolarisation of the cell, followed by quick inactivation to allow for a plateau phase and calcium influx. Persistent sodium current prevents this normal action potential pattern, resulting in a prolonged action potential and increased sodium levels within the cardiac myocyte. Under these conditions the heart is more susceptible to damage and malfunctions. Inhibition of the persistent sodium current is a novel therapeutic target to prevent long term changes in the heart resulting from ischemia. Hypoxia, heart failure and oxygen derived free radicals are all factors believed to activate the persistent sodium current. In ischemia, the major damage to the cardiac myocyte, due to hypoxia, is seen following the reperfusion of blood. High intracellular sodium levels from the persistent current results in high influx of calcium during reperfusion; leading to calcium overload, hypercontraction and cardiac myocyte death. The main contributor to this calcium overload is the sodium/calcium exchanger working in reverse, driven by the high intracellular concentration of sodium exchanging out of the cell with the extracellular calcium moving in.

== Pharmacology ==
F15845 has been shown to selectively inhibit the persistent sodium current of Nav1.5 exerting cardioprotective effects following ischemia. In vitro testing showed minimal effects of F15845 on other important ion channels of the heart, including major Ca2+ and K+ channels. This characteristic is thought to account for the limited effect of F15845 to change other heart parameters such as basal cardiac function, hemodynamic functions and ventricular fibrillation. F15845 was also shown to exert improved effects when the membrane potential was depolarized, by acting on the extracellular side of the channel. This effect of the F15845 on the depolarised state of the persistent sodium current renders the drug particularly useful in ischemic conditions when the cardiac cell is depolarised.

== F15845 and angina ==
The F15845 drug has been developed as a potential drug for therapy of angina pectoris. Current anti-anginal drugs, aiming to prevent ischemic events resulting from angina, fail to completely relieve symptoms without further cardiovascular effects (Vacher et al., 2009). In addition to F15845 being more selective to the persistent sodium current compared to its counterparts, it has also been shown to inhibit ST segment changes in the canine model of angina.
