= Elasticity of cell membranes =

Ability of cell membranes to deform elastically

A cell membrane defines a boundary between a cell and its environment. The primary constituent of a membrane is a phospholipid bilayer that forms in a water-based environment due to the hydrophilic nature of the lipid head and the hydrophobic nature of the two tails. In addition there are other lipids and proteins in the membrane, the latter typically in the form of isolated rafts.

Of the numerous models that have been developed to describe the deformation of cell membranes, a widely accepted model is the fluid mosaic model proposed by Singer and Nicolson in 1972. In this model, the cell membrane surface is modeled as a two-dimensional fluid-like lipid bilayer where the lipid molecules can move freely. The proteins are partially or fully embedded in the lipid bilayer. Fully embedded proteins are called integral membrane proteins because they traverse the entire thickness of the lipid bilayer. These communicate information and matter between the interior and the exterior of the cell. Proteins that are only partially embedded in the bilayer are called peripheral membrane proteins. The membrane skeleton is a network of proteins below the bilayer that links with the proteins in the lipid membrane.

== Elasticity of closed lipid vesicles ==
The simplest component of a membrane is the lipid bilayer which has a thickness that is much smaller than the length scale of the cell. Therefore, the lipid bilayer can be represented by a two-dimensional mathematical surface. In 1973, based on similarities between lipid bilayers and nematic liquid crystals, Helfrich proposed the following expression for the curvature energy per unit area of the closed lipid bilayer

$f_c = \frac{k_c}{2}(2H-c_0)^2+\bar{k}\,K$

1

where $k_c,\bar{k}$ are bending rigidities, $c_0$ is the spontaneous curvature of the membrane, and $H$ and $K$ are the mean and Gaussian curvature of the membrane surface, respectively.

The free energy of a closed bilayer under the osmotic pressure $\Delta p$ (the outer pressure minus the inner one) as:

$F_H=\int (f_c+\lambda)\, dA+\Delta p\int dV$

2

where dA and dV are the area element of the membrane and the volume element enclosed by the closed bilayer, respectively, and λ is the Lagrange multiplier for area inextensibility of the membrane, which has the same dimension as surface tension. By taking the first order variation of above free energy, Ou-Yang and Helfrich derived an equation to describe the equilibrium shape of the bilayer as:

$\Delta p-2\lambda H+k_c(2H+c_0)(2H^2-c_0H-2K)+2k_c\nabla^2 H=0$

3

They also obtained that the threshold pressure for the instability of a spherical bilayer was

$\Delta p_{c}\propto k_c/R^3$

4

where $R$ being the radius of the spherical bilayer.

Using the shape equation (3) of closed vesicles, Ou-Yang predicted that there was a lipid torus with the ratio of two generated radii being exactly $\sqrt{2}$. His prediction was soon confirmed by the experiment Additionally, researchers obtained an analytical solution to (3) which explained the classical problem, the biconcave discoidal shape of normal red blood cells. In the last decades, the Helfrich model has been extensively used in computer simulations of vesicles, red blood cells and related systems. From a numerical point-of-view bending forces stemming from the Helfrich model are very difficult to compute as they require the numerical evaluation of fourth-order derivatives and, accordingly, a large variety of numerical methods have been proposed for this task.

== Elasticity of open lipid membranes ==
The opening-up process of lipid bilayers by talin was observed by Saitoh et al. arose the interest of studying the equilibrium shape equation and boundary conditions of lipid bilayers with free exposed edges. Capovilla et al., Tu and Ou-Yang carefully studied this problem. The free energy of a lipid membrane with an edge $C$ is written as

$F_o=\int (f_c+\lambda) dA+\gamma\oint_C ds$

5

where $ds$ and $\gamma$ represent the arclength element and the line tension of the edge, respectively. This line tension is a function of dimension and distribution of molecules comprising the edge, and their interaction strength and range. The first order variation gives the shape equation and boundary conditions of the lipid membrane:

$k_{c}(2H+c_{0})(2H^{2}-c_{0}H-2K)-2\lambda H+k_{c}\nabla^{2}(2H)=0$

6

$\left. \left[ k_{c}(2H+c_{0})+\bar{k}k_n\right]\right\vert _{C}=0$

7

$\left. \left[ -2k_{c}\frac{\partial H}{\partial\mathbf{e}_2}+\gamma k_n+\bar{k}\frac{d\tau_g}{ds}\right]\right\vert _{C}=0$

8

$\left. \left[ \frac{k_{c}}{2}(2H+c_{0})^{2}+\bar{k}K+\lambda+\gamma k_{g}\right]\right\vert _{C}=0$

9

where $k_n$, $k_g$, and $\tau_g$ are normal curvature, geodesic curvature, and geodesic torsion of the boundary curve, respectively. $\mathbf{e}_2$ is the unit vector perpendicular to the tangent vector of the curve and the surface normal vector of the membrane.

== Elasticity of cell membranes ==
A cell membrane is simplified as lipid bilayer plus membrane skeleton. The skeleton is a cross-linking protein network and joints to the bilayer at some points. Assume that each proteins in the membrane skeleton have similar length which is much smaller than the whole size of the cell membrane, and that the membrane is locally 2-dimensional uniform and homogenous. Thus the free energy density can be expressed as the invariant form of $2H$, $K$, $\mathrm{tr}(\varepsilon)$ and $\det(\varepsilon)$:

$f_{cm}=f(2H,K,\mathrm{tr}(\varepsilon),\det(\varepsilon))$

10

where $\varepsilon$ is the in-plane strain of the membrane skeleton. Under the assumption of small deformations, and invariant between $\mathrm{tr}\varepsilon$ and $-\mathrm{tr}\varepsilon$, (10) can be expanded up to second order terms as:

$f_{cm}=\frac{k_c}{2}(2H+c_0)^2+\bar{k}K+\lambda+\frac{k_d}{2}(\mathrm{tr}\varepsilon)^2-2\mu (\det\varepsilon)$

11

where $k_d$ and $\mu$ are two elastic constants. In fact, the first two terms in (11) are the bending energy of the cell membrane which contributes mainly from the lipid bilayer. The last two terms come from the entropic elasticity of the membrane skeleton.

== Bibliography ==
=== Reviews on configurations of lipid vesicles ===
[1] R. Lipowsky, The Conformation of Membranes, Nature 349 (1991) 475-481.

[2] U. Seifert, Configurations of Fluid Membranes and Vesicles, Adv. Phys. 46 (1997) 13-137.

[3] Z. C. Ou-Yang, J. X. Liu and Y. Z. Xie, Geometric Methods in the Elastic Theory of Membranes in Liquid Crystal Phases (World Scientific, Singapore, 1999).

[4] A. Biria, M. Maleki and E. Fried, (2013). Continuum theory for the edge of an open lipid bilayer, Advances in Applied Mechanics 46 (2013) 1-68.

=== Research papers on closed vesicles ===
[1] W. Helfrich, Elastic Properties of Lipid Bilayers—Theory and Possible Experiments, Z. Naturforsch. C 28 (1973) 693-703.

[2] O.-Y. Zhong-Can and W. Helfrich, Instability and Deformation of a Spherical Vesicle by Pressure, Phys. Rev. Lett. 59 (1987) 2486-2488.

[3] O.-Y. Zhong-Can, Anchor Ring-Vesicle Membranes, Phys. Rev. A 41 (1990) 4517-4520.

[4] H. Naito, M. Okuda, and O.-Y. Zhong-Can, Counterexample to Some Shape Equations for Axisymmetric Vesicles, Phys. Rev. E 48 (1993) 2304-2307.

[5] U. Seifert, Vesicles of toroidal topology, Phys. Rev. Lett. 66 (1991) 2404-2407.

[6] U. Seifert, K. Berndl, and R. Lipowsky, Shape transformations of vesicles: Phase diagram for spontaneous- curvature and bilayer-coupling models, Phys. Rev. A 44 (1991) 1182-1202.

[7] L. Miao, et al., Budding transitions of fluid-bilayer vesicles: The effect of area-difference elasticity, Phys. Rev. E 49 (1994) 5389-5407.

=== Research papers on open membranes ===
[1] A. Saitoh, K. Takiguchi, Y. Tanaka, and H. Hotani, Opening-up of liposomal membranes by talin, Proc. Natl. Acad. Sci. 95 (1998) 1026-1031.

[2] R. Capovilla, J. Guven, and J.A. Santiago, Lipid membranes with an edge, Phys. Rev. E 66 (2002) 021607.

[3] R. Capovilla and J. Guven, Stresses in lipid membranes, J. Phys. A 35 (2002) 6233-6247.

[4] Z. C. Tu and Z. C. Ou-Yang, Lipid membranes with free edges, Phys. Rev. E 68, (2003) 061915.

[5] T. Umeda, Y. Suezaki, K. Takiguchi, and H. Hotani, Theoretical analysis of opening-up vesicles with single and two holes, Phys. Rev. E 71 (2005) 011913.

[6] A. Biria, M. Maleki and E. Fried, (2013). Continuum theory for the edge of an open lipid bilayer, Advances in Applied Mechanics 46 (2013) 1-68.

=== Numerical solutions on lipid membranes ===
[1] J. Yan, Q. H. Liu, J. X. Liu and Z. C. Ou-Yang, Numerical observation of nonaxisymmetric vesicles in fluid membranes, Phys. Rev. E 58 (1998) 4730-4736.

[2] J. J. Zhou, Y. Zhang, X. Zhou, Z. C. Ou-Yang, Large Deformation of Spherical Vesicle Studied by Perturbation Theory and Surface Evolver, Int J Mod Phys B 15 (2001) 2977-2991.

[3] Y. Zhang, X. Zhou, J. J. Zhou and Z. C. Ou-Yang, Triconcave Solution to the Helfrich Variation Problem for the Shape of Lipid Bilayer Vesicles is Found by Surface Evolver, In. J. Mod. Phys. B 16 (2002) 511-517.

[4] Q. Du, C. Liu and X. Wang, Simulating the deformation of vesicle membranes under elastic bending energy in three dimensions, J. Comput. Phys. 212 (2006) 757.

[5] X. Wang and Q. Du, physics/0605095.

=== Selected papers on cell membranes ===
[1] Y. C. Fung and P. Tong, Theory of the Sphering of Red Blood Cells, Biophys. J. 8 (1968) 175-198.

[2] S. K. Boey, D. H. Boal, and D. E. Discher, Simulations of the Erythrocyte Cytoskeleton at Large Deformation. I. Microscopic Models, Biophys. J. 75 (1998) 1573-1583.

[3] D. E. Discher, D. H. Boal, and S. K. Boey, Simulations of the Erythrocyte Cytoskeleton at Large Deformation. II. Micropipette Aspiration, Biophys. J. 75 (1998) 1584-1597.

[4] E. Sackmann, A.R. Bausch and L. Vonna, Physics of Composite Cell Membrane and Actin Based Cytoskeleton, in Physics of bio-molecules and cells, Edited by H. Flyvbjerg, F. Julicher, P. Ormos And F. David (Springer, Berlin, 2002).

[5] G. Lim, M. Wortis, and R. Mukhopadhyay, Stomatocyte–discocyte–echinocyte sequence of the human red blood cell: Evidence for the bilayer–couple hypothesis from membrane mechanics, Proc. Natl. Acad. Sci. 99 (2002) 16766-16769.

[6] Z. C. Tu and Z. C. Ou-Yang, A Geometric Theory on the Elasticity of Bio-membranes, J. Phys. A: Math. Gen. 37 (2004) 11407-11429.

[7] Z. C. Tu and Z. C. Ou-Yang, Elastic theory of low-dimensional continua and its applications in bio- and nano-structures,arxiv:0706.0001.
