= Douglas Warrick =

Douglas Warrick is a professor in biophysics at the zoology department of Oregon State University, specializing in the study of functional/ecological morphology, aerodynamics, and the evolution of vertebrate flight, working with many bird species, including hummingbirds and seabirds.

== Career ==
Born in Nebraska, Warrick worked for a biological consulting firm from 1987 to 1992, including work on the Exxon Valdez oil spill. Today he continues to participate in studies of seabird mortality from oil spills. From 1999 to 2001 he was an assistant professor in biology at Minot State University in North Dakota. Since 2004 he has been at Oregon State University where his primary focus has been on hummingbirds and swifts.

== Hovering hummingbirds ==
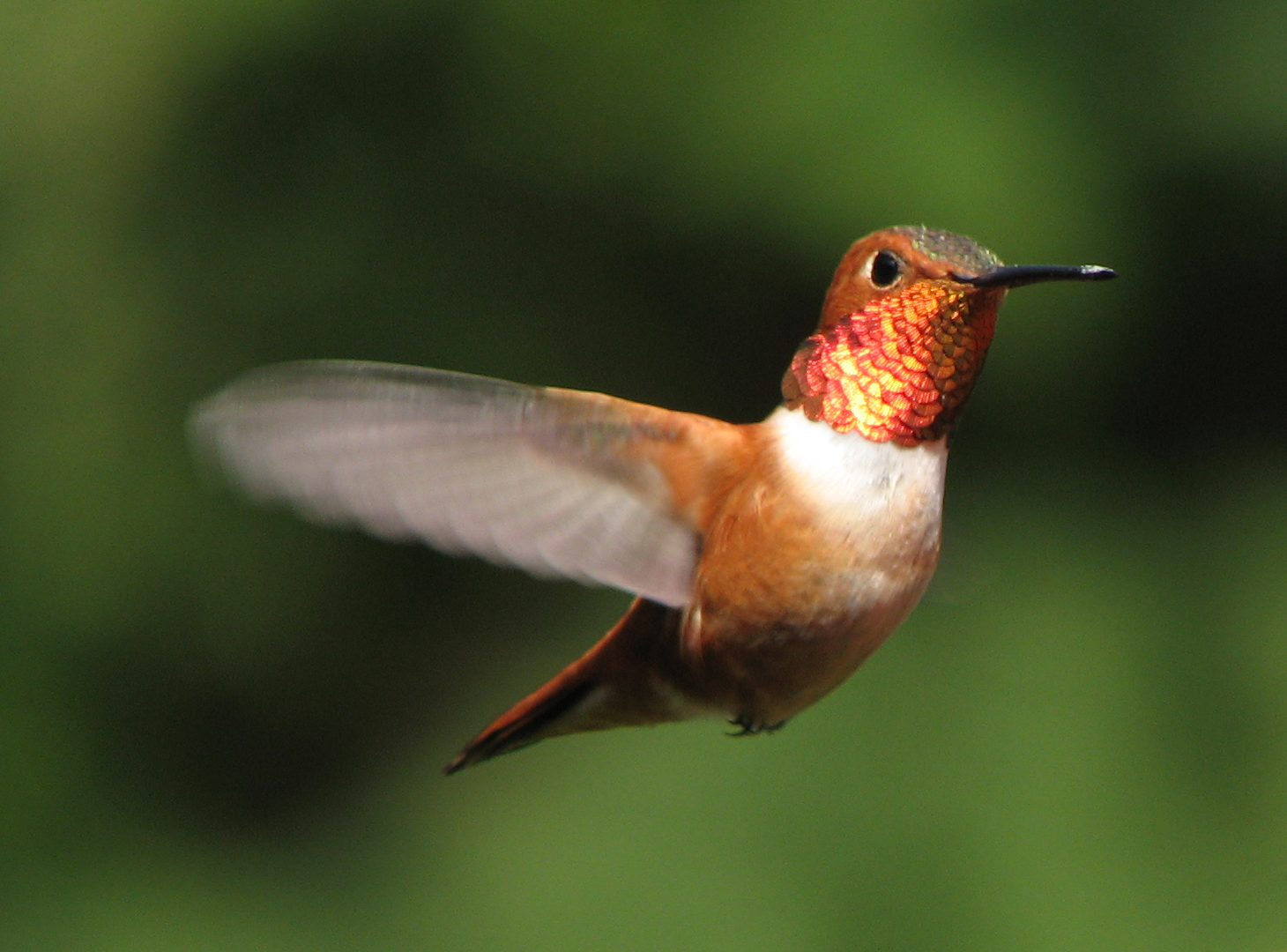
A hovering rufous hummingbird

In 2005, Warrick led a research study into the hummingbird's ability to hover in flight. Working with trained rufous hummingbirds (Selasphorus rufus) that hovered over a feeding syringe filled with sugar solution, Warrick and his research team employed digital particle imaging velocimetry to capture the bird's wing movements on film, which enabled the discovery that the hummingbird's hovering is achieved primarily because of its wing's downstroke (which accounts for 75% of its lift) rather than its upstroke (which makes up the additional 25% of the lift). This was counter to the conventional wisdom which was that the lift was provided 50:50 by the up and down strokes as with hawk moths. Warrick's research was published in Nature, a leading scientific journal, and his research conclusions were widely reported in the international media such as Scientific American, the BBC, the Associated Press news wire, and the United States National Science Foundation.

== Inspiration for art ==
Warrick et al.'s Nature (2005) article inspired Jennifer MacMillan and Bradley Eros to create their own "experiment" - investigating the "cross-pollination of scientific visualization and poetic document". Their art work added "star studies, satellite recordings, subaquatic and botanical investigations, liquid crystals, visual music performance generated from the scientific instrument, high speed motion studies, a discussion of subatomic physics, and readings of the 10 most beautiful experiments of science."

== Selected publications ==
- Douglas R. Warrick, Bret W. Tobalske, Donald R. Powers (2009) Lift production in the hovering hummingbird, Proceedings of the Royal Society B: Biological Sciences, Vol. 276, No. 1674. (7 November), pp. 3747–3752.
- Bret W. Tobalske, Jason W. D. Hearn and Douglas R. Warrick (2009) Aerodynamics of intermittent bounds in flying birds, Experiments in Fluids Volume 46, Number 5 / May, 2009
- Douglas R. Warrick, Bret W. Tobalske & Donald R. Powers (2005) Aerodynamics of the hovering hummingbird, Nature 435, 1094-1097 23 June
- K. P. Dial, A. A. Biewener, B. W. Tobalske & D. R. Warrick (1997) Mechanical power output of bird flight, Nature 390, 67-70 6 November
