= David States =

American biophysicist

- Education: Harvard University (B.A. 1975, M.D. 1983, Ph.D. 1983)
- Known for: Computational methods to understand the human genome
- Scientific career
- Fields: Human genetics
- Institutions: UMich, MIT, UC San Diego, WUSTL

David J. States is an American biophysicist who is professor of human genetics at the University of Michigan. His research group is using computational methods to understand the human genome and how it relates to the human proteome. He is the director of the Michigan NIH Bioinformatics Training Program and a senior scientist in the National Center for Integrative Biomedical Informatics.

== Early life and education ==
States earned his B.A. ('75), M.D. ('83) and Ph.D. ('83) degrees at Harvard University.

== Career ==
He was a staff scientist at the National Magnet Laboratory at MIT and a resident in internal medicine at UCSD Medical Center. He then moved to the NIH as a clinical associate and senior staff fellow, where he joined the National Center for Biotechnology Information (NCBI). While at NCBI, he and Warren Gish enhanced BLAST, one of the most widely used programs in bioinformatics [4]. In 1992, States was recruited to Washington University as director of the Institute for Biomedical Computing, and in 2001, he moved to the University of Michigan to establish the University of Michigan Bioinformatics Program. He was a member of the founding board of directors and treasurer of the International Society for Computational Biology and Chair of the 2005 Intelligent Systems for Molecular Biology Conferences.

States is also known for his work in nuclear magnetic resonance where he developed pure absorption phase multi-dimensional spectroscopy, a technique now widely used in protein structure determination. States also contributed to computational biophysics as an author of the CHARMM molecular dynamics simulation program. He combined NMR spectroscopy and modeling to demonstrate for the first time the presence of native-like structure in the folding intermediates of bovine pancreatic trypsin inhibitor[1-2] and the first demonstration of a conformationally trapped folding intermediate [3].

== Publications ==
- States, DJ; Creighton, TE; Dobson, CM; Karplus, M (June 1987). "Conformations of intermediates in the folding of the pancreatic trypsin inhibitor". J. Mol. Biol. 195: 731–9. PMID 2443711.
- States, DJ; Dobson, CM; Karplus, M (April 1984). "A new two-disulphide intermediate in the refolding of reduced bovine pancreatic trypsin inhibitor". J. Mol. Biol. 174: 411–8. PMID 6201619.
- States, DJ; Dobson, CM; Karplus, M; Creighton, TE (August 1980). "A conformational isomer of bovine pancreatic trypsin inhibitor protein produced by refolding". Nature. 286: 630–2. PMID 7402343.
- Gish, W; States, DJ (March 1993). "Identification of protein coding regions by database similarity search". Nat. Genet. 3: 266–72. doi:10.1038/ng0393-266. PMID 8485583.
