= Zinovii Shulman =

Belarusian hydrodynamics scientist (1924–2007)

Zinovii P. Shulman (23 February 1924 – 4 February 2007) was a Belarusian hydrodynamics scientist, former chief research worker of the state research institute A. V. Luikov Heat and Mass Transfer Institute of the National Academy of Sciences of Belarus, and a doctor of technical sciences.

== Early life and education ==
Born in Ptich, Shulman spent his childhood in a small township near the Ptich railway station in Gomel Province. Later, his family moved to Gomel, where he attended high school in preparation for tertiary studies.

When World War II broke out, like several of his fellow male students, Shulman joined to defend his country. His courage and valour were marked with high battle service decorations, including the Order of Glory and Order of the Patriotic War.

In 1947, after his military discharge and without passing high-school equivalency exams, Shulman matriculated to the Leningrad Polytechnical Institute, where he was taught by the physicist Abram Ioffe.

== Career ==
As an engineer in aerohydrodynamics, Shulman worked on an assignment at a major industrial design office in the city of Syzran where he worked to create new equipment products. While working as part of a large team, Shulman took an active part in scientific innovation. He organized several scientific cells at the plant, published his first research paper in the journal Energomachinostroyeniye and made inventions. One of his early proposals was of quite fundamental nature: a split wheel for a water turbine. In 1957, Shulman returned to his native Belarus, where he was employed by the Institute of Power Engineering of the BSSR Academy of Sciences. There he continued his scientific development, acquiring, accumulating and, what is more important, creating new knowledge.

In 1963, a new scientific school investigation of the flow and heat and mass transfer in rheologically complex media began to develop at the Heat and Mass Transfer Institute (HMTI)] on the initiative of academician A. V. Luikov, member of the BSSR Academy of Sciences, and Shulman. As early as 1966 the pioneering monograph Boundary layer of Non-Newtonian Fluids by Shulman and Berkovsky was published. In it, the authors generalized their own theoretical developments and descriptions of convective processes of heat and momentum transfer in external flow of nonlinear-viscous fluids past bodies of various geometry. Subsequent results of the new theoretical and experimental investigations were reflected in Shulman's work Convective Heat and Mass Transfer of Rheologically Complex Fluids (Moscow: Energia, 1975) and in a large series of publications for the Rheophysics Laboratory in authoritative domestic and foreign publications. The monograph gave an explanation of the phenomenon discovered by Luikov, Shulman and Puris. During the same years, Puris and Shulman discovered rubber mechanical behavior of gases in high-intensity rotating flows with considerable rates of shear deformations in the interdisk gap with eccentricity.

The generalized law of nonlinear-viscous flow (1966) formulated by Shulman and his followers is widely used in the scientific world. Based on this law, six monographs have been written and various investigations have been actively conducted.

A fundamental study of the electric rheological effect (ERE) was started in 1966 and that of the magnetic rheological effect (MRE) began the following year. The results led to new theories and also to more than 170 engineering applications: among them robots, manipulators, machine-tools, electro-acoustic equipment and micromachines. A large series of investigations on the said subject is reflected in articles, papers and monographs written personally or in co-authorship.

In the years before his death, Shulman worked a lot and achieved success in the field of biomedical problems and, in particular, the rheology of blood. This included the description and modeling of thermal processes in controlled hyperthermia and hypothermia and also in photodynamic therapy.

He died on 4 February 2007 in Minsk, Belarus.

== Honours ==
Honored worker of science of the Republic of Belarus, Shulman is considered a pioneer in ERE and MRE. In 1982, based on the results of the all-union contest, he was mentioned among the five best inventors of the USSR. In 1997 he was awarded the annual G. V. Vinogradov Prize of the Rheological Society of the C.I.S. He was honored as a scientist and awarded decorations by foreign universities (Sheffield, Warsaw, Seoul, and Kraków). Twenty-nine doctoral dissertations and those of 108 candidates have been prepared under his supervision.
