= CHRNA9 =

Protein-coding gene in humans

Identifiers
- Aliases: CHRNA9, HSA243342, NACHRA9, cholinergic receptor nicotinic alpha 9 subunit
- External IDs: OMIM: 605116; MGI: 1202403; GeneCards: CHRNA9
Available structures
PDB	Human UniProt search: PDBe RCSB
PDB	List of PDB id codes 4D01, 4UXU, 4UY2

Gene location (Human)
Chr.	Chromosome 4 (human)
Band	4p14	Start	40,335,333 bp
Band	4p14	End	40,355,217 bp

Gene location (Mouse)
Chr.	Chromosome 5 (mouse)
Band	5 C3.1|5 33.84 cM	Start	66,092,264 bp
Band	5 C3.1|5 33.84 cM	End	66,134,669 bp
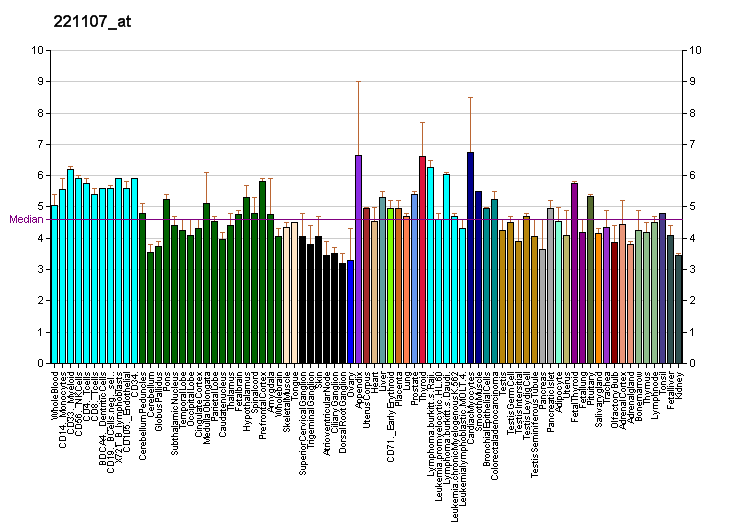
RNA expression pattern
Bgee	Human / Mouse (ortholog); Top expressed in: testicle; gonad; human penis; olfactory zone of nasal mucosa; right uterine tube; tibialis anterior muscle; bronchial epithelial cell; vulva; skin of limb; skin of leg / Top expressed in: otolith organ; utricle; thymus; esophagus; morula; vestibular sensory epithelium; embryo; blastocyst; spermatid; temporal muscle; More reference expression data
BioGPS	More reference expression data
Gene ontology
Molecular function	ion channel activity; calcium channel activity; extracellular ligand-gated ion channel activity; ligand-gated ion channel activity; acetylcholine-gated cation-selective channel activity; protein binding; transmembrane signaling receptor activity; transmitter-gated ion channel activity involved in regulation of postsynaptic membrane potential
Cellular component	synapse; integral component of membrane; cell junction; integral component of plasma membrane; postsynaptic membrane; membrane; acetylcholine-gated channel complex; plasma membrane; cholinergic synapse; integral component of postsynaptic specialization membrane; neuron projection
Biological process	calcium ion transport; detection of mechanical stimulus involved in sensory perception of sound; positive regulation of cytosolic calcium ion concentration; inner ear morphogenesis; hearing; ion transport; calcium ion transmembrane transport; cation transport; regulation of postsynaptic membrane potential; excitatory postsynaptic potential; signal transduction; ion transmembrane transport; negative regulation of ERK1 and ERK2 cascade; chemical synaptic transmission; regulation of membrane potential; nervous system process
Sources:Amigo / QuickGO
Orthologs
Databases	NCBI: entry; OMA: entry
Species	Human	Mouse
Entrez	55584	231252
Ensembl	ENSG00000174343	ENSMUSG00000029205
UniProt	Q9UGM1	n/a
RefSeq (mRNA)	NM_017581	NM_001081104
RefSeq (protein)	NP_060051	n/a
Location (UCSC)	Chr 4: 40.34 – 40.36 Mb	Chr 5: 66.09 – 66.13 Mb
PubMed search
- Wikidata
View/Edit Human	View/Edit Mouse

Neuronal acetylcholine receptor subunit alpha-9, also known as nAChRα9, is a protein that in humans is encoded by the CHRNA9 gene. The protein encoded by this gene is a subunit of certain nicotinic acetylcholine receptors (nAchR).

α9 subunit-containing receptors are notably blocked by nicotine. The role of this antagonism in the effects of tobacco are unknown.

This gene is a member of the ligand-gated ionic channel family and nicotinic acetylcholine receptor gene superfamily. It encodes a plasma membrane protein that forms homo- or hetero-oligomeric divalent cation channels. This protein is involved in cochlea hair cell function and is expressed in both the inner and outer hair cells (OHCs) of the adult cochlea, although expression levels in adult inner hair cells is low. The activation of the alpha9/10 nAChR is via olivocochlear activity, represented by cholinergic efferent synaptic terminals originating from the superior olive region of the brainstem. The protein is additionally expressed in keratinocytes, the pituitary gland, B-cells and T-cells.

Selective block of α9α10 nicotinic acetylcholine receptors by the conotoxin RgIA has been shown to be analgesic in an animal model of nerve injury pain.

== See also ==
- Nicotinic acetylcholine receptor
