= CHRNB1 =

Protein-coding gene in humans

Identifiers
- Aliases: CHRNB1, ACHRB, CHRNB, CMS1D, CMS2A, SCCMS, CMS2C, cholinergic receptor nicotinic beta 1 subunit
- External IDs: OMIM: 100710; MGI: 87890; GeneCards: CHRNB1

Gene location (Human)
Chr.	Chromosome 17 (human)
Band	17p13.1	Start	7,445,061 bp
Band	17p13.1	End	7,457,710 bp

Gene location (Mouse)
Chr.	Chromosome 11 (mouse)
Band	11 B3|11 42.87 cM	Start	69,674,862 bp
Band	11 B3|11 42.87 cM	End	69,686,769 bp
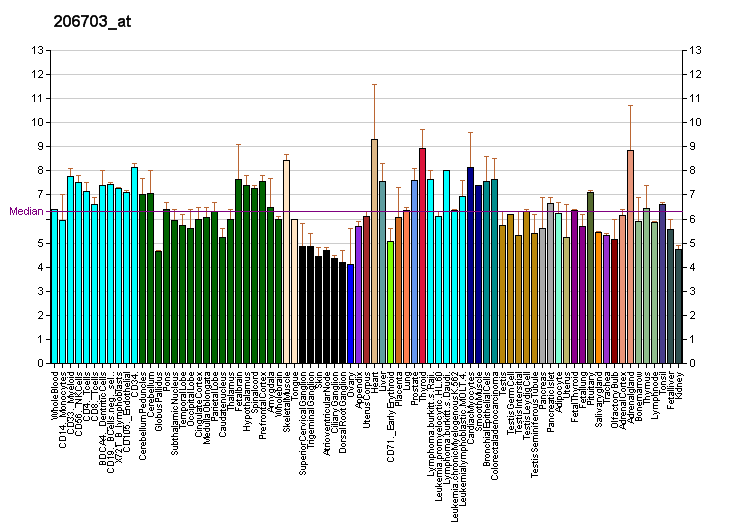
RNA expression pattern
Bgee	Human / Mouse (ortholog); Top expressed in: gastrocnemius muscle; muscle of thigh; skeletal muscle tissue; right adrenal cortex; left adrenal gland; left adrenal cortex; placenta; right lobe of liver; amygdala; granulocyte / Top expressed in: muscle of thigh; extraocular muscle; ankle; ankle joint; vastus lateralis muscle; temporal muscle; thoracic diaphragm; tongue muscle; medial head of gastrocnemius muscle; tibialis anterior muscle; More reference expression data
BioGPS	More reference expression data
Gene ontology
Molecular function	channel activity; acetylcholine binding; acetylcholine receptor activity; ion channel activity; ligand-gated ion channel activity; extracellular ligand-gated ion channel activity; acetylcholine-gated cation-selective channel activity; transmembrane signaling receptor activity; transmitter-gated ion channel activity involved in regulation of postsynaptic membrane potential
Cellular component	integral component of membrane; acetylcholine-gated channel complex; postsynaptic membrane; membrane; plasma membrane; synapse; integral component of plasma membrane; cell junction; neuromuscular junction; integral component of postsynaptic specialization membrane; neuron projection
Biological process	muscle contraction; regulation of membrane potential; skeletal muscle contraction; cation transport; nervous system process; synaptic transmission, cholinergic; ion transport; behavioral response to nicotine; neuromuscular synaptic transmission; postsynaptic membrane organization; signal transduction; cation transmembrane transport; regulation of postsynaptic membrane potential; excitatory postsynaptic potential; ion transmembrane transport; chemical synaptic transmission; response to nicotine
Sources:Amigo / QuickGO
Orthologs
Databases	NCBI: entry; OMA: entry
Species	Human	Mouse
Entrez	1140	11443
Ensembl	ENSG00000170175; ENSG00000283946	ENSMUSG00000041189
UniProt	P11230	P09690
RefSeq (mRNA)	NM_000747	NM_009601
RefSeq (protein)	NP_000738	NP_033731
Location (UCSC)	Chr 17: 7.45 – 7.46 Mb	Chr 11: 69.67 – 69.69 Mb
PubMed search
- Wikidata
View/Edit Human	View/Edit Mouse

Acetylcholine receptor subunit beta is a protein that in humans is encoded by the CHRNB1 gene.

The muscle acetylcholine receptor is composed of five subunits: two alpha subunits and one beta, one gamma, and one delta subunit. This gene encodes the beta subunit of the acetylcholine receptor. The acetylcholine receptor changes conformation upon acetylcholine binding leading to the opening of an ion-conducting channel across the plasma membrane. Mutations in this gene are associated with slow-channel congenital myasthenic syndrome.

== See also ==
- Nicotinic acetylcholine receptor
