= CLNS1B =

Protein-coding gene in humans

CLNS1AP1

Identifiers
- Aliases: CLNS1AP1, CLNS1B, ICln, chloride nucleotide-sensitive channel 1A pseudogene 1
- External IDs: GeneCards: CLNS1AP1

Gene location (Human)
| Chr. | Chromosome 6 (human) |
| Band | 6p12.1 | Start | 54,485,169 bp |
| Band | 6p12.1 | End | 54,485,850 bp |
RNA expression pattern
| Bgee | Human / Mouse (ortholog); Top expressed in: ventricular zone; skeletal muscle tissue; muscle of leg; gastrocnemius muscle / n/a; More reference expression data |
| BioGPS | n/a |
Orthologs
| Databases | NCBI: entry; OMA: entry |
| Species | Human | Mouse |
| Entrez | 1204 | n/a |
| Ensembl | ENSG00000213335 | n/a |
| UniProt | n a | n/a |
| RefSeq (mRNA) | n/a | n/a |
| RefSeq (protein) | n/a | n/a |
| Location (UCSC) | Chr 6: 54.49 – 54.49 Mb | n/a |
| PubMed search | | n/a |
- Wikidata
| View/Edit Human |

Chloride channel, nucleotide-sensitive, 1A, also known as CLNS1A, is a human gene. The protein encoded by this gene is a chloride channel regulator.
