= Crisco (surname) =

Crisco is a surname. Notable people with the surname include:

- Joseph Crisco, American engineer
- Joseph Crisco Jr. (1934–2025), American politician
- Keith Crisco (1943–2014), American businessman and public official
