= CHRNA2 =

Protein-coding gene in humans

Identifiers
- Aliases: CHRNA2, cholinergic receptor nicotinic alpha 2 subunit
- External IDs: OMIM: 118502; MGI: 87886; GeneCards: CHRNA2

Gene location (Human)
Chr.	Chromosome 8 (human)
Band	8p21.2	Start	27,459,756 bp
Band	8p21.2	End	27,479,883 bp

Gene location (Mouse)
Chr.	Chromosome 14 (mouse)
Band	14 D1|14 34.36 cM	Start	66,372,488 bp
Band	14 D1|14 34.36 cM	End	66,390,397 bp
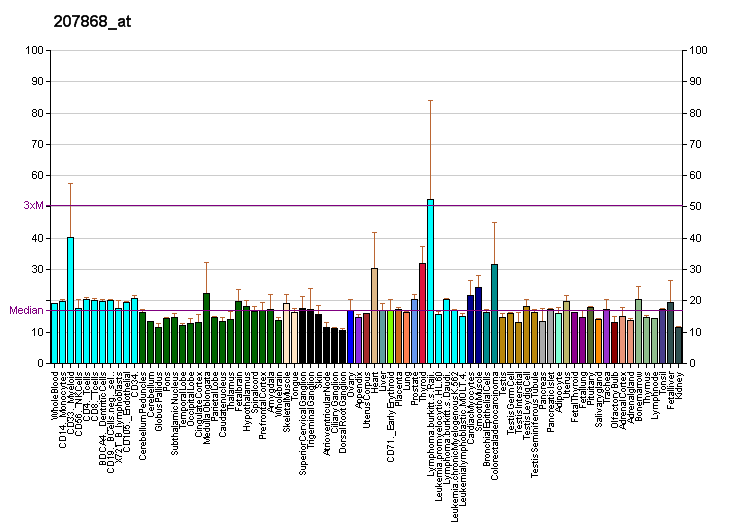
RNA expression pattern
Bgee	Human / Mouse (ortholog); Top expressed in: gonad; lateral nuclear group of thalamus; secondary oocyte; prostate; prefrontal cortex; inferior ganglion of vagus nerve; right frontal lobe; periodontal fiber; renal medulla; bone / Top expressed in: neural layer of retina; granulocyte; muscle of thigh; proximal tubule; superior frontal gyrus; dentate gyrus of hippocampal formation granule cell; thoracic diaphragm; cerebellar cortex; primary visual cortex; lobe of prostate; More reference expression data
BioGPS	More reference expression data
Gene ontology
Molecular function	acetylcholine binding; acetylcholine receptor activity; ion channel activity; extracellular ligand-gated ion channel activity; ligand-gated ion channel activity; acetylcholine-gated cation-selective channel activity; transmembrane signaling receptor activity
Cellular component	integral component of membrane; acetylcholine-gated channel complex; postsynaptic membrane; membrane; plasma membrane; synapse; cell junction; cell periphery; integral component of plasma membrane; neuron projection
Biological process	protein heterooligomerization; response to nicotine; synaptic transmission, cholinergic; ion transport; neuromuscular synaptic transmission; signal transduction; regulation of postsynaptic membrane potential; excitatory postsynaptic potential; ion transmembrane transport; chemical synaptic transmission; regulation of membrane potential; nervous system process; transmembrane transport
Sources:Amigo / QuickGO
Orthologs
Databases	NCBI: entry; OMA: entry
Species	Human	Mouse
Entrez	1135	110902
Ensembl	ENSG00000120903	ENSMUSG00000022041
UniProt	Q15822	Q91X60
RefSeq (mRNA)	NM_000742; NM_001282455; NM_001347705; NM_001347706; NM_001347707 NM_001347708	NM_144803
RefSeq (protein)	NP_000733; NP_001269384; NP_001334634; NP_001334635; NP_001334636 NP_001334637	NP_659052
Location (UCSC)	Chr 8: 27.46 – 27.48 Mb	Chr 14: 66.37 – 66.39 Mb
PubMed search
- Wikidata
View/Edit Human	View/Edit Mouse

Neuronal acetylcholine receptor subunit alpha-2, also known as nAChRα2, is a protein that in humans is encoded by the CHRNA2 gene. The protein encoded by this gene is a subunit of certain nicotinic acetylcholine receptors (nAchR).

== Function ==
Knockout of this gene in mice potentiates nicotine-modulated behaviors. Using two different genetically modified mutant mouse lines (Chrna2L9'S/L9'S and Chrna2KO), findings highlight that α2* nAChRs influence hippocampus-dependent learning and memory and CA1 synaptic plasticity in adolescent mice.

== See also ==
- Nicotinic acetylcholine receptor
