= Synthetic ion channels =

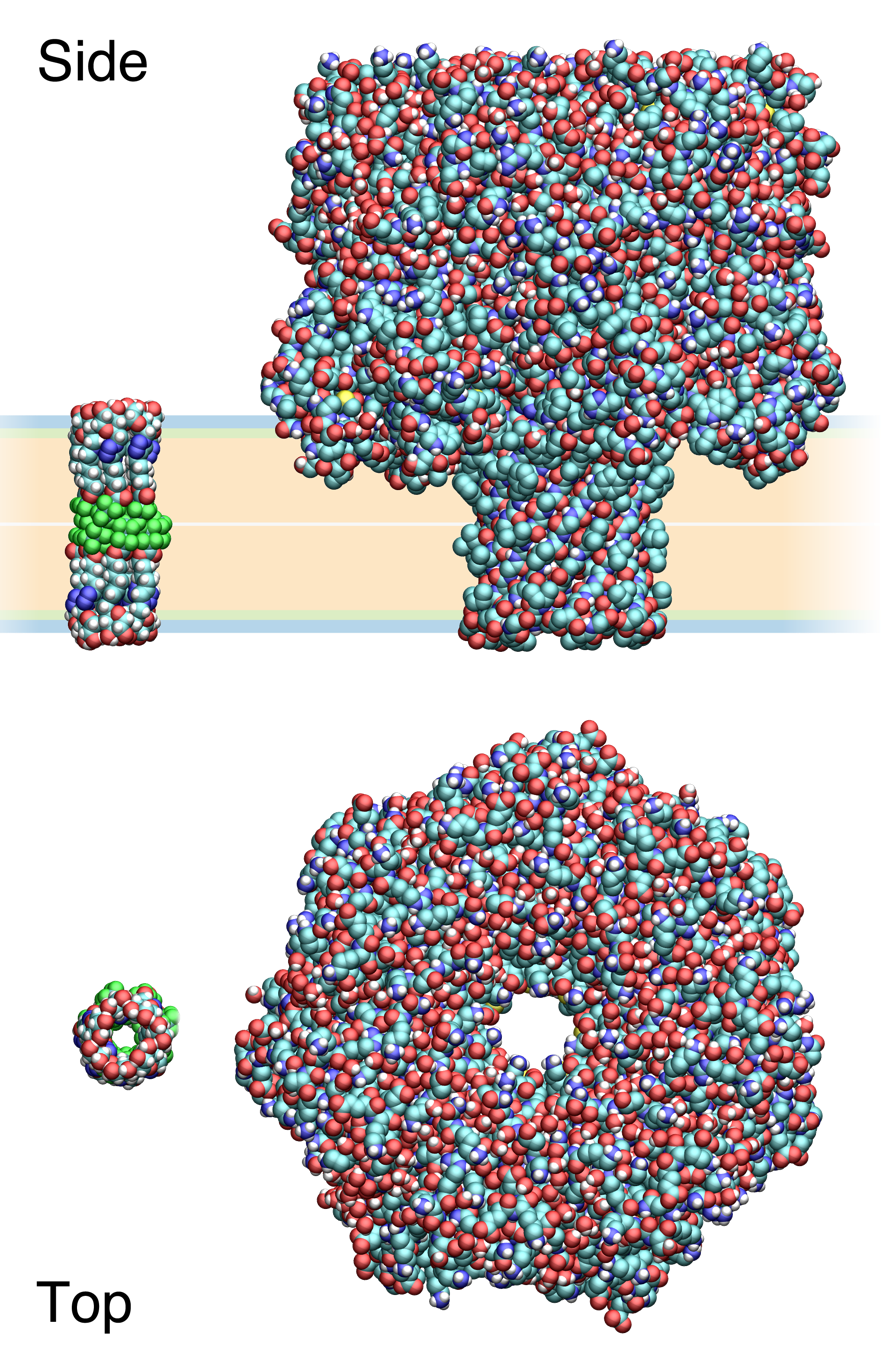
Size comparison of the postulated dimer of cyclodextrin half-channels (synthetic ion channel, left), and hemolysin (a natural pore, right)

Synthetic ion channels are de novo chemical compounds that insert into lipid bilayers, form pores, and allow ions to flow from one side to the other. They are man-made analogues of natural ion channels, and are thus also known as artificial ion channels. Compared to biological channels, they usually allow fluxes of similar magnitude but are

1. minuscule in size (less than 5k Dalton vs. > 100k Dalton),
2. diverse in molecular architecture, and
3. may rely on diverse supramolecular interactions to pre-form the active, conducting structures.

Synthetic channels, like natural channels, are usually characterized by a combination of single-molecule (e.g., voltage-clamp of planar bilayers) and ensemble techniques (flux in vesicles). The study of synthetic ion channels can potentially lead to new single-molecule sensing technologies as well as new therapeutics.

== History ==
Chemical structure and expected channel forming mechanism for the first attempt at preparing a synthetic ion channel

While semi-synthetic ion channels, often based on modified peptidic channels like gramicidin, had been prepared since the 1970s, the first attempt to prepare a synthetic ion channel was made in 1982 using a substituted β-cyclodextrin.

Inspired by gramicidin, this molecule was designed to be a barrel-shaped entity spanning a single leaflet of a bilayer membrane, becoming "active" only when two molecules in opposite leaflets come together in an end-to-end fashion. While the compound does induce ion-fluxes in vesicles, the data does not unambiguously show channel formation (as opposed to other transport mechanisms; see Mechanism).

Na^{+} transport by such channels was first reported by two groups of investigators in 1989–1990.

With the adoption of voltage clamp technique to synthetic channel research in the early 1990s, researchers were able to observe quantized electrical activities from synthetic molecules, often considered the signature evidence for ion channels. This led to a sustained increase in research activity over the next two decades. In 2009, over 25 peer-reviewed papers were published on the topic, and a series of comprehensive reviews are available.

== Characterization and mechanisms ==
Mechanisms of transport: (L) channel, (M) ionophore/carrier, and (R) detergent

Passive transport of ions across a membrane can take place by three main mechanisms: by ferrying, through defects in a disrupted membrane, or through a defined trajectory; these corresponds to ionophore, detergent, and ion channel transporters. While synthetic ion channel research attempts to prepare compounds that show conductance via a defined path, the elucidation of mechanism is difficult and seldom unambiguous. The two main methods of characterization both have their drawbacks, and as a consequence, often function is defined but mechanism presumed.

=== Ensemble, vesicle-based time course ===
Vesicle-based assay for ion channels. Ion transporter induces an all-or-none change at the level of the individual vesicle, culminating in a macroscopic time-course that is dependent on transporter activity and concentration.

One line of evidence for ion transport comes from macroscopic examination of statistical ensembles. All these techniques use intact vesicles with an entrapped volume, with ion channel activities reported by different spectroscopic methods.

In a typical case, a dye is entrapped within the population of vesicles. This dye is selected to be respond colorimetrically or fluorometrically to the presence of an ion; this ion is typically absent from the inside of the vesicle but present in the outside. Without an ion transporter, the lipid bilayer as a kinetic barrier to block ion flux, and the dye remains "dark" indefinitely.

As an ion transporter allows ions on the outside to diffuse in, its addition will affect the color/fluorescence property of the dye. By macroscopically monitoring the dye's properties over time, and controlling outside factors, the ability of a compound to act as an ion transporter can be measured.

Observing ion transport, however, does not pin down ion channel as the mechanism. Any class of transporter can lead to the same observation, and additional corroborating evidence is usually required. Sophisticated experiments intended to probe selectivity, gating, and other channel parameters have been developed over the past two decades and recently summarized.

==== Vesicle assay variations ====
Method	Reporter	Example
NMR	sodium-23 line width	Hydraphiles
Fluorescent	HPTS ex/em ratios	Oligoesters
pH-stat	H^{+}	Crown ether-barrels
Ion-selective electrodes	Cl^{−}	"SCMTR"

=== Stochastic, planar bilayer-based current traces ===
Voltage-clamp experiment on planar bilayers. (A) In the absence of an ion channel, the bilayer is a resistor that has no current flow even when a potential is applied. (B) In the presence of a single, ideal ion channel molecule, a uniform step-up (whose height corresponds to the dimensions of the pore) appears. (C) Different classes of transport mechanism in theory gives rise to different profile.

An alternative to the ensemble-based method described above is the voltage-clamp experiment. In a voltage-clamp experiment, two compartments of electrolyte are divided by an aperture, usually between 5-250 micrometres in diameter. A lipid bilayer is painted across this aperture, thus electrically separating the compartments; the molecular nature can be ascertained by measuring its capacitance.

Upon the addition of an (ideal) ion channel, a defined path between the two compartments is formed. Through this pore, ions flow down the potential and electrochemical gradient rapidly (>10^{6}/second), the maximum flux limited by the geometry and dimensions of the pore. At some later instant the pore may close or collapse, whereupon the current returns to zero. This open-state current, originating and amplified from a single-molecule event, is typically on the order of pA to nA, with time-resolution of approx. millisecond. Ideal or close-to-ideal events is termed "square-tops" in the literature, and have been considered as signature for a channel-based mechanism.

It is notable that the events observed at this scale are truly stochastic - that is, they are the result of random molecular collision and conformation changes. As the membrane area is much larger than that of a pore, multiple copies may open and close independently of one another, giving rise to the staircase like appearance (Panel C in figure); these ideal events are often modelled as Markov processes.

By using the activity grid notation, synthetic ion channels studied with the voltage-clamp method during the period 1982-2010 have been critically reviewed. While the ideal traces are most frequently analyzed and reported in the literature, many records are decidedly non-ideal, with a subset was shown to be fractal. Developing methods for analyzing these non-ideal traces and clarifying their relationship to transport mechanism is an area of contemporary research.

== Examples ==
A diverse and large pool of synthetic molecules have been reported to act as ion transporters in lipid membranes. A selection is described here to demonstrate the breadth of feasible structures and attainable functions. Comprehensive reviews for the literature up to 2010 are available in a tripartite series.

=== By chemical structure ===
Most (but not all; see minimalist channels) synthetic channels have chemical structures substantially larger than typical small molecules (molecular weights ~1-5kDa). This originates from the need to be amphiphilic, that is, have both sufficient hydrophobic portions to allow partitioning into lipid bilayer, as well as polar or charged "headgroups" to assert a defined orientation and geometry with respect to the membrane.

==== Macrocycles-based ====
===== Crown ethers-based =====
Postulated membrane-spanning channel with crown ether in core

Crown ether structure

===== Calixarene-based =====
Ion channels containing calixarenes of ring size 3 and 4 have both been reported. For calix[4]arene, two conformations are accessible, and examples of both 1,3-alt and cone conformation have been developed.

===== Cyclodextrin-based =====
Cyclodextrin "half-channels". Top: postulated "gramicidin-like" mechanism . Bottom: chemical structures of these cyclodextrin-conjugates.

The first synthetic ion channel was constructed by partial substitution on the primary rim of β-cyclodextrin. Other substituted β-cyclodextrins have since been reported, including thiol-modified cyclodextrins, an anion-selective oligobutylene channel, and various poly-ethyleneoxide linked starburst oligomers. Structure-activity relationships for a large suite of cyclodextrin "half-channels" prepared by "click"-chemistry has been recently reported.

==== Peptide-based ====
Peptidic macrocycles

Alternating D/L peptide macrocycles are known to self-aggregate into nanotubes, and the resulting nanotubes have been shown to act as ion channels in lipid membranes.

Other architectures use peptide helices as a scaffold to attach other functionalities, such as crown ethers of different sizes. The property of these peptide-crown channels depend strongly on the identity of the capping end-groups.

==== Hybrid bio-channels ====
Semi-synthetic bio-hybrid channels constructed by modifications of natural ion channels had been constructed. Leveraging modern synthetic organic chemistry, these allows pinpoint modifications of existing structures to either elucidate their transport mechanisms or to graft on new functionalities.

Gramicidin and alamethicin had been popular starting points for selective modifications. The above diagram illustrates one example, where a crown-ether was fixed across the mouth of the ion-passing portal. This channel shows discrete conductance but different ion selectivity than wild type gramicidin in voltage-clamp experiments.

While modification of large protein channels using mutagenesis are generally considered out of the scope of synthetic channels, the demarcation is not sharp, as supramolecular or covalent bonding of cyclodextrins to alpha-hemolysin demonstrates.

=== By transport characteristics ===
An ion channel can be characterized by its opening characteristics, ion selectivity, and control of flux (gating). Many synthetic ion channels show unique properties in one or more of these aspects.

==== Opening characteristics ====
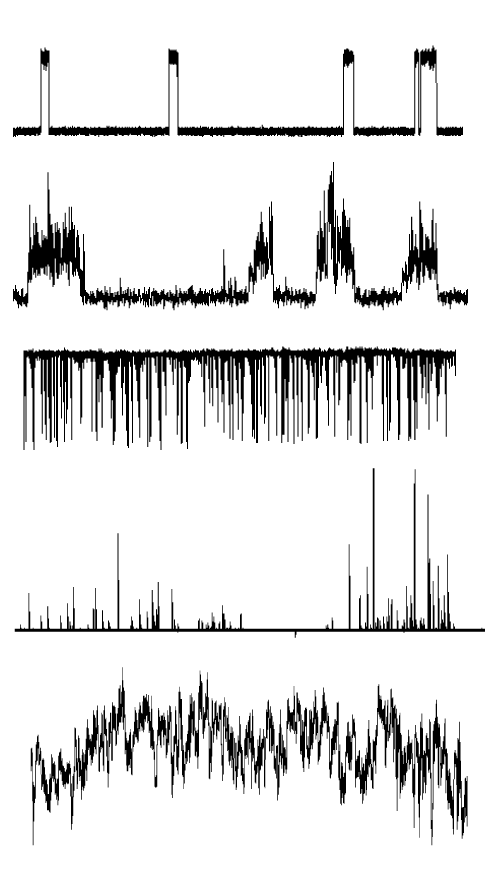
Sample of conductance-time records formed by synthetic ion channels in planar bilayer experiments

An "ion-channel forming" molecule can often show multiple types of conductance activities in planar bilayer membranes. Each of these modes of action can be characterized by their

- open duration (sub-ms---hours), related to whether the active structure is kinetically labile,
- unit conductance (pS---nS), related to the geometry of the active structure, and
- open probability, a fraction related to the thermodynamic stability of that active structure relative to inactive forms.

These events are not necessarily uniform throughout their durations, and as a result a variety of shapes of conducting traces are possible.

==== Ion selectivity ====
The majority of synthetic ion channels follow an Eisenman I sequence (Cs^{+} > Rb^{+} > K^{+} > Na^{+} >> Li^{+}) in their selectivity for alkali metal cations, suggesting that the origin of the selectivity is governed by the difference in energy required to remove water from a fully hydrated cation. A few synthetic channels show other patterns of ion selectivity, and only a single instance in which a synthetic channel following the opposite selectivity sequence (Eisenman XI; Cs^{+} < Rb^{+} < K^{+} < Na^{+} << Li^{+}) had been reported.

==== Gating ====
===== Voltage response =====
Modes of voltage responses in synthetic ion channels. A: linear potential dependence (Ohmic). B: rectifier. C: exponential potential dependence

Most synthetic channels are Ohmic in conductance, that is, the current passed (both individually and as an ensemble) is proportional to the potential across the membrane. Some rare channels, however, show current-voltage characteristics that is non-linear. Specifically, two different types of non-Ohmic conductance are known:

1. a rectifying behaviour, where current passes depends on the sign of the applied potential, and
2. an exponential potential dependence, where the current passed scales exponentially with the applied potential.

The former requires asymmetry with respect to the mid-plane of the lipid bilayer, and is realized often by introducing an overall molecular dipole. The latter, demonstrated in natural channels such as alamethicin, is rarely encountered in synthetic ion channels. They may be related to lipid ion channels, but to date their mechanism remains elusive.

===== Ligand response =====
Certain synthetic ion channels have conductances that can be modulated by additional of external chemicals. Both up-modulation (channels are turned on by ligand) and down-modulation (channels are turned off by ligands)have been reported. The up-modulation is mainly achieved via ligand-induced assembly of supramolecular aggregates,whereas the down-modulation is mediated by intermolecular blockage and intramolecular blockager.

===== Others =====
Regulatory elements that responds to other signals are known; examples include photomodulated conductances as well as "thermal switches" constructed by isomerization of the carbamate group. To date, no mechanosensitive synthetic ion channels have been reported.

== See also ==
- Nanotechnology
- Supramolecular chemistry
- Macrocycles
- Amphiphile
- Ionophore
- Membrane biophysics
- Membrane protein
- Voltage-gated ion channel
- Pore-forming toxin
- Antimicrobial peptides
- Electrophysiology
