= Ecomechanics =

Ecomechanics is a biomechanic scientific discipline studying the mechanisms underlying organisms' interactions with their environment. It incorporates elements of ecology and comparative physiology, as an outgrowth of biomechanics. The term was originally coined by Dr. M. A. R. Koehl. The field gained its own recognition as the result of a working group at Friday Harbor Laboratories in September 2009.
