= Petr Paucek =

American biophysicist

Petr Paucek is a Czech-born biophysicist and biomedical researcher and an associate professor of biology at Portland State University.

== Early life and education ==
Paucek attended the Academy of Science at Prague, where he obtained doctorates in biophysics and physiology, and later trained at the Medical College of Ohio (subsequently renamed The University of Toledo Health Science Campus) and the Oregon Health & Science University. He relocated from Oregon to Maine in 2005 to conduct research at the Thomas M. Teague Biotechnology Center in Fairfield.

== Career ==
He has co-authored a number of frequently-cited articles in Circulation Research, the Journal of Biological Chemistry, and the American Journal of Physiology.
