= Physics of skiing =

The physics of skiing refers to the analysis of the forces acting on a person while skiing.

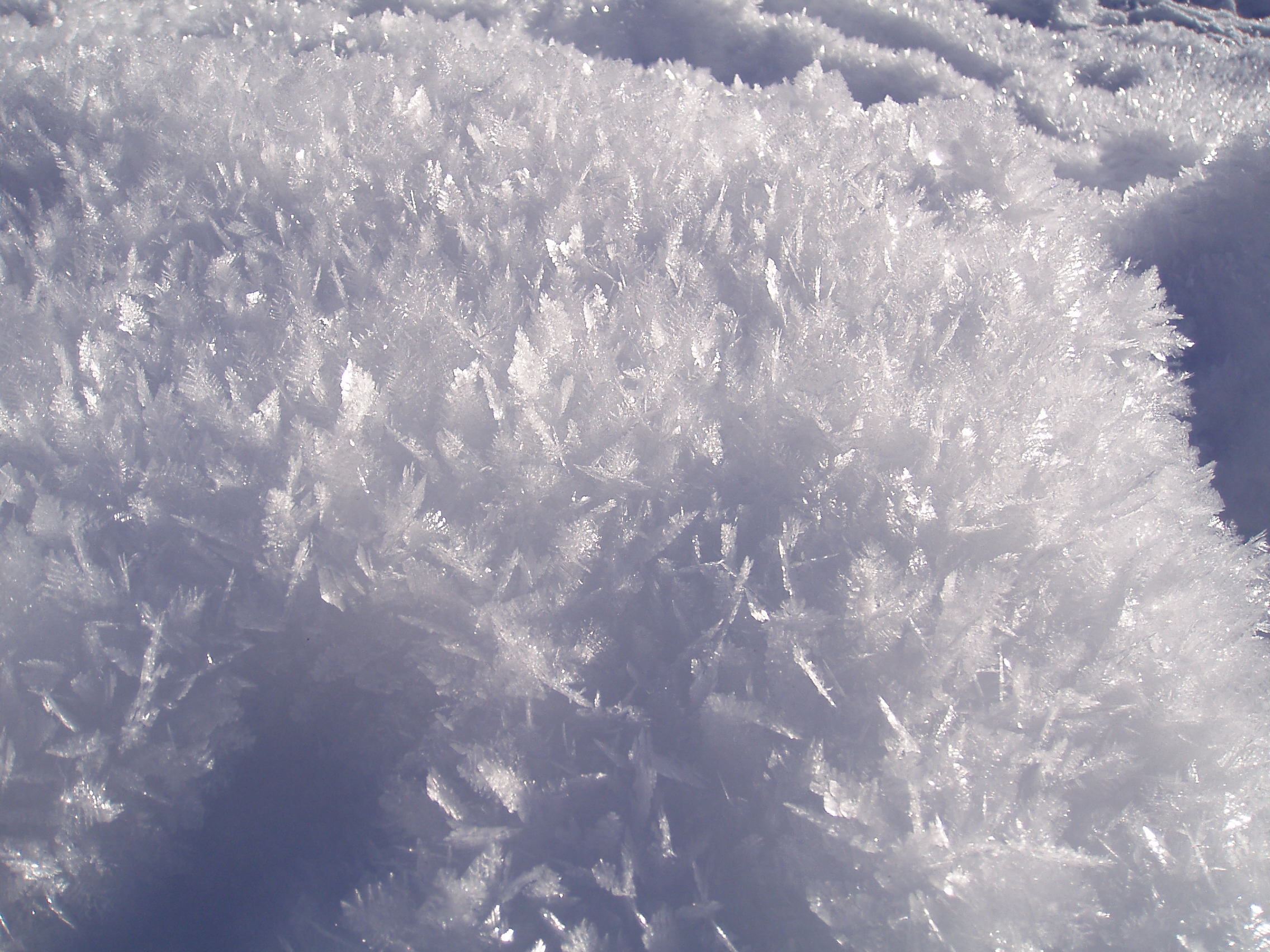
The texture of this top layer dependent on the weather history. The texture and physical properties of snow can change over time. The snow quality directly affects how a skier's equipment perform, and how the skier skis.

The motion of a skier is determined by the physical principles of the conservation of energy and the frictional forces acting on the body. For example, in downhill skiing, as the skier is accelerated down the hill by the force of gravity, their gravitational potential energy is converted to kinetic energy, the energy of motion. In the ideal case, all of the potential energy would be converted into kinetic energy; in reality, some of the energy is lost to heat due to friction.

One type of friction acting on the skier is the kinetic friction between the skis and snow. The force of friction acts in the direction opposite to the direction of motion, resulting in a lower velocity and less kinetic energy. The kinetic friction can be reduced by applying wax to the bottom of the skis which reduces the coefficient of friction. Different types of wax are manufactured for different temperature ranges because the snow quality changes depending on the current weather conditions and thermal history of the snow. The shape and construction material of a ski can also greatly impact the forces acting on a skier. Skis designed for use in powder condition are very different from skis designed for use on groomed trails. These design differences can be attributed to the differences in the snow quality.

An illustration of how snow quality can be different follows. In an area which experiences fluctuation in temperatures around 0°C - freezing temperature of water, both rain and snowfall are possible. Wet snow or the wet ground can freeze into a slippery sheet of ice. In an area which consistently experiences temperatures below 0°C, snowfall leads to accumulation of snow on the ground. When fresh, this snow is fluffy and powder-like. This type of snow has a lot of air space. Over time, this snow will become more compact, and the lower layers of snow will become more dense than the top layer. Skiers can use this type of information to improve their skiing experience by choosing the appropriate skis, wax, or by choosing to stay home. Search and rescue teams, and backcountry users rely on our understanding of snow to navigate the dangers present in the outdoors.

The second type of frictional force acting on a skier is drag. This is typically referred to as "air resistance". The drag force is proportional to the cross-sectional area of a body (e.g. the skier) and the square of its velocity and density relative to the fluid in which the body is traveling through (e.g. air). To go faster, a skier can try to reduce the cross-sectional area of their body. Downhill skiers can adopt more aerodynamic positions such as tucking. Alpine ski racers wear skin tight race suits. The general area of physics which addresses these forces is known as fluid dynamics.
