= Flapping counter-torque =

Ornithopter in flight.

Basic motion of the insect wing in insect with an indirect flight mechanism. Scheme of dorsoventral cut through a thorax segment with wings. a. wings b. joints c. dorsoventral muscles d. longitudinal muscle

Flapping counter-torque is a ubiquitous passive rotational damping effect in flapping flight that arises from world frame differences in the speed of flapping wings during turns. During a turns, flapping that is symmetrical (in velocity and speed) in the body frame of the animal is not symmetrical (in velocity or speed) in the lab frame.

During such turns, the wings travel at different speeds (despite no change to local velocity from the perspective of the flapping animal or machine). Thus, they create different amounts of lift and drag. At the speed and size of flapping animals, forces created by flapping are essentially proportional to the square of velocity relative to the fluid. Thus, even small asymmetries in (lab frame) velocity can create large asymmetries in forces or torques. In the case of flying animals, these torques counters the turn (and is thus known as "countertorque"). Flapping countertorque specifically describes this type of damping in flapping flight, though other passive damping (rotational coutertorque) effects which arise from flapping are in the process of being described in the scientific field of animal flight biomechanics.

The first paper to show this affect did so exclusively for yaw turns (rotations about the vertical axis). Tyson L. Hedrick, Bo Cheng, and Xinyan Deng released their research findings on the dynamics of turning and maneuverability during flight pertaining to flying animals in the report, Wingbeat Time and the Scaling of Passive Rotational Damping in Flapping Flight. Importantly, the damping was shown to be relevant to the flapping dynamics of animals, and on a time scale close to the period of wingbeats.

The researchers recorded the flight of hummingbirds and hawkmoths using 1,000 frame-per-second video cameras. The research expanded to four other kinds of flying insects, two species of birds and a bat which all use about the same number of wing beats to complete a turn in mid-flight. The flying animals returned to regular flapping to resume a straight course of flight.

This suggests higher wingbeat frequencies might allow both increased ability to maneuver and stabilize in flight.
