= GRINL1B =

Pseudogene in the species Homo sapiens

glutamate receptor, ionotropic, N-methyl D-aspartate-like 1B

Identifiers
- Symbol: GRINL1B
- NCBI gene: 84534
- HGNC: 15712
- OMIM: 608311
- UniProt: Q9BZD3

Other data
- Locus: Chr. 4 q12
Search for
- Structures: Swiss-model
- Domains: InterPro

Glutamate receptor, ionotropic, N-methyl D-aspartate-like 1B, also known as GRINL1B, is a human gene. The protein encoded by this gene is a subunit of the NMDA receptor.
