= Aggregate modulus =

In relation to biomechanics, the aggregate modulus (Ha) is a measurement of the stiffness of a material at equilibrium when fluid has ceased flowing through it, under the application of a constant load or strain in a confined compression configuration. The aggregate modulus can be calculated from Young's modulus (E) and the Poisson ratio (v).

$$Ha=\frac{E(1-v)}{(1+v)(1-2v)}$$

The aggregate modulus of a similar specimen is determined from a unidirectional deformational testing configuration, i.e., the only non-zero strain component is E_{11}. This configuration is opposed to the Young's modulus, which is determined from a unidirectional loading testing configuration, i.e., the only non-zero stress component is, say, in the e_{1} direction. In this test, the only non-zero component of the stress tensor is T_{11}.
