= CHRNB3 =

Protein-coding gene in humans

Identifiers
- Aliases: CHRNB3, cholinergic receptor nicotinic beta 3 subunit
- External IDs: OMIM: 118508; MGI: 106212; GeneCards: CHRNB3

Gene location (Human)
Chr.	Chromosome 8 (human)
Band	8p11.21	Start	42,697,366 bp
Band	8p11.21	End	42,737,407 bp

Gene location (Mouse)
Chr.	Chromosome 8 (mouse)
Band	8|8 A2	Start	27,858,739 bp
Band	8|8 A2	End	27,889,758 bp
RNA expression pattern
Bgee	Human / Mouse (ortholog); Top expressed in: testicle; pancreatic ductal cell; mucosa of ileum; tibialis anterior muscle; right testis; cerebellar cortex; cerebellar hemisphere; left testis; prefrontal cortex; substantia nigra / Top expressed in: neural layer of retina; inner nuclear layer; ganglion cell layer; habenula; outer nuclear layer; ventral tegmental area; primary visual cortex; spinal ganglia; meninges; superior frontal gyrus; More reference expression data
BioGPS	n/a
Gene ontology
Molecular function	channel activity; ion channel activity; extracellular ligand-gated ion channel activity; ligand-gated ion channel activity; acetylcholine-gated cation-selective channel activity; transmembrane signaling receptor activity; acetylcholine binding; acetylcholine receptor activity
Cellular component	integral component of membrane; postsynaptic membrane; membrane; plasma membrane; synapse; cell junction; acetylcholine-gated channel complex; dopaminergic synapse; integral component of plasma membrane; neuron projection
Biological process	response to nicotine; synaptic transmission, cholinergic; ion transport; neuromuscular synaptic transmission; signal transduction; regulation of postsynaptic membrane potential; excitatory postsynaptic potential; cation transmembrane transport; ion transmembrane transport; regulation of synaptic vesicle exocytosis; chemical synaptic transmission; regulation of membrane potential; nervous system process; protein heterooligomerization
Sources:Amigo / QuickGO
Orthologs
Databases	NCBI: entry; OMA: entry
Species	Human	Mouse
Entrez	1142	108043
Ensembl	ENSG00000147432	ENSMUSG00000031492
UniProt	Q05901	Q8BMN3
RefSeq (mRNA)	NM_000749; NM_001347717	NM_027454; NM_173212
RefSeq (protein)	NP_000740; NP_001334646	NP_081730; NP_775304
Location (UCSC)	Chr 8: 42.7 – 42.74 Mb	Chr 8: 27.86 – 27.89 Mb
PubMed search
- Wikidata
View/Edit Human	View/Edit Mouse

Neuronal acetylcholine receptor subunit beta-3 is a protein that in humans is encoded by the CHRNB3 gene. This gene has been identified as a candidate for predisposition to tobacco dependence.

== See also ==
- Nicotinic acetylcholine receptor
