= Pink algae =

Type of bacterial growth associated with PVC plastics

Pink algae is a growth of pink, slimey bacterial matter which can sometimes occur in pools and laboratory equipment. The name is a misnomer, because pink algae is not a true algae but is actually caused by a bacterium in the genus Methylobacterium. The color of the bacterial growth comes from pigments within its cells. The slime formed around the bacteria provides it with a relatively high level of protection from external threats. Like other species in its genus, pink algae is a methane consuming bacterium. It has an affinity for the matrix of PVC plastics, and will attach itself to both the inside and the outside of PVC materials inside of the pool. Pink algae infestation in a pool often occurs alongside an infestation of white water mold.

== Prevention ==
Preventing the growth of pink algae is preferable to removing it once accumulated. To ensure that pink algae does not grow in a pool, the owner must manually brush and clean all pool surfaces weekly, and regularly expose all pools surfaces to sunlight (pink algae thrives in a dark environment, particularly in areas with slow-moving water). Regular doses of certain chemicals are also recommended in a preventative plan against pink algae.

== Treatment ==
All visible pink algae must be manually removed from a pool. A dose of algicide, followed by a shock treatment is also necessary to destroy the bacteria. The pool filter must be run constantly until the water is clear and halogen or peroxide levels are normal, then the filter must be chemically cleaned.
