= Solute pumping =

Form of active transport of solute through a membrane

Solute pumping is a form of active transport of a solute through a cell membrane. Solute pumping allows a molecule that cannot regularly cross the lipid bilayer (because of concentration gradient, polarity, or other reasons) to enter the cell by way of a protein channel. Unlike diffusion (a form of passive transport), solute pumping requires energy (provided by ATP) to change the shape of the protein channel to allow the molecule to pass through, which is why it is an active transport mechanism.
