= Dendrosome =

Dendrosomes are vesicular, spherical, supramolecular entities wherein the dendrimer–nucleic acid complex is encapsulated within a lipophilic shell. The term " Dendrosome" meaning dendrimer encapsulated in Liposome was coined by Mohamed N. Sarbalouki. They possess negligible hemolytic toxicity and higher transfection efficiency, and they are better tolerated in vivo than are dendrimers. The word " Dendrosome" came from the Greek word "Dendron" meaning tree and " some" means vesicles. Thus dendrosomes are vesicular structures composed of dendrimers.

== Applications ==
Dendrosomes have been explored as vectors in gene delivery and genetic immunization.

Poly (propyleneimine) dendrosome based genetic immunization against Hepatitis B was found to be highly effective as compared to Dendrimer-Plasmid DNA complex, as reported by Tathagata Dutta, et.al. It has been postulated that in dendrosomes, the poly (propyleneimine) dendrimer–DNA complex is largely protected by multilamelarity of the vesicles. Moreover, it has been hypothesized that the lipoidal layers of the dendrosomes modifies the release pattern of the poly (propyleneimine) dendrimer –DNA complex, while some of the larger vesicles remain at the site of injection following their degradation by tissue phospholipases, the smaller ones delivering and transfecting efficiently the antigen-presenting cells (APC) in the draining lymph nodes. Dendrosomes have also been explored extensively for the delivery of s10siRNA targeting E6/E7 oncogenes in cervical cancer by Tathagata Dutta and Nigel AJ McMillan. It has been reported that polyamidoamine dendrimer based dendrosomes are efficient systems for the delivery of siRNA for effective management of cervical cancer.

== Toxicology ==
Dendrosome are reported to be completely nontoxic both in vitro as well as in vivo.
