= John C. Taschner =

John Carroll Taschner (born 1929/30) was a radiation biophysicist. He was a member of the technical staff in the Environment, Safety and Health Division of Los Alamos National Laboratory where he was involved in radiological transportation accident exercise planning.

Prior to coming to Los Alamos, Taschner was Deputy Director of the US Navy's Radiological Controls Program Office in Washington, DC, and has held numerous key health physics management positions with the US Navy, where he retired as a GM-15, he served as a part of the team responding to the accident at Three Mile Island while a staff member with the Bureau of Radiological Health, and served as an Air Force Health Physicist, where he retired as a lieutenant colonel. Since the 1970s, Taschner has served on several radiation protection standards committees. Since 1992, Taschner has been the Vice Chairman of the American National Standards Institute's N43 Committee, which writes radiation safety standards for non-medical radiation producing equipment.

As of March 2007, Taschner resided in Albuquerque, New Mexico. On September 1, 2017, Taschner died at the age of 87.

== Awards ==
Taschner has been a member of the Health Physics Society since 1958 and was an emeritus member of the American Academy of Health Physics. Taschner earned his M.S. in radiation biophysics from the University of Kansas in 1966 and, in 1973, received his certification in Health Physics by the American Board of Health Physics. After a career in the nuclear weapons business spanning 40 years, Taschner served as a member of the federal government's elite DOE/NNSA Accident Response Group. Taschner has been elected a Fellow in the Health Physics Society to honor his scientific contributions to the profession of health physics. The Military Health Physics Section of the Health Physics Society has named its highest award for excellence for John; the "John C. Taschner Leadership Award".
