= Journal of Applied Biomechanics =

- Discipline: Biomechanics
- Language: English
- Edited by: Jason R. Franz

Publication details
- History: 1985-present
- Publisher: Human Kinetics, Inc.
- Frequency: Bimonthly
- Impact factor: 1.606 (2021)

Standard abbreviations
- ISO 4: J. Appl. Biomech.

Indexing
- CODEN: JABOEG
- ISSN: 1065-8483 (print); 1543-2688 (web)
- LCCN: sf95095425
- OCLC no.: 488780724

Links
- Journal homepage; Online archive; Online archive

The Journal of Applied Biomechanics is a bimonthly peer-reviewed academic journal and an official journal of the International Society of Biomechanics. It covers research on musculoskeletal and neuromuscular biomechanics in human movement, sport, and rehabilitation.

== Abstracting and indexing ==
The journal is abstracted and indexed in Compendex, CINAHL, Science Citation Index Expanded, Current Contents/Clinical Medicine, Index Medicus/MEDLINE/PubMed, Embase, and Scopus.
