= Cyclic nucleotide-binding domain =

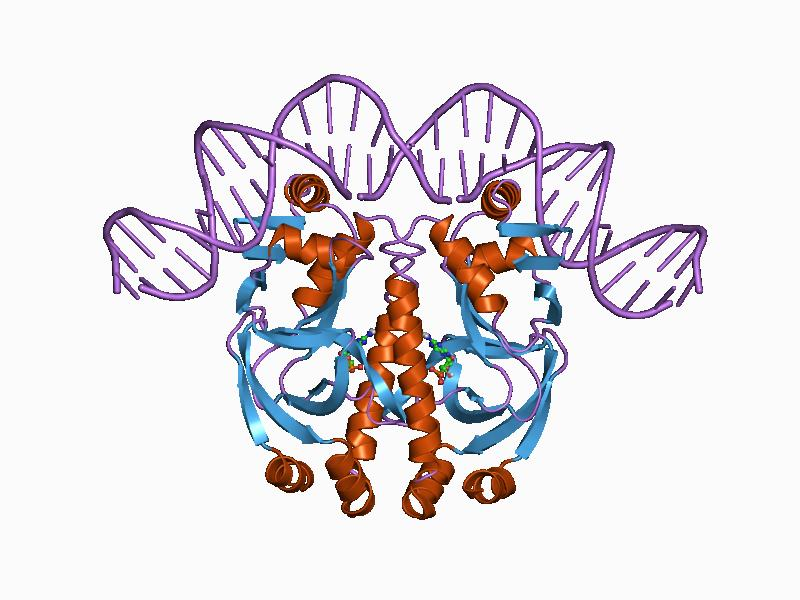
- Structure of a CAP-DNA complex.

Identifiers
- Symbol: cNMP_binding
- Pfam: PF00027
- InterPro: IPR000595
- SMART: SM00100
- PROSITE: PDOC00691
- SCOP2: 1cgp / SCOPe / SUPFAM
- CDD: cd00038
Available protein structures:
- Pfam: structures / ECOD
- PDB: RCSB PDB; PDBe; PDBj
- PDBsum: structure summary
- PDB: 1o7fA:375-462 2apk :153-242 1kmwR:154-243 1kmuR:154-243 1cx4A:170-259 1rl3A:153-238 1ne6A:153-238 1ne4A:153-238 1rgs :153-238 1apk :153-238 1pvkA:153-238 1u7eB:153-238 2bpk :275-372 1bpk :271-362 1q43A:535-620 1q5oA:535-620 1q3eA:535-620 1vp6C:253-336 1u12B:253-336 1i6xA:21-112 1hw5A:21-112 1j59B:21-112 1o3sA:21-112 1g6nB:21-112 1lb2A:21-112 1cgpB:21-112 1ruoB:21-112 2cgpA:21-112 1o3rA:21-112 1i5zB:21-112 1o3tA:21-112 1runA:21-112 1o3qA:21-112 1ft9A:25-107 1o5lA:12-103 1wgpA:532-632

Proteins that bind cyclic nucleotides (cAMP or cGMP) share a structural domain of about 120 residues. The best studied of these proteins is the prokaryotic catabolite gene activator (also known as the cAMP receptor protein) (gene crp) where such a domain is known to be composed of three alpha-helices and a distinctive eight-stranded, antiparallel beta-barrel structure. There are six invariant amino acids in this domain, three of which are glycine residues that are thought to be essential for maintenance of the structural integrity of the beta-barrel. cAMP- and cGMP-dependent protein kinases (cAPK and cGPK) contain two tandem copies of the cyclic nucleotide-binding domain. The cAPK's are composed of two different subunits, a catalytic chain and a regulatory chain, which contains both copies of the domain. The cGPK's are single chain enzymes that include the two copies of the domain in their N-terminal section. Vertebrate cyclic nucleotide-gated ion-channels also contain this domain. Two such cations channels have been fully characterized, one is found in rod cells where it plays a role in visual signal transduction.

== Human proteins containing this domain ==
CNBD1; CNGA1; CNGA2; CNGA3; CNGB1; CNGB3; HCN1; HCN2; HCN3; HCN4; KCNH1; KCNH2; KCNH3; KCNH4; KCNH5; KCNH6; KCNH7; KCNH8; PNPLA6; PNPLA7; PRKAR1A; PRKAR1B; PRKAR2A; PRKAR2B; PRKG1; PRKG2; RAPGEF2; RAPGEF3; RAPGEF4; RAPGEF6; RCNC2; SLC9A10; SLC9A11;
