= Sudden unexpected death in epilepsy =

Fatal complication of epilepsy

- Specialty: Neurology

Sudden unexpected death in epilepsy (SUDEP) is a fatal complication of epilepsy. It is defined as the sudden and unexpected, non-traumatic and non-drowning death of a person with epilepsy, without a toxicological or anatomical cause of death detected during the post-mortem examination.

While the mechanisms underlying SUDEP are still poorly understood, it is possibly the most common cause of death as a result of complications from epilepsy, accounting for between 7.5 and 17% of all epilepsy-related deaths and 50% of all deaths in refractory epilepsy. The causes of SUDEP seem to be multifactorial and include respiratory, cardiac, and cerebral factors as well as the severity of epilepsy and seizures. Proposed pathophysiological mechanisms include seizure-induced cardiac and respiratory arrests.

Among epileptics, SUDEP occurs in about 1 in 1,000 adults and 1 in 4,500 children annually. Rates of death as a result of prolonged seizures (status epilepticus) are not classified as SUDEP.

== Categories ==
The overarching term SUDEP can be subdivided into four different categories: Definite, Probably, Possible, and Unlikely.

1. Definite SUDEP: a non-traumatic and non-drowning death in an individual with epilepsy, without a cause of death after postmortem examination.
  - Definite SUDEP Plus: includes the presence of a concomitant condition other than epilepsy, where death may be due to the combined effects of both epilepsy and the other condition.
2. Probably SUDEP: all the same criteria for Definite SUDEP are met, but no postmortem examination is performed.
3. Possible SUDEP: insufficient information is available regarding the death, with no postmortem examination.
4. Unlikely SUDEP: an alternate cause of death has been determined, ruling out the possibility of SUDEP being the cause.

== Risk factors ==
Consistent risk factors include:

- Severity of seizures, increased refractoriness of epilepsy and presence of generalized tonic–clonic seizures: the most consistent risk factor is an increased frequency of tonic–clonic seizures.
- Poor compliance. Lack of therapeutic levels of anti-epileptic drugs, non-adherence to treatment regimens and frequent changes in regimens are risk factors for sudden death.
- Young age and early age of seizures onset.
- Male sex.
- Being asleep during a seizure is likely to favour SUDEP occurrence.
- Individuals with a history of substance abuse or alcohol dependence are found to have a twofold higher risk of SUDEP.

Genetic mutations have been identified that increase a person's risk for SUDEP (some are discussed below), but ultimately their genetic risk is determined by the function of multiple genes that is not yet well understood. Overlap is seen between these ion channel genes and the different sudden death disorders, including SUDEP, SIDS, sudden unexpected death (SUD), and sudden unexplained death in childhood (SUDC). Many of the genes are involved in long QT syndrome.

- Mutations in the KCNQ1 gene that codes for the voltage-gated potassium channel K_{V}7.1 have been implicated in cardiac arrhythmias, such as long QT syndrome 1 (LQT1), and epilepsy.
- Mutations in potassium channel gene KCNH2 have been identified with LQT2.
- Mutations in sodium channel gene SCN5A have been identified with LQT3.
- Mutations in potassium channel gene KCNJ2 have been identified with LQT7.
- Mutations in calcium channel gene CACNA1C have been identified with LQT8.
- The sodium ion channel genes SCN1A, SCN1B, SCN2A, and SCN8A and the potassium channel KCNA1 have been implicated in both epilepsy and SUDEP.

== Mechanism ==
The mechanisms underlying SUDEP are not well understood but probably involve several pathophysiological mechanisms and circumstances. The most commonly involved are seizure-induced hypoventilation and cardiac arrhythmias, but different mechanisms may be involved in different individuals, and more than one mechanism may be involved in any one individual.

- Cardiac factors: cardiac arrhythmias and other cardiac events are known to be involved in some cases of SUDEP. Such arrhythmias are defined as ictal arrhythmias and include the ictal asystole, which is a rare occurrence mostly in people that have temporal lobe epilepsy.
- Respiratory factors: impaired respiration and seizure-induced pulmonary dysfunction as well as central apnea as a result of brain-stem respiratory centers suppression is known to play a role in some cases of SUDEP.
- Cerebral and autonomic nervous system dysregulation: cardiac arrhythmia and respiratory failure as a result of seizure-related changes to brain function and dysfunction of the autonomic nervous system have been described in cases of SUDEP. These include cases of post-ictal generalized EEG suppression described as cerebral shutdown, but its significance remains unclear.
- Genetic factors: mutations in several genes have been associated with an increased susceptibility to SUDEP. Over 33% of these are related to mutations which lead to increased susceptibility for arrhythmia. Genes involved include the hyperpolarization-activated cyclic nucleotide-gated channels genes (HCN1, HCN2, HCN3 and HCN4).
- Anti epileptic drugs: most evidence suggests that antiepileptic drugs are not associated with an increased risk for SUDEP, but rather reduce its incidence. Some studies however indicate that some antiepileptic drugs such as lamotrigine and carbamazepine, may increase the risk of SUDEP in females and certain individuals. It is unclear if this is because of the potential cardio-respiratory adverse effects such as lengthening of the QT interval and reduction of heart rate known to be associated with these drugs under certain circumstances, or because a high drug dosage could be a surrogate marker for poor seizure control.
- Vagal nerve stimulation: concerns have been raised that vagal nerve stimulation may induce bradycardia or cardiac arrest and may exacerbate sleep apnoea common in people with epilepsy.

== Management ==
Currently, the most effective strategy to protect against SUDEP in childhood epilepsy is seizure control, but this approach is not completely effective and is particularly challenging in cases of intractable epilepsy. The lack of generally recognized clinical recommendations available are a reflection of the dearth of data on the effectiveness of any particular clinical strategy, but based on present evidence, the following may be relevant:

- Epileptic seizure control with the appropriate use of medication and lifestyle counseling is the focus of prevention.
- Detection of seizures using wristbands which can alert carers in case the wearer has stopped breathing or has a heart problem.
- Reduction of stress, participation in physical exercises, and night supervision might minimize the risk of SUDEP.
- Knowledge of how to perform the appropriate first-aid responses to seizure by persons who live with epileptic people may prevent death.
- People with arrhythmias associated with seizures should be submitted to extensive cardiac investigation to determine the indication for on-demand cardiac pacing.
- Successful epilepsy surgery may reduce the risk of SUDEP, but this depends on the outcome in terms of seizure control.
- The use of anti-suffocation pillows has been advocated by some practitioners to improve respiration while sleeping, but their effects remain unproven because experimental studies are lacking.
- Providing information to individuals and relatives about SUDEP is beneficial.
- Night time supervision.

== Epidemiology ==
- In the US, prevalence of SUDEP is approximately 1.16 cases for every 1000 people with epilepsy per year. In comparison, a study in Denmark found that among 1-35 year old individuals, the incidence of sudden cardiac death (SCD) was 1.9 cases per 100,000 person-years, while 1 in 2000 infants in the Western world will die from SIDS in the first year of life. This means that sudden, unexpected death is more common among individuals with epilepsy when compared to infants or the general population.
- SUDEP accounts for 8–17% of deaths in people with epilepsy.
- The risk of sudden death in young adults with epilepsy is increased 20-40-fold compared to the general population.
- SUDEP is the number one cause of epilepsy-related death in people with pharmacoresistant epilepsy.
- Children with epilepsy have a cumulative risk of dying suddenly of 7% within 40 years.
- Within the pediatric population, SUDEP accounts for 30-50% of the deaths in severe early onset epilepsies, affecting between 1 in 500 and 1 in 1000 epilepsy patients yearly.

== See also ==
- Martha Parke Custis
- Cameron Boyce
- John McGeoch
