= HCN channel =

Intermembrane proteins

Hyperpolarization-activated cyclic nucleotide–gated (HCN) channels are integral membrane proteins that serve as nonselective voltage-gated cation channels in the plasma membranes of heart and brain cells. HCN channels are sometimes referred to as pacemaker channels because they help to generate rhythmic activity within groups of heart and brain cells. HCN channels are activated by membrane hyperpolarization, are permeable to Na^{+} and K^{+}, and are constitutively open at voltages near the resting membrane potential. HCN channels are encoded by four genes (HCN1, 2, 3, 4) and are widely expressed throughout the heart and the central nervous system.

The current through HCN channels, designated I_{f} or I_{h}, plays a key role in the control of cardiac and neuronal rhythmicity and is called the pacemaker current or "funny" current. Expression of single isoforms in heterologous systems such as human embryonic kidney (HEK) cells, Chinese hamster ovary (CHO) cells and Xenopus oocytes yield homotetrameric channels able to generate ion currents with properties similar to those of the native I_{f}/I_{h} current, but with quantitative differences in the voltage-dependence, activation/deactivation kinetics and sensitivity to the nucleotide cyclic AMP (cAMP): HCN1 channels have a more positive threshold for activation, faster activation kinetics, and a lower sensitivity to cAMP, while HCN4 channels are slowly gating and strongly sensitive to cAMP. HCN2 and HCN3 have intermediate properties.

== Structure ==
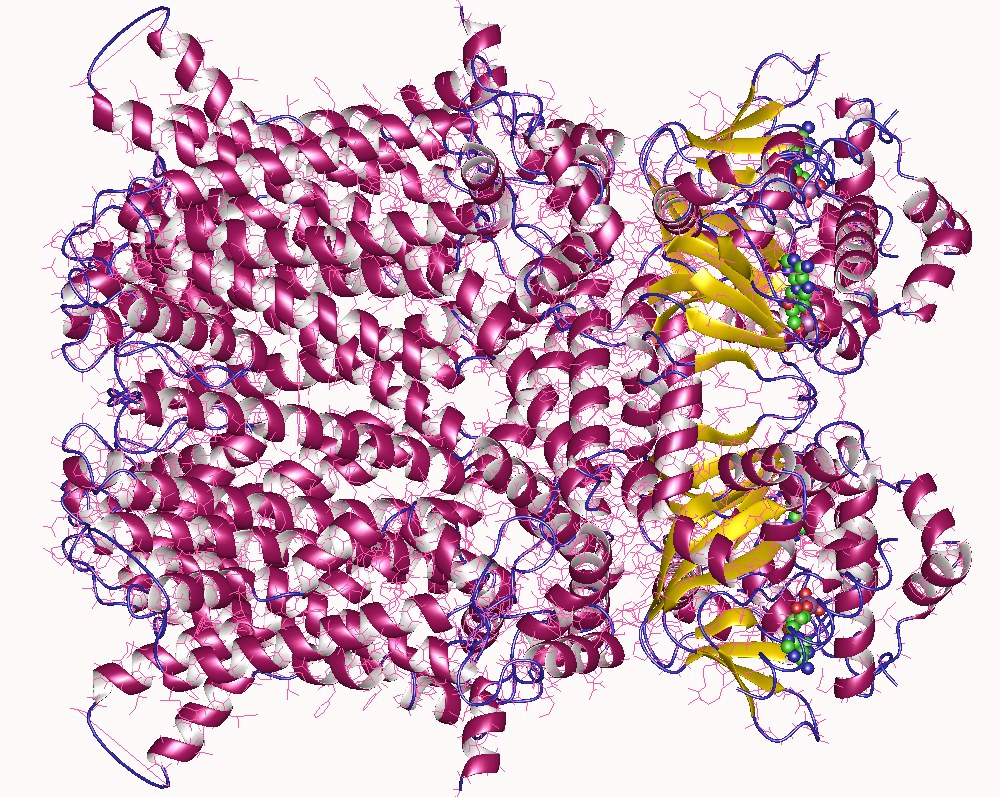
Human HCN1 channel tetramer

Hyperpolarization-activated and cyclic nucleotide–gated (HCN) channels belong to the superfamily of voltage-gated K^{+} (Kv) and cyclic nucleotide–gated (CNG) channels. HCN channels are thought to consist of four either identical or non-identical subunits that are integrally embedded in the cell membrane to create an ion-conducting pore. Each subunit comprises six membrane-spanning (S1–6) domains which include a putative voltage sensor (S4) and a pore region between S5 and S6 carrying the GYG triplet signature of K^{+}-permeable channels, and a cyclic nucleotide-binding domain (CNBD) in the C-terminus. HCN isoforms are highly conserved in their core transmembrane regions and cyclic nucleotide binding domain (80–90% identical), but diverge in their amino- and carboxy-terminal cytoplasmic regions.

HCN channels are regulated by both intracellular and extracellular molecules, but most importantly, by cyclic nucleotides (cAMP, cGMP, cCMP). Binding of cyclic nucleotides lowers the threshold potential of HCN channels, thus activating them. cAMP is a primary agonist of HCN2 while cGMP and cCMP may also bind to it. All three, however, are potent agonists.

== Cardiac function ==
HCN4 is the main isoform expressed in the sinoatrial node, but low levels of HCN1 and HCN2 have also been reported. The current through HCN channels, called the pacemaker current (I_{f}), plays a key role in the generation and modulation of cardiac rhythmicity, as they are responsible for the spontaneous depolarization in pacemaker action potentials in the heart. HCN4 isoforms are regulated by cCMP and cAMP and these molecules are agonists at I_{f}.

== Function in the nervous system ==
All four HCN subunits are expressed in the brain. In addition to their proposed roles in pacemaking rhythmic or oscillatory activity, HCN channels may control the way that neurons respond to synaptic input. Initial studies suggest roles for HCN channels in sour taste, coordinated motor behavior and aspects of learning and memory. Clinically, there is evidence that HCN channels play roles in epilepsy and neuropathic pain. HCN channels have been shown to be important for activity-dependent mechanisms for olfactory sensory neuron growth.

HCN1 and 2 channels have been found in dorsal root ganglia, basal ganglia, and the dendrites of neurons in the hippocampus. It has been found that human cortical neurons have particularly high amount of HCN1 channel expression in all layers. HCN channel trafficking along dendrites in the hippocampus of rats has shown that HCN channels are quickly shuttled to the surface in response to neural activity. HCN channels have also been observed in the retrotrapezoid nucleus (RTN), a respiratory control center that responds to chemical signals such as CO_{2}. When HCN is inhibited, serotonin fails to stimulate chemoreceptors in the RTN. This illustrates a connection between HCN channels and respiratory regulation. Due to the complex nature of HCN channel regulation, as well as the complex interactions between multiple ion channels, HCN channels are fine-tuned to respond to certain thresholds and agonists. This complexity is believed to affect neural plasticity.

HCN1/2 channels on pyramidal cells in the prefrontal cortex also contribute to a rapid form of neuroplasticity called Dynamic Network Connectivity, where HCN channels interact with Slack (KCNT1) potassium channels on dendritic spines to flexibly gate network inputs and coordinate arousal state with cognitive state. Alpha-2A-adrenergic receptors co-localize with HCN channels on prefrontal cortical dendritic spines, closing the HCN channels and strengthening prefrontal cortical connections and function. The alpha-2A agonist, guanfacine, a medication used to treat Attention Deficit Hyperactivity Disorder and other cognitive disorders, acts by this mechanism.

== History ==
HCN channel was first identified in 1976 in the heart by Noma and Irisawa and characterized by Brown, Difrancesco and Weiss

== See also ==
- Cyclic nucleotide-gated ion channel
