= Cyclic nucleotide =

Cyclic nucleic acid

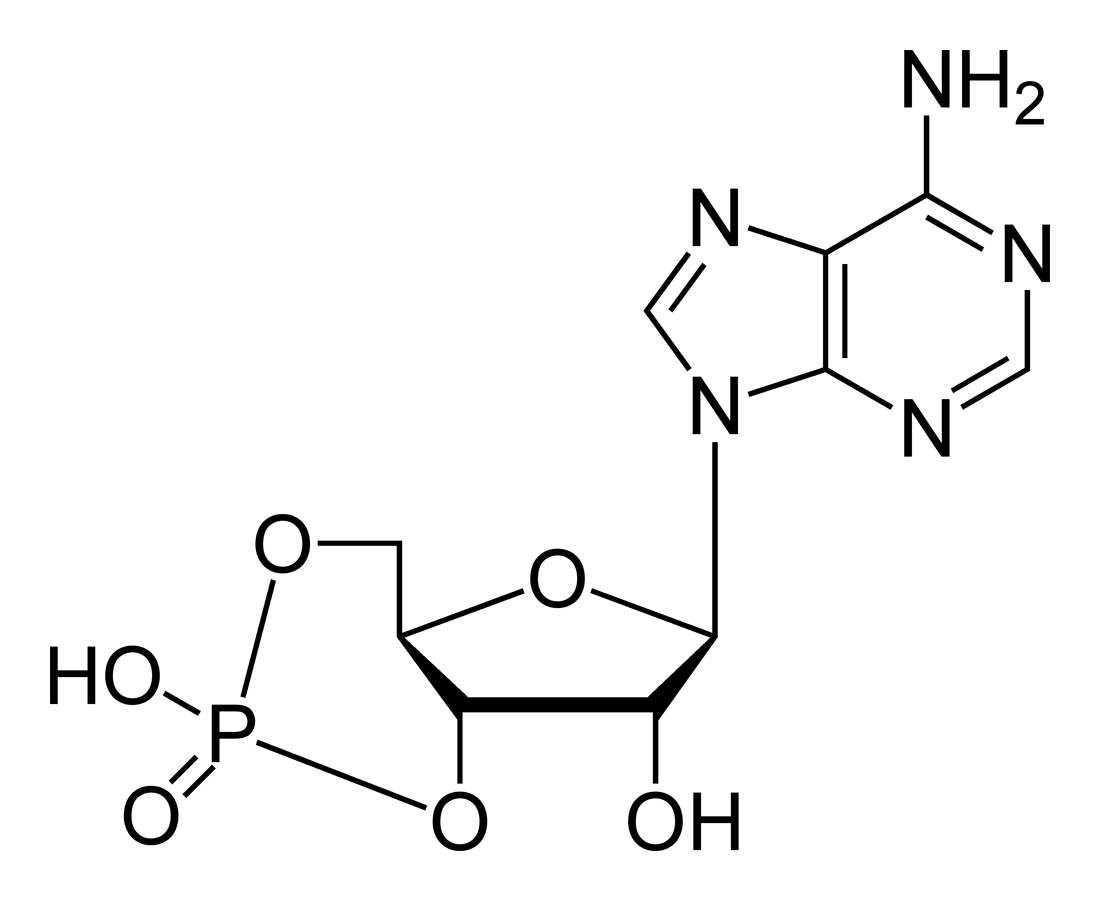
Cyclic adenosine monophosphate. The cyclic portion refers to the two single bonds between the phosphate group and the ribose

A cyclic nucleotide (cNMP) is a single-phosphate nucleotide with a cyclic bond arrangement between the sugar and phosphate groups. Like other nucleotides, cyclic nucleotides are composed of three functional groups: a sugar, a nitrogenous base, and a single phosphate group. As can be seen in the cyclic adenosine monophosphate (cAMP) and cyclic guanosine monophosphate (cGMP) images, the 'cyclic' portion consists of two bonds between the phosphate group and the 3' and 5' hydroxyl groups of the sugar, very often a ribose.

Their biological significance includes a broad range of protein-ligand interactions. They have been identified as secondary messengers in both hormone and ion-channel signalling in eukaryotic cells, as well as allosteric effector compounds of DNA binding proteins in prokaryotic cells. cAMP and cGMP are currently the most well documented cyclic nucleotides, however there is evidence that cCMP (with cytosine) is also involved in eukaryotic cellular messaging. The role of cyclic uridine monophosphate (cUMP) is even less well known.

Discovery of cyclic nucleotides has contributed greatly to the understanding of kinase and phosphatase mechanisms, as well as protein regulation in general. Although more than 50 years have passed since their initial discovery, interest in cyclic nucleotides and their biochemical and physiological significance continues.

== History ==
The understanding of the concept of second messengers, and in particular the role of cyclic nucleotides and their ability to relay physiological signals to a cell, has its origins in the research of glycogen metabolism by Carl and Gerty Cori, for which they were awarded a Nobel Prize in Physiology or Medicine in 1947. A number of incremental but important discoveries through the 1950s added to their research, primarily focusing on the activity of glycogen phosphorylase in dog liver. Glycogen phosphorylase catalyzes the first step in glycogenolysis, the process of breaking glycogen into its substituent glucose parts. Earl Sutherland investigated the effect of the hormones adrenaline and glucagon on glycogen phosphorylase, earning him the Nobel Prize in Physiology or Medicine in 1971.

In 1956 Edwin Krebs and Edmond Fischer discovered that adenosine triphosphate (ATP) is required for the conversion of glycogen phosphorylase b to glycogen phosphorylase a. While investigating the action of adrenaline on glycogenolysis the next year, Sutherland and Walter Wosilait reported that inorganic phosphate is released when the enzyme liver phosphorylase is inactivated; but when it is activated, it incorporates a phosphate. The "active factor" that the hormones produced was finally purified in 1958, and then identified as containing a ribose, a phosphate, and an adenine in equal ratios. Further, it was proved that this factor reverted to 5'-AMP when it was inactivated.

Evgeny Fesenko, Stanislav Kolesnikov, and Arkady Lyubarsky discovered in 1985 that cyclic guanosine monophosphate (cGMP) can initiate the photoresponse in rods. Soon after, the role of cNMP in gated ion channels of chemosensitive cilia of olfactory sensory neurons was reported by Tadashi Nakamura and Geoffrey Gold. In 1992 Lawrence Haynes and King-Wai Yau uncovered cNMP's role in the light-dependent cyclic-nucleotide-gated channel of cone photoreceptors. By the end of the decade, the presence of two types of intramembrane receptors was understood: Rs (which stimulates cyclase) and Ri (which inhibits cyclase). Wei-Jen Tang and James Hurley reported in 1998 that adenylyl cyclase, which synthesizes cAMP, is regulated not only by hormones and neurotransmitters, but also by phosphorylation, calcium, forskolin, and guanine nucleotide-binding proteins (G proteins).

== Chemistry of cNMPs ==
=== Structure ===
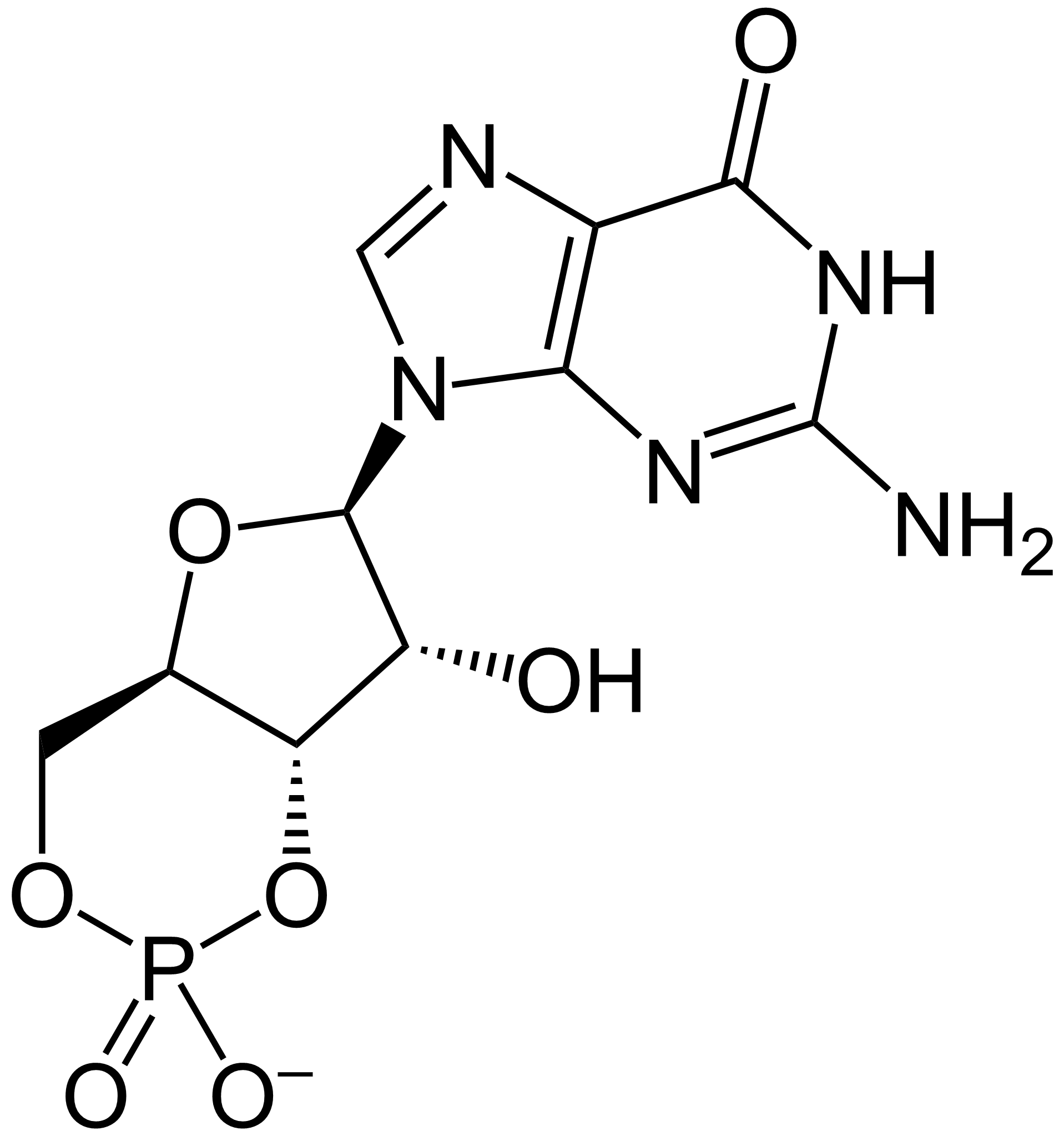
Cyclic guanosine monophosphate. The cyclic portion refers to the two single bonds between the phosphate group and the ribose

The two most well-studied cyclic nucleotides are cyclic AMP (cAMP) and cyclic GMP (cGMP), while cyclic CMP (cCMP) and cyclic UMP (cUMP) are less understood. cAMP is 3'5'-cyclic adenosine monophosphate, cGMP is 3'5'-cyclic guanosine monophosphate, cCMP is cytidine 3',5'-monophosphate, and cUMP is uridine 3',5'-cyclic phosphate.

Each cyclic nucleotide has three components. It contains a nitrogenous base (meaning it contains nitrogen): for example, adenine in cAMP and guanine in cGMP. It also contains a sugar, specifically the five-carbon ribose. And finally, a cyclic nucleotide contains a phosphate. A double-ring purine is the nitrogenous base for cAMP and cGMP, while cytosine, thymine, and uracil each have a single-ring nitrogenous base (pyrimidine).

These three components are connected so that the nitrogenous base is attached to the first carbon of ribose (1' carbon), and the phosphate group is attached to the 5' carbon of ribose. While all nucleotides have this structure, the phosphate group makes a second connection to the ribose ring at the 3' carbon in cyclic nucleotides. Because the phosphate group has two separate bonds to the ribose sugar, it forms a cyclic ring.

The atom numbering convention is used to identify the carbons and nitrogens within a cyclic nucleotide. In the pentose, the carbon closest to the carbonyl group is labeled C-1. When a pentose is connected to a nitrogenous base, carbon atom numbering is distinguished with a prime (') notation, which differentiates these carbons from the atom numbering of the nitrogenous base.

Therefore, for cAMP, 3'5'-cyclic adenosine monophosphate indicates that a single phosphate group forms a cyclic structure with the ribose group at its 3' and 5' carbons, while the ribose group is also attached to adenosine (this bond is understood to be at the 1' position of the ribose).

== Biochemistry ==
Cyclic nucleotides are found in both prokaryotic and eukaryotic cells. Control of intracellular concentrations is maintained through a series of enzymatic reactions involving several families of proteins. In higher order mammals, cNMPs are present in many types of tissue.

=== Synthesis and Degradation ===
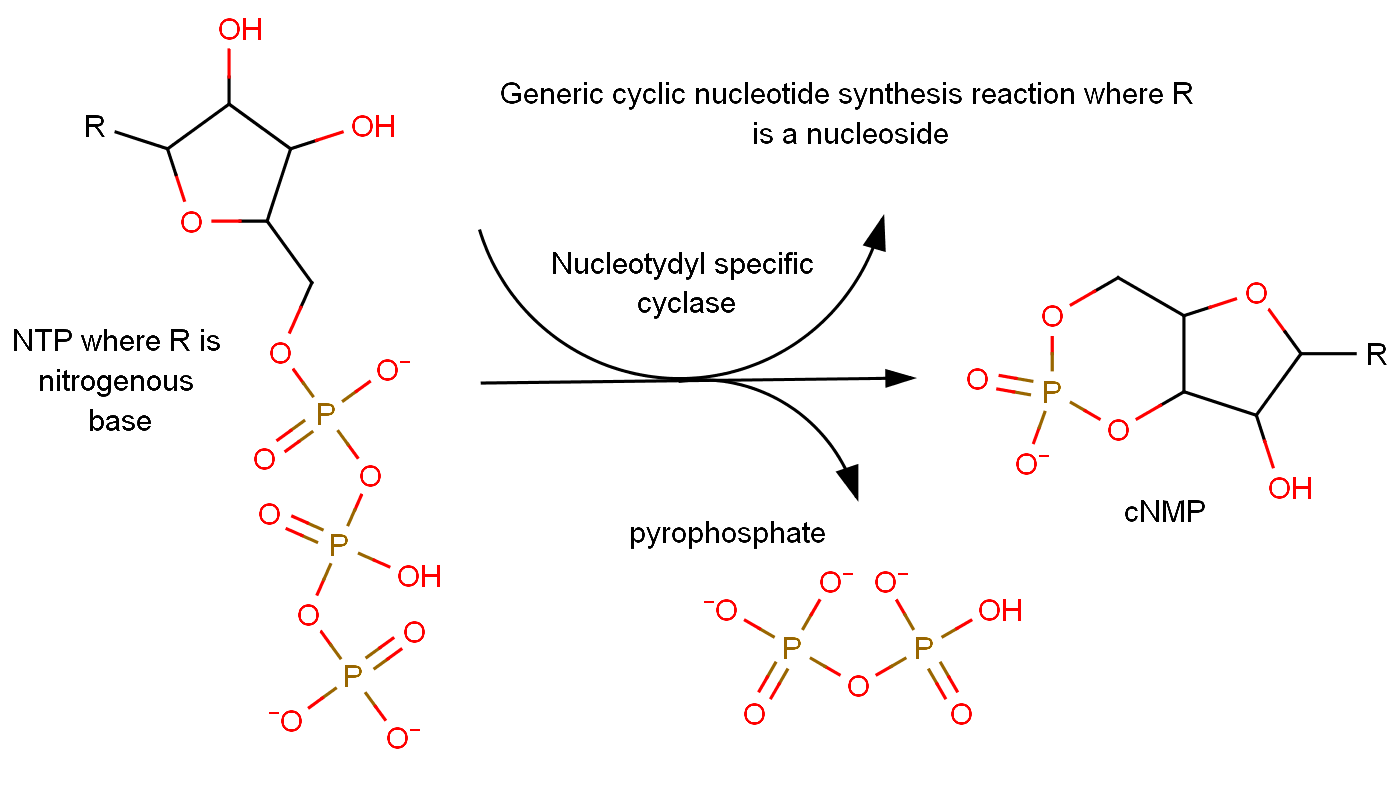
Generic cyclic nucleotide biosynthesis reaction by cyclase

Cyclic nucleotides are produced from the generic reaction NTP → cNMP + PP_{i}, where N represents a nitrogenous base. The reaction is catalyzed by specific nucleotidyl cyclases, such that production of cAMP is catalyzed by adenylyl cyclase and production of cGMP is catalyzed by guanylyl cyclase. Adenylyl cyclase has been found in both a transmembrane and cytosolic form, representing distinct protein classes and different sources of cAMP.

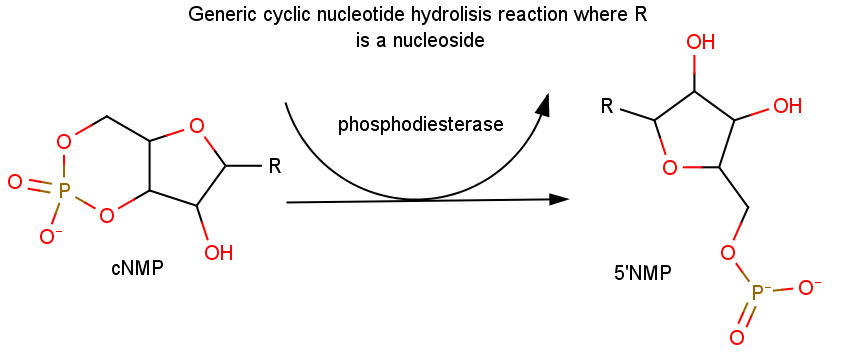
Generic hydrolysis reaction of 3' cNMP phosphodiester bond by phosphodiesterase

Both cAMP and cGMP are degraded by hydrolysis of the 3' phosphodiester bond, resulting in a 5'NMP. Degradation is carried out primarily by a class of enzymes known as phosphodiesterases (PDEs). In mammalian cells, there are 11 known PDE families with varying isoforms of each protein expressed based on the cell's regulatory needs. Some phosphodiesterases are cNMP-specific, while others can hydrolyze non-specifically. However, the cAMP and cGMP degradation pathways are much more understood than those for either cCMP or cUMP. The identification of specific PDEs for cCMP and cUMP has not been as thoroughly established.

=== Target Binding ===
Cyclic nucleotides can be found in many different types of eukaryotic cells, including photo-receptor rods and cones, smooth muscle cells and liver cells. Cellular concentrations of cyclic nucleotides can be very low, in the 10^{−7}M range, because metabolism and function are often localized in particular parts of the cell. A highly conserved cyclic nucleotide-binding domain (CNB) is present in all proteins that bind cNMPs, regardless of their biological function. The domain consists of a beta sandwich architecture, with the cyclic nucleotide binding pocket between the beta sheets. The binding of cNMP causes a conformational change that affects the protein's activity. There is also data to support a synergistic binding effect amongst multiple cyclic nucleotides, with cCMP lowering the effective concentration (EC_{50}) of cAMP for activation of protein kinase A (PKA).

== Biology ==
Cyclic nucleotides are integral to a communication system that acts within cells. They act as "second messengers" by relaying the signals of many first messengers, such as hormones and neurotransmitters, to their physiological destinations. Cyclic nucleotides participate in many physiological responses, including receptor-effector coupling, down-regulation of drug responsiveness, protein-kinase cascades, and transmembrane signal transduction.

Cyclic nucleotides act as second messengers when first messengers, which cannot enter the cell, instead bind to receptors in the cellular membrane. The receptor changes conformation and transmits a signal that activates an enzyme in the cell membrane interior called adenylyl cyclase. This releases cAMP into the cell interior, where it stimulates a protein kinase called cyclic AMP-dependent protein kinase. By phosphorylating proteins, cyclic AMP-dependent protein kinase alters protein activity. cAMP's role in this process terminates upon hydrolysis to AMP by phosphodiesterase.

Cyclic nucleotide	Known binding proteins	Pathway/Biological association
cAMP	1. protein kinase A 2. cyclic nucleotide-gated ion channels 3. Epac; 4. Catabolite Activator Protein (CAP)	1. smooth muscle relaxation 2. photo/olfactory receptors 3. glucagon production in pancreatic beta cells 4. lac operon regulation in E. coli
cGMP	1. cGMP-dependent protein kinase (PKG); 2. cyclic nucleotide-gated ion channels	1. smooth muscle relaxation 2. photo/olfactory receptors
cCMP	1. cGMP kinase I 2. protein kinase A	1. smooth muscle relaxation

Cyclic nucleotides are well-suited to act as second messengers for several reasons. Their synthesis is energetically favorable, and they are derived from common metabolic components (ATP and GTP). When they break down into AMP/GMP and inorganic phosphate, these components are non-toxic. Finally, cyclic nucleotides can be distinguished from non-cyclic nucleotides because they are smaller and less polar.

=== Biological significance ===
The involvement of cyclic nucleotides on biological functions is varied, while an understanding of their role continues to grow. There are several examples of their biological influence. They are associated with long-term and short-term memory. They also work in the liver to coordinate various enzymes that control blood glucose and other nutrients. In bacteria, cyclic nucleotides bind to catabolite gene activator protein (CAP), which acts to increase metabolic enzymatic activity by increasing the rate of DNA transcription. They also facilitate relaxation of smooth muscle cells in vascular tissue, and activate cyclic CNG channels in retinal photoreceptors and olfactory sensory neurons. In addition, they potentially activate cyclic CNG channels in: pineal gland light sensitivity, sensory neurons of the vomeronasal organ (which is involved in the detection of pheromones), taste receptor cells, cellular signaling in sperm, airway epithelial cells, gonadotropin-releasing hormone (GnRH)-secreting neuronal cell line, and renal inner medullary collecting duct.

=== Pathway mutations and related diseases ===
Examples of disruptions of cNMP pathways include: mutations in CNG channel genes are associated with degeneration of the retina and with color blindness; and overexpression of cytosolic or soluble adenylyl cyclase (sAC) has been linked to human prostate carcinoma. Inhibition of sAC, or knockdown by RNA interference (RNAi) transfection has been shown to prevent the proliferation of the prostate carcinoma cells. The regulatory pathway appears to be part of the EPAC pathway and not the PKA pathway.

Phosphodiesterases, principle regulators of cNMP degradation, are often targets for therapeutics. Caffeine is a known PDE inhibitor, while drugs used for the treatment of erectile dysfunction like sildenafil and tadalafil also act through inhibiting the activity of phosphodiesterases.
