= Cyclic nucleotide-gated channel alpha 1 =

Protein-coding gene in the species Homo sapiens

CNGA1

Identifiers
- Aliases: CNGA1, CNCG, CNCG1, CNG-1, CNG1, RCNC1, RCNCa, RCNCalpha, RP49, Cyclic nucleotide-gated channel alpha 1, cyclic nucleotide gated channel alpha 1, cyclic nucleotide gated channel subunit alpha 1
- External IDs: OMIM: 123825; MGI: 88436; GeneCards: CNGA1

Gene location (Human)
Chr.	Chromosome 4 (human)
Band	4p12	Start	47,935,977 bp
Band	4p12	End	48,016,681 bp

Gene location (Mouse)
Chr.	Chromosome 5 (mouse)
Band	5 C3.2|5 38.44 cM	Start	72,761,039 bp
Band	5 C3.2|5 38.44 cM	End	72,801,618 bp
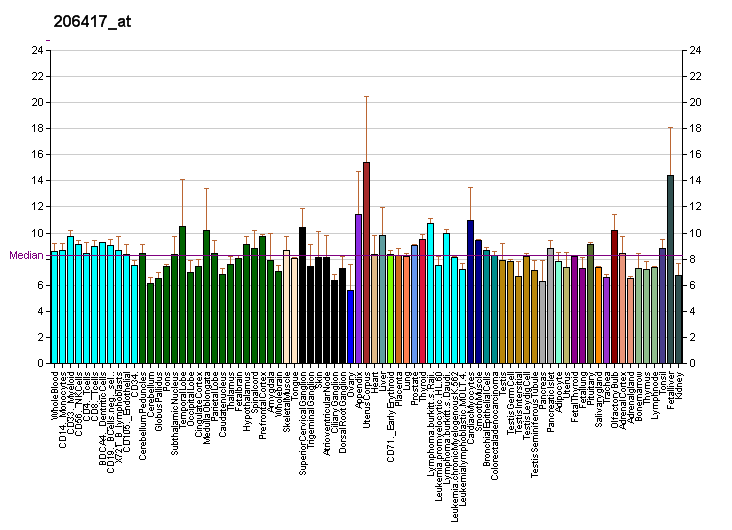
RNA expression pattern
Bgee	Human / Mouse (ortholog); Top expressed in: amniotic fluid; right lobe of liver; sural nerve; pancreatic epithelial cell; testicle; pancreatic ductal cell; mucosa of urinary bladder; skin of abdomen; skin of hip; corpus epididymis / Top expressed in: neural layer of retina; retinal pigment epithelium; epithelium of lens; ciliary body; iris; thymus; corneal stroma; zygote; conjunctival fornix; secondary oocyte; More reference expression data
BioGPS	More reference expression data
Gene ontology
Molecular function	nucleotide binding; intracellular cyclic nucleotide activated cation channel activity; ion channel activity; protein binding; voltage-gated potassium channel activity; cGMP binding; intracellular cAMP-activated cation channel activity; intracellular cGMP-activated cation channel activity
Cellular component	integral component of membrane; membrane; plasma membrane; photoreceptor outer segment; integral component of plasma membrane; photoreceptor outer segment membrane
Biological process	response to stimulus; regulation of rhodopsin mediated signaling pathway; regulation of membrane potential; ion transport; cation transmembrane transport; transmembrane transport; visual perception; rhodopsin mediated signaling pathway; potassium ion transmembrane transport
Sources:Amigo / QuickGO
Orthologs
Databases	NCBI: entry; OMA: entry
Species	Human	Mouse
Entrez	1259	12788
Ensembl	ENSG00000198515	ENSMUSG00000067220
UniProt	P29973	P29974
RefSeq (mRNA)	NM_000087; NM_001142564; NM_001379270	NM_007723
RefSeq (protein)	NP_000078; NP_001136036; NP_001366199; NP_000078.2	NP_031749
Location (UCSC)	Chr 4: 47.94 – 48.02 Mb	Chr 5: 72.76 – 72.8 Mb
PubMed search
- Wikidata
View/Edit Human	View/Edit Mouse

Cyclic nucleotide-gated channel alpha 1, also known as CNGA1, is a human gene encoding an ion channel protein. Heterologously expressed CNGA1 can form a functional channel that is permeable to calcium. In rod photoreceptors, however, CNGA1 forms a heterotetramer with CNGB1 in a 3:1 ratio. The addition of the CNGB1 channel imparts altered properties including more rapid channel kinetics and greater cAMP-activated current. When light hits rod photoreceptors, cGMP concentrations decrease causing rapid closure of CNGA1/B1 channels and, therefore, hyperpolarization of the membrane potential.

== See also ==
- Cyclic nucleotide-gated ion channel
