= Cyclic nucleotide-gated channel alpha 4 =

Protein-coding gene in the species Homo sapiens

CNGA4

Identifiers
- Aliases: CNGA4, CNCA2, CNG-4, CNG4, CNG5, CNGB2, OCNC2, OCNCBETA, OCNCb, Cyclic nucleotide-gated channel alpha 4, cyclic nucleotide gated channel alpha 4, cyclic nucleotide gated channel subunit alpha 4
- External IDs: OMIM: 609472; MGI: 2664099; GeneCards: CNGA4

Gene location (Human)
Chr.	Chromosome 11 (human)
Band	11p15.4	Start	6,234,765 bp
Band	11p15.4	End	6,244,479 bp

Gene location (Mouse)
Chr.	Chromosome 7 (mouse)
Band	7|7 E3	Start	105,053,775 bp
Band	7|7 E3	End	105,057,949 bp
RNA expression pattern
Bgee	Human / Mouse (ortholog); Top expressed in: gonad; right uterine tube; testicle; bronchial epithelial cell; olfactory zone of nasal mucosa; left testis; right testis; C1 segment; right lung; mucosa of paranasal sinus / Top expressed in: olfactory epithelium; zygote; secondary oocyte; granulocyte; primary oocyte; dentate gyrus of hippocampal formation granule cell; spermatid; superior frontal gyrus; primary visual cortex; testicle; More reference expression data
BioGPS	n/a
Gene ontology
Molecular function	nucleotide binding; cAMP binding; voltage-gated potassium channel activity; ion channel activity; intracellular cAMP-activated cation channel activity; intracellular cGMP-activated cation channel activity; cGMP binding
Cellular component	Golgi-associated vesicle membrane; integral component of membrane; Golgi membrane; membrane; ciliary membrane; integral component of plasma membrane
Biological process	transmembrane transport; response to stimulus; sensory perception of smell; ion transport; ion transmembrane transport; regulation of membrane potential; potassium ion transmembrane transport; cation transmembrane transport
Sources:Amigo / QuickGO
Orthologs
Databases	NCBI: entry; OMA: entry
Species	Human	Mouse
Entrez	1262	233649
Ensembl	ENSG00000132259	ENSMUSG00000030897
UniProt	Q8IV77	Q3UW12
RefSeq (mRNA)	NM_001037329	NM_001033317
RefSeq (protein)	NP_001032406	NP_001028489
Location (UCSC)	Chr 11: 6.23 – 6.24 Mb	Chr 7: 105.05 – 105.06 Mb
PubMed search
- Wikidata
View/Edit Human	View/Edit Mouse

Cyclic nucleotide-gated cation channel alpha-4 is a protein that in humans is encoded by the CNGA4 gene.

CNGA4 is a modulatory subunit of vertebrate cyclic nucleotide-gated membrane channels that transduce odorant signals (Munger et al., 2001).[supplied by OMIM]

== See also ==
- Cyclic nucleotide-gated ion channel
