= Cyclic nucleotide gated channel beta 3 =

Protein-coding gene in the species Homo sapiens

CNGB3

Identifiers
- Aliases: CNGB3, ACHM1, Cyclic nucleotide gated channel beta 3, cyclic nucleotide gated channel subunit beta 3
- External IDs: OMIM: 605080; MGI: 1353562; GeneCards: CNGB3

Gene location (Human)
Chr.	Chromosome 8 (human)
Band	8q21.3	Start	86,553,977 bp
Band	8q21.3	End	86,743,675 bp

Gene location (Mouse)
Chr.	Chromosome 4 (mouse)
Band	4|4 A3	Start	19,280,850 bp
Band	4|4 A3	End	19,510,623 bp
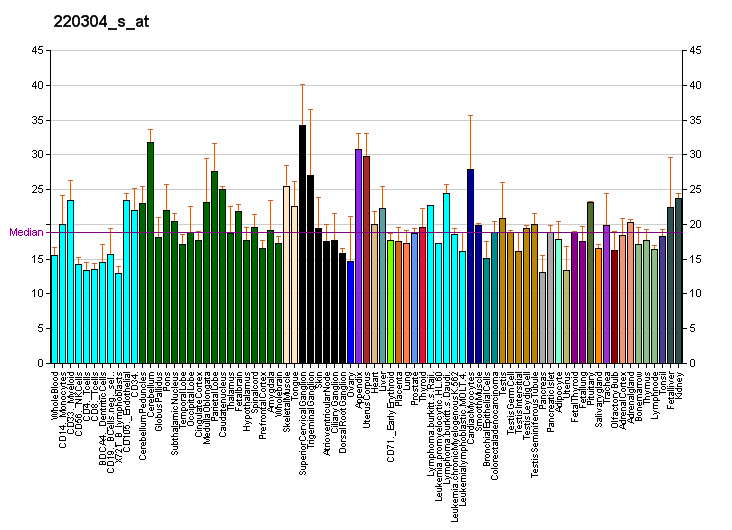
RNA expression pattern
Bgee	Human / Mouse (ortholog); Top expressed in: testicle; retinal pigment epithelium; gonad; Achilles tendon; male germ cell; sperm; corpus callosum; Epithelium of choroid plexus; apex of heart; bone marrow / Top expressed in: pineal gland; neural layer of retina; spermatid; lumbar subsegment of spinal cord; myocardium of ventricle; epithelium of lens; lumbar spinal ganglion; trachea; right ventricle; tibiofemoral joint; More reference expression data
BioGPS	More reference expression data
Gene ontology
Molecular function	intracellular cGMP-activated cation channel activity; voltage-gated potassium channel activity; nucleotide binding; cGMP binding; intracellular cyclic nucleotide activated cation channel activity; intracellular cAMP-activated cation channel activity
Cellular component	integral component of membrane; photoreceptor outer segment; membrane; transmembrane transporter complex; integral component of plasma membrane
Biological process	regulation of membrane potential; cation transport; ion transport; cation transmembrane transport; signal transduction; visual perception; response to stimulus; potassium ion transmembrane transport
Sources:Amigo / QuickGO
Orthologs
Databases	NCBI: entry; OMA: entry
Species	Human	Mouse
Entrez	54714	30952
Ensembl	ENSG00000170289	ENSMUSG00000056494
UniProt	Q9NQW8	Q9JJZ9
RefSeq (mRNA)	NM_019098	NM_013927
RefSeq (protein)	NP_061971	NP_038955
Location (UCSC)	Chr 8: 86.55 – 86.74 Mb	Chr 4: 19.28 – 19.51 Mb
PubMed search
- Wikidata
View/Edit Human	View/Edit Mouse

Cyclic nucleotide gated channel beta 3, also known as CNGB3, is a human gene encoding an ion channel protein.

== See also ==
- Cyclic nucleotide-gated ion channel
- Stargardt disease
