= Cyclic nucleotide-gated channel alpha 2 =

Protein-coding gene in humans

CNGA2

Identifiers
- Aliases: CNGA2, CNCA, CNCA1, CNG2, OCNC1, OCNCALPHA, OCNCa, Cyclic nucleotide-gated channel alpha 2, cyclic nucleotide gated channel alpha 2, cyclic nucleotide gated channel subunit alpha 2
- External IDs: OMIM: 300338; MGI: 108040; GeneCards: CNGA2

Gene location (Human)
| Chr. | X chromosome (human) |
| Band | Xq28 | Start | 151,734,746 bp |
| Band | Xq28 | End | 151,745,564 bp |

Gene location (Mouse)
| Chr. | X chromosome (mouse) |
| Band | X|X A7.3 | Start | 71,035,455 bp |
| Band | X|X A7.3 | End | 71,053,824 bp |
RNA expression pattern
| Bgee | Human / Mouse (ortholog); Top expressed in: testicle; left testis / Top expressed in: olfactory epithelium; urethra; embryo; secondary oocyte; zygote; primary oocyte; entorhinal cortex; central gray substance of midbrain; superior frontal gyrus; thymus; More reference expression data |
| BioGPS | n/a |
Gene ontology
| Molecular function | nucleotide binding; cAMP binding; calmodulin binding; ion channel activity; voltage-gated potassium channel activity; intracellular cAMP-activated cation channel activity; intracellular cGMP-activated cation channel activity; cGMP binding |
| Cellular component | integral component of membrane; membrane; Golgi membrane; ciliary membrane; Golgi-associated vesicle membrane; integral component of plasma membrane |
| Biological process | response to stimulus; regulation of membrane potential; ion transport; sensory perception of smell; ion transmembrane transport; transmembrane transport; potassium ion transmembrane transport; cation transmembrane transport |
Sources:Amigo / QuickGO
Orthologs
| Databases | NCBI: entry; OMA: entry |
| Species | Human | Mouse |
| Entrez | 1260 | 12789 |
| Ensembl | ENSG00000183862 | ENSMUSG00000005864 |
| UniProt | Q16280 | Q62398 |
| RefSeq (mRNA) | NM_005140 | NM_007724 |
| RefSeq (protein) | NP_005131 | NP_031750 |
| Location (UCSC) | Chr X: 151.73 – 151.75 Mb | Chr X: 71.04 – 71.05 Mb |
| PubMed search |
- Wikidata
| View/Edit Human | View/Edit Mouse |

Cyclic nucleotide gated channel alpha 2, also known as CNGA2, is a human gene encoding an ion channel protein.

== See also ==
- Cyclic nucleotide-gated ion channel
