= Cyclic nucleotide-gated channel alpha 3 =

Protein found in humans

CNGA3

Identifiers
- Aliases: CNGA3, ACHM2, CCNC1, CCNCa, CCNCalpha, CNCG3, CNG3, Cyclic nucleotide-gated channel alpha 3, cyclic nucleotide gated channel alpha 3, cyclic nucleotide gated channel subunit alpha 3
- External IDs: OMIM: 600053; MGI: 1341818; GeneCards: CNGA3
Available structures
PDB	Ortholog search: PDBe RCSB
PDB	List of PDB id codes 3SWY

Gene location (Human)
Chr.	Chromosome 2 (human)
Band	2q11.2	Start	98,346,188 bp
Band	2q11.2	End	98,398,601 bp

Gene location (Mouse)
Chr.	Chromosome 1 (mouse)
Band	1|1 B	Start	37,253,515 bp
Band	1|1 B	End	37,302,465 bp
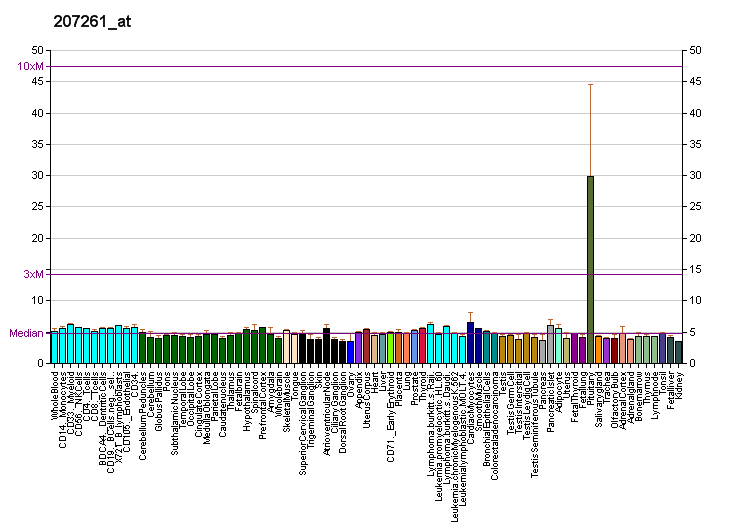
RNA expression pattern
Bgee	Human / Mouse (ortholog); Top expressed in: ventricular zone; testicle; ganglionic eminence; islet of Langerhans; pituitary gland; anterior pituitary; muscle layer of sigmoid colon; gastric mucosa; right uterine tube; C1 segment / Top expressed in: neural layer of retina; spermatid; embryo; quadriceps femoris muscle; male reproductive system; testicle; muscle tissue; blastocyst; anterior segment of eyeball; lens; More reference expression data
BioGPS	More reference expression data
Gene ontology
Molecular function	intracellular cGMP-activated cation channel activity; nucleotide binding; cGMP binding; ion channel activity; ligand-gated ion channel activity; voltage-gated potassium channel activity; protein C-terminus binding; intracellular cAMP-activated cation channel activity
Cellular component	cytoplasm; integral component of membrane; perikaryon; membrane; soma; dendrite; photoreceptor outer segment membrane; transmembrane transporter complex; integral component of plasma membrane; plasma membrane; axon initial segment; glial cell projection
Biological process	response to stimulus; regulation of membrane potential; cation transport; response to magnesium ion; ion transport; ion transmembrane transport; response to corticosteroid; transmembrane transport; response to cAMP; signal transduction; visual perception; cation transmembrane transport; potassium ion transmembrane transport; inorganic cation import across plasma membrane
Sources:Amigo / QuickGO
Orthologs
Databases	NCBI: entry; OMA: entry
Species	Human	Mouse
Entrez	1261	12790
Ensembl	ENSG00000144191	ENSMUSG00000026114
UniProt	Q16281	Q9JJZ8
RefSeq (mRNA)	NM_001079878; NM_001298	NM_001282010; NM_009918
RefSeq (protein)	NP_001073347; NP_001289	NP_001268939; NP_034048
Location (UCSC)	Chr 2: 98.35 – 98.4 Mb	Chr 1: 37.25 – 37.3 Mb
PubMed search
- Wikidata
View/Edit Human	View/Edit Mouse

Cyclic nucleotide-gated cation channel alpha-3 is a protein that in humans is encoded by the CNGA3 gene.

== Function ==
This gene encodes a member of the cyclic nucleotide-gated cation channel protein family, which is required for normal vision and olfactory signal transduction. CNGA3 is expressed in cone photoreceptors and is necessary for color vision. Missense mutations in this gene are associated with rod monochromacy and segregate in an autosomal recessive pattern. Two alternatively-spliced transcripts encoding different isoforms have been described.

== Clinical relevance ==
Variants in this gene have been shown to cause achromatopsia and colour blindness.

== See also ==
- Cyclic nucleotide-gated ion channel
