= HCN1 =

Protein-coding gene in the species Homo sapiens

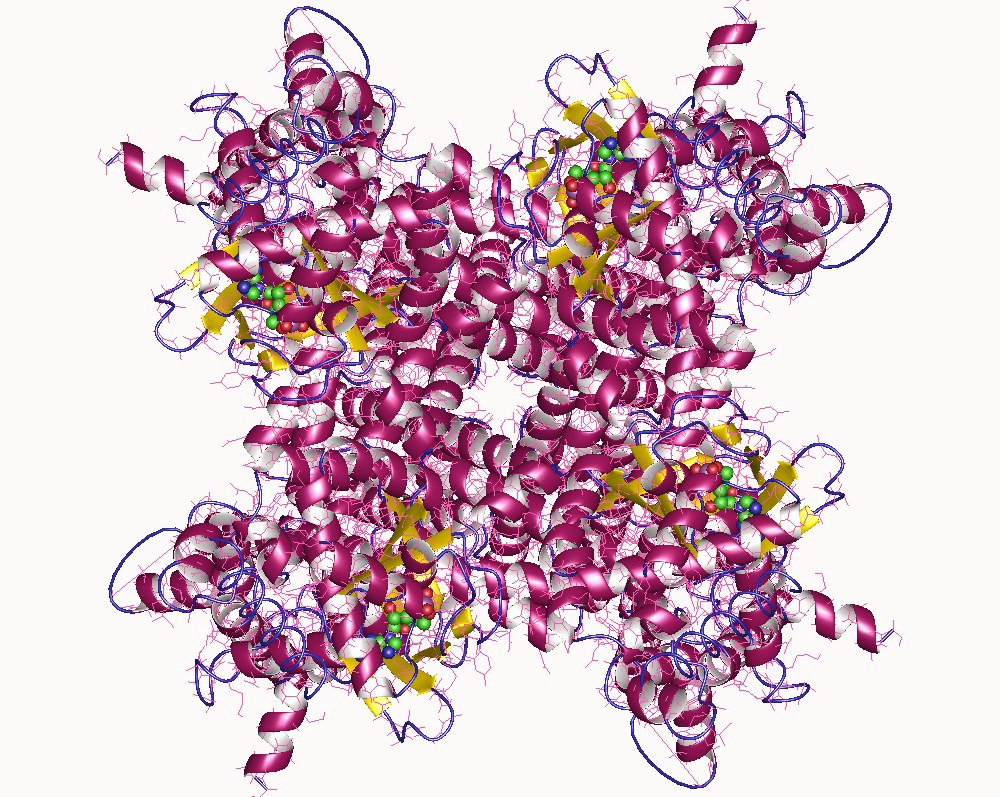

Identifiers
- Aliases: HCN1, BCNG-1, BCNG1, EIEE24, HAC-2, hyperpolarization activated cyclic nucleotide gated potassium channel 1, GEFSP10, DEE24
- External IDs: OMIM: 602780; MGI: 1096392; GeneCards: HCN1
Available structures
PDB	Ortholog search: PDBe RCSB
PDB	List of PDB id codes 3U0Z

Gene location (Human)
Chr.	Chromosome 5 (human)
Band	5p12	Start	45,254,948 bp
Band	5p12	End	45,696,498 bp

Gene location (Mouse)
Chr.	Chromosome 13 (mouse)
Band	13 D2.3|13 66.34 cM	Start	117,738,856 bp
Band	13 D2.3|13 66.34 cM	End	118,123,954 bp
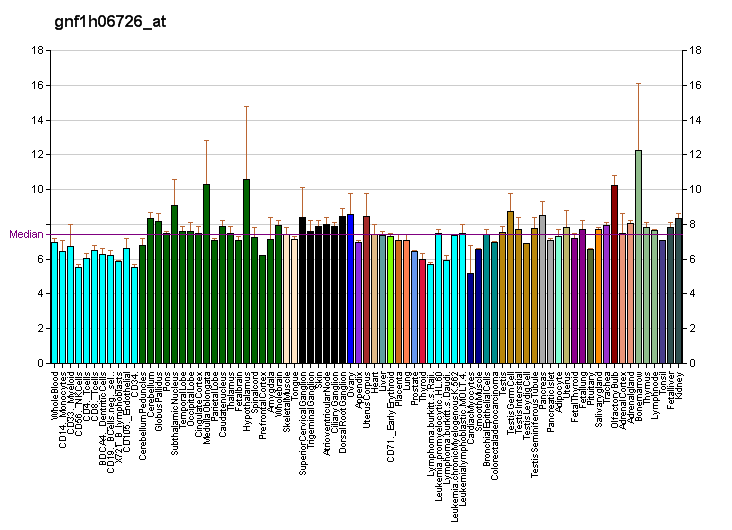
RNA expression pattern
Bgee	Human / Mouse (ortholog); Top expressed in: endothelial cell; Brodmann area 23; primary visual cortex; trigeminal ganglion; Brodmann area 46; spinal ganglia; prefrontal cortex; superior frontal gyrus; middle temporal gyrus; parietal lobe / Top expressed in: subiculum; medial vestibular nucleus; pontine nuclei; deep cerebellar nuclei; cerebellar vermis; facial motor nucleus; lobe of cerebellum; lumbar spinal ganglion; anterior horn of spinal cord; inferior colliculi; More reference expression data
BioGPS	More reference expression data
Gene ontology
Molecular function	nucleotide binding; intracellular cAMP-activated cation channel activity; identical protein binding; voltage-gated sodium channel activity; ion channel activity; potassium channel activity; sodium channel activity; voltage-gated ion channel activity; voltage-gated potassium channel activity; voltage-gated cation channel activity; cAMP binding; protein binding
Cellular component	axon; membrane; dendrite; plasma membrane; integral component of membrane; HCN channel complex; integral component of plasma membrane
Biological process	transmembrane transport; retinal cone cell development; regulation of ion transmembrane transport; apical protein localization; ion transport; sodium ion transport; regulation of membrane potential; sodium ion transmembrane transport; potassium ion transmembrane transport; potassium ion transport; protein homotetramerization; cellular response to cAMP
Sources:Amigo / QuickGO
Orthologs
Databases	NCBI: entry; OMA: entry
Species	Human	Mouse
Entrez	348980	15165
Ensembl	ENSG00000164588	ENSMUSG00000021730
UniProt	O60741	O88704
RefSeq (mRNA)	NM_021072	NM_010408
RefSeq (protein)	NP_066550	NP_034538
Location (UCSC)	Chr 5: 45.25 – 45.7 Mb	Chr 13: 117.74 – 118.12 Mb
PubMed search
- Wikidata
View/Edit Human	View/Edit Mouse

Potassium/sodium hyperpolarization-activated cyclic nucleotide-gated channel 1 is a protein that in humans is encoded by the HCN1 gene.

== Function ==
Hyperpolarization-activated cation channels of the HCN gene family, such as HCN1, contribute to spontaneous rhythmic activity in both heart and brain.

== Tissue distribution ==
HCN1 channel expression is found in the sinoatrial node, the neocortex, hippocampus, cerebellar cortex, dorsal root ganglion, trigeminal ganglion and brainstem.

== Ligands ==
- Ketamine is an inhibitor of HCN1 in addition to its other targets.
- Propofol also inhibits HCN1.
- Isoflurane and Sevoflurane inhibit HCN1.

== Interactions ==
HCN1 has been shown to interact with HCN2.

== Epilepsy ==
De novo mutations in HCN1 cause epilepsy.

== See also ==
- Cyclic nucleotide-gated ion channel
