= RAPGEF6 =

Protein-coding gene in the species Homo sapiens

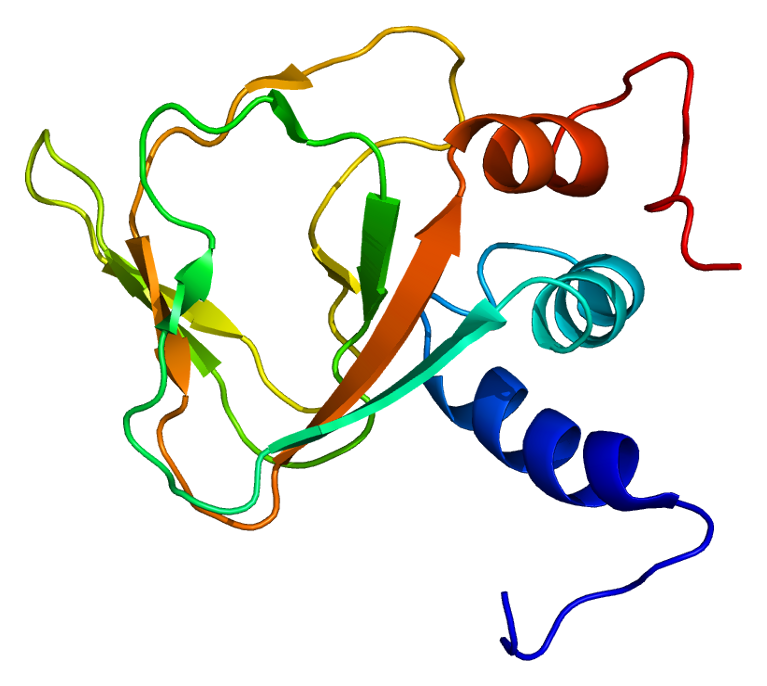

Identifiers
- Aliases: RAPGEF6, KIA001LB, PDZ-GEF2, PDZGEF2, RA-GEF-2, RAGEF2, Rap guanine nucleotide exchange factor 6
- External IDs: OMIM: 610499; MGI: 2384761; GeneCards: RAPGEF6
Available structures
PDB	Human UniProt search: PDBe RCSB
PDB	List of PDB id codes 2D93, 3LNY

Gene location (Human)
Chr.	Chromosome 5 (human)
Band	5q31.1	Start	131,423,921 bp
Band	5q31.1	End	131,635,231 bp

Gene location (Mouse)
Chr.	Chromosome 11 (mouse)
Band	11|11 B1.3	Start	54,413,673 bp
Band	11|11 B1.3	End	54,590,111 bp
RNA expression pattern
Bgee	Human / Mouse (ortholog); Top expressed in: corpus callosum; pancreatic epithelial cell; Achilles tendon; sperm; Brodmann area 23; cerebellar vermis; superficial temporal artery; subthalamic nucleus; mucosa of ileum; Brodmann area 46 / Top expressed in: lymph node; mesenteric lymph nodes; trigeminal ganglion; Paneth cell; spermatocyte; blood; granulocyte; spleen; facial motor nucleus; Rostral migratory stream; More reference expression data
BioGPS	n/a
Gene ontology
Molecular function	phosphatidic acid binding; GTP-dependent protein binding; protein binding; guanyl-nucleotide exchange factor activity
Cellular component	cytoplasm; cytosol; plasma membrane; endocytic vesicle; apical plasma membrane; membrane; centrosome
Biological process	regulation of GTPase activity; small GTPase mediated signal transduction; positive regulation of GTPase activity; Ras protein signal transduction; microvillus assembly; protein localization to plasma membrane; establishment of endothelial intestinal barrier; signal transduction
Sources:Amigo / QuickGO
Orthologs
Databases	NCBI: entry; OMA: entry
Species	Human	Mouse
Entrez	51735	192786
Ensembl	ENSG00000158987	ENSMUSG00000037533
UniProt	Q8TEU7	n/a
RefSeq (mRNA)	NM_016340; NM_001164386; NM_001164387; NM_001164388; NM_001164389 NM_001164390	NM_001252494; NM_001252496; NM_001252497; NM_001252498; NM_175258
RefSeq (protein)	NP_001157858; NP_001157859; NP_001157860; NP_001157861; NP_001157862 NP_057424	n/a
Location (UCSC)	Chr 5: 131.42 – 131.64 Mb	Chr 11: 54.41 – 54.59 Mb
PubMed search
- Wikidata
View/Edit Human	View/Edit Mouse

Rap guanine nucleotide exchange factor 6 is a protein that in humans is encoded by the RAPGEF6 gene.
