= Cardiac rhythmicity =

Rhythm of heart beat

Cardiac rhythmicity is the spontaneous depolarization and repolarization event that occurs in a repetitive and stable manner within the cardiac muscle. Rhythmicity is often abnormal or lost in cases of cardiac dysfunction or cardiac failure. It is the ability of the heart to maintain a relatively stable relation between its systole and diastole. Not increasing one on the expense of the other. However, external factors may lead to the disruption of the heart's rhythmicity.
