= HCN4 =

Protein-coding gene in the species Homo sapiens

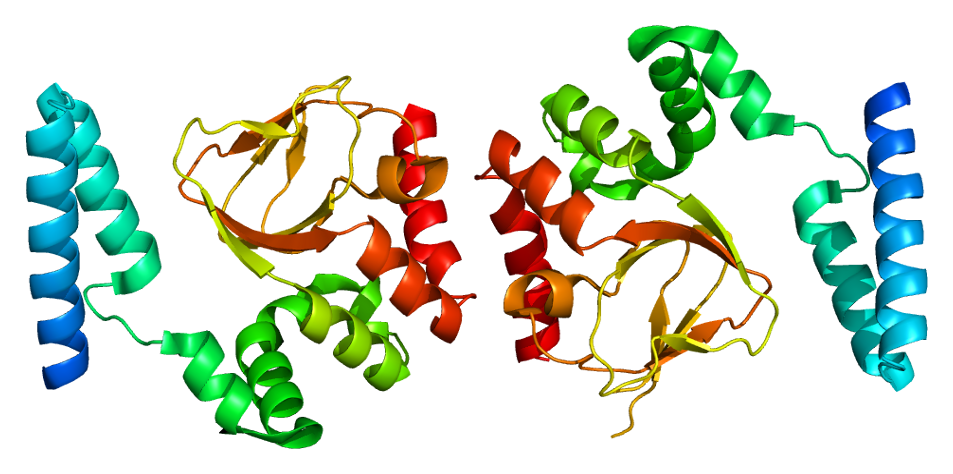

Identifiers
- Aliases: HCN4, SSS2, hyperpolarization activated cyclic nucleotide gated potassium channel 4, BRGDA8, EIG18
- External IDs: OMIM: 605206; MGI: 1298209; GeneCards: HCN4
Available structures
| PDB | Ortholog search: PDBe RCSB |
| PDB | List of PDB id codes 2MNG, 3OTF, 3U11, 4HBN, 4KL1, 4NVP |

Gene location (Human)
| Chr. | Chromosome 15 (human) |
| Band | 15q24.1 | Start | 73,319,859 bp |
| Band | 15q24.1 | End | 73,368,958 bp |

Gene location (Mouse)
| Chr. | Chromosome 9 (mouse) |
| Band | 9|9 B | Start | 58,730,695 bp |
| Band | 9|9 B | End | 58,770,458 bp |
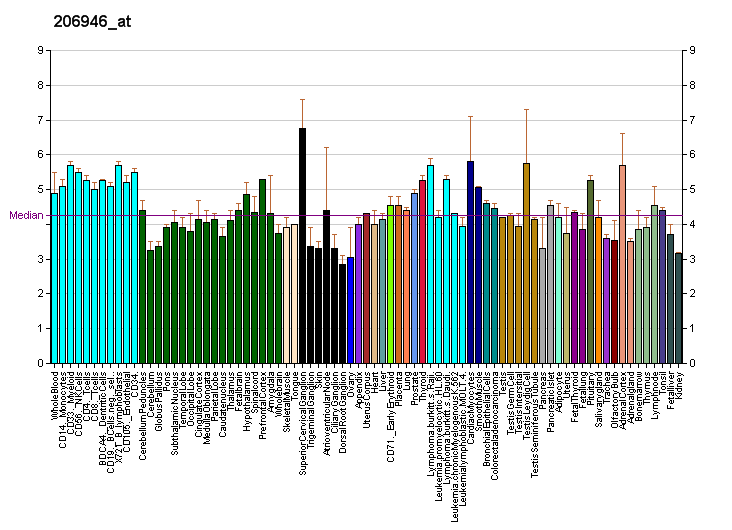
RNA expression pattern
| Bgee | Human / Mouse (ortholog); Top expressed in: tibialis anterior muscle; right atrium; right auricle of heart; apex of heart; testicle; left ventricle; secondary oocyte; right ventricle; gonad; mucosa of ileum / Top expressed in: myocardium; cardiac muscles; Cardiac muscle tissue of myocardium; electrical conduction system of the heart; sinus venosus; right atrium; sinoatrial node; septum transversum; vein; left horn of sinus venosus; More reference expression data |
| BioGPS | More reference expression data |
Gene ontology
| Molecular function | nucleotide binding; potassium channel activity; cAMP binding; sodium channel activity; voltage-gated ion channel activity; ion channel activity; intracellular cAMP-activated cation channel activity; identical protein binding; voltage-gated potassium channel activity; voltage-gated sodium channel activity; voltage-gated potassium channel activity involved in SA node cell action potential depolarization |
| Cellular component | integral component of membrane; membrane; intrinsic component of plasma membrane; plasma membrane; perinuclear region of cytoplasm; HCN channel complex |
| Biological process | cellular response to cGMP; muscle contraction; sodium ion transmembrane transport; sodium ion transport; SA node cell action potential; regulation of membrane potential; regulation of ion transmembrane transport; cation transport; ion transport; blood circulation; regulation of membrane depolarization; regulation of heart rate; potassium ion transport; transmembrane transport; potassium ion transmembrane transport; regulation of cardiac muscle contraction; regulation of heart rate by cardiac conduction; cellular response to cAMP; membrane depolarization during cardiac muscle cell action potential; membrane depolarization during SA node cell action potential; sodium ion import across plasma membrane; regulation of cardiac muscle cell action potential involved in regulation of contraction; potassium ion import across plasma membrane |
Sources:Amigo / QuickGO
Orthologs
| Databases | NCBI: entry; OMA: entry |
| Species | Human | Mouse |
| Entrez | 10021 | 330953 |
| Ensembl | ENSG00000138622 | ENSMUSG00000032338 |
| UniProt | Q9Y3Q4 | O70507 |
| RefSeq (mRNA) | NM_005477 | NM_001081192 |
| RefSeq (protein) | NP_005468 | NP_001074661 |
| Location (UCSC) | Chr 15: 73.32 – 73.37 Mb | Chr 9: 58.73 – 58.77 Mb |
| PubMed search |
- Wikidata
| View/Edit Human | View/Edit Mouse |

Potassium/sodium hyperpolarization-activated cyclic nucleotide-gated channel 4 is a protein that in humans is encoded by the HCN4 gene.

There are four HCN channels. HCN4 is prominently expressed in the pace maker region of the mammalian heart. Some humans with bradycardia and Sick sinus syndrome have been shown to have mutations in their HCN4 gene. The role of HCN channels in autonomic control of heart rate is currently a matter of ongoing investigation.

== Interactions ==
HCN4 has been shown to interact with HCN2.

== See also ==
- Cyclic nucleotide-gated ion channel
- Funny current
