= HCN2 =

Protein-coding gene in the species Homo sapiens

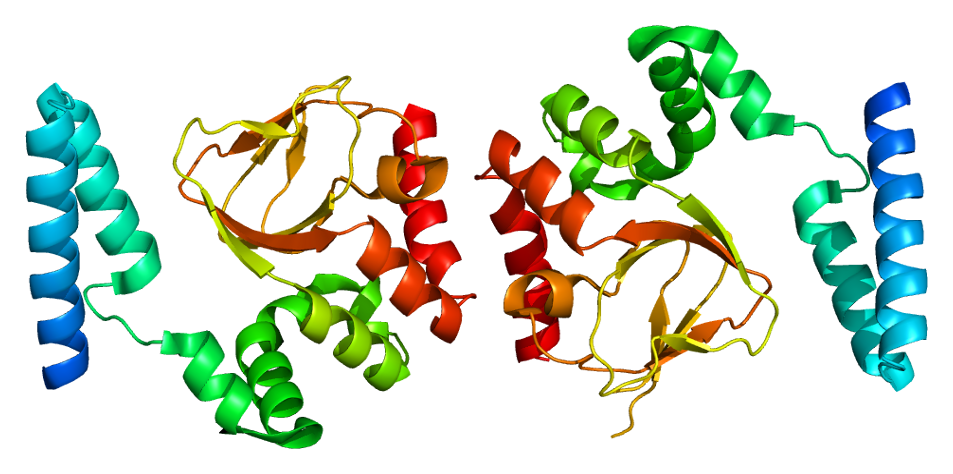

Identifiers
- Aliases: HCN2, BCNG-2, BCNG2, HAC-1, hyperpolarization activated cyclic nucleotide gated potassium channel 2, hyperpolarization activated cyclic nucleotide gated potassium and sodium channel 2, EIG17, FEB2, GEFSP11
- External IDs: OMIM: 602781; MGI: 1298210; GeneCards: HCN2
Available structures
| PDB | Ortholog search: PDBe RCSB |
| PDB | List of PDB id codes 2MPF, 3U10 |

Gene location (Human)
| Chr. | Chromosome 19 (human) |
| Band | 19p13.3 | Start | 589,881 bp |
| Band | 19p13.3 | End | 617,159 bp |

Gene location (Mouse)
| Chr. | Chromosome 10 (mouse) |
| Band | 10|10 C1 | Start | 79,552,468 bp |
| Band | 10|10 C1 | End | 79,571,942 bp |
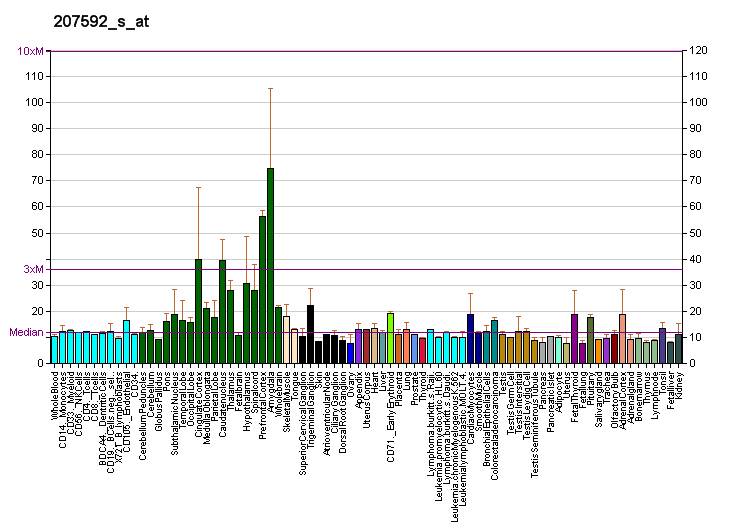

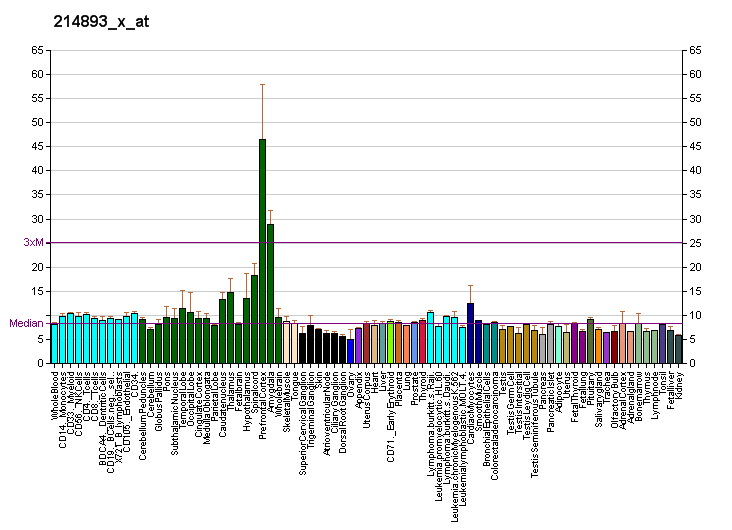
RNA expression pattern
| Bgee | Human / Mouse (ortholog); Top expressed in: C1 segment; right frontal lobe; putamen; nucleus accumbens; anterior cingulate cortex; caudate nucleus; Brodmann area 10; Brodmann area 9; amygdala; right hemisphere of cerebellum / Top expressed in: perirhinal cortex; entorhinal cortex; primary visual cortex; superior frontal gyrus; CA3 field; choroid plexus of fourth ventricle; central gray substance of midbrain; cerebellar cortex; medulla oblongata; lumbar subsegment of spinal cord; More reference expression data |
| BioGPS | More reference expression data |
Gene ontology
| Molecular function | nucleotide binding; potassium channel activity; cAMP binding; sodium channel activity; voltage-gated ion channel activity; ion channel activity; intracellular cAMP-activated cation channel activity; identical protein binding; voltage-gated potassium channel activity; voltage-gated sodium channel activity; protein binding |
| Cellular component | integral component of membrane; membrane; voltage-gated potassium channel complex; plasma membrane; integral component of plasma membrane; HCN channel complex |
| Biological process | cellular response to cGMP; sodium ion transmembrane transport; sodium ion transport; cell-cell signaling; regulation of membrane potential; regulation of ion transmembrane transport; ion transport; potassium ion transport; transmembrane transport; potassium ion transmembrane transport; cellular response to cAMP; membrane depolarization during cardiac muscle cell action potential; sodium ion import across plasma membrane; potassium ion import across plasma membrane |
Sources:Amigo / QuickGO
Orthologs
| Databases | NCBI: entry; OMA: entry |
| Species | Human | Mouse |
| Entrez | 610 | 15166 |
| Ensembl | ENSG00000099822 | ENSMUSG00000020331 |
| UniProt | Q9UL51 | O88703 |
| RefSeq (mRNA) | NM_001194 | NM_008226 |
| RefSeq (protein) | NP_001185 | NP_032252 |
| Location (UCSC) | Chr 19: 0.59 – 0.62 Mb | Chr 10: 79.55 – 79.57 Mb |
| PubMed search |
- Wikidata
| View/Edit Human | View/Edit Mouse |

Potassium/sodium hyperpolarization-activated cyclic nucleotide-gated ion channel 2 is a protein that in humans is encoded by the HCN2 gene.

== Interactions ==
HCN2 has been shown to interact with HCN1 and HCN4.

== Function ==
The function of the channel is not known although its activation by hyperpolarization alludes to the funny channels in the sinoatrial node of the heart (which form the basis of spontaneous generation of electrical rhythm). These channels have recently been associated with chronic pain and blocking the gene is associated with resolution of neuropathic episodes of pain.

== See also ==
- Cyclic nucleotide-gated ion channel
