= HCN3 =

Protein-coding gene in humans

Identifiers
- Aliases: HCN3, hyperpolarization activated cyclic nucleotide gated potassium channel 3
- External IDs: OMIM: 609973; MGI: 1298211; GeneCards: HCN3

Gene location (Human)
| Chr. | Chromosome 1 (human) |
| Band | 1q22 | Start | 155,277,463 bp |
| Band | 1q22 | End | 155,289,848 bp |

Gene location (Mouse)
| Chr. | Chromosome 3 (mouse) |
| Band | 3|3 F1 | Start | 89,053,381 bp |
| Band | 3|3 F1 | End | 89,067,503 bp |
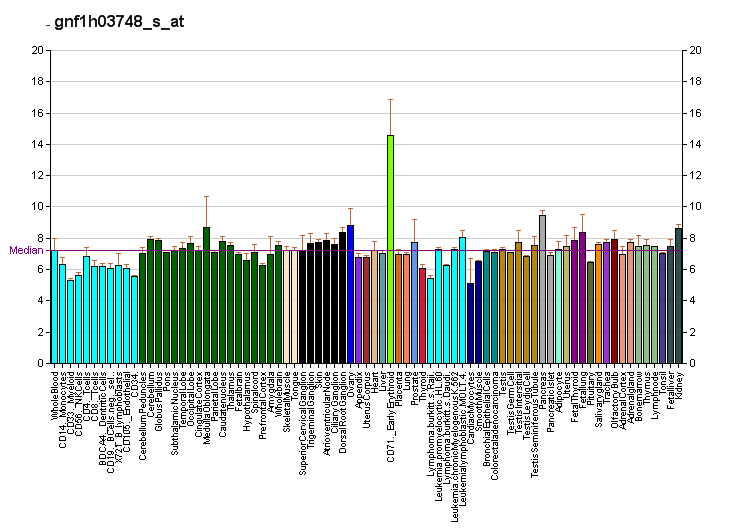
RNA expression pattern
| Bgee | Human / Mouse (ortholog); Top expressed in: right hemisphere of cerebellum; testicle; ganglionic eminence; mucosa of transverse colon; ventricular zone; pituitary gland; anterior pituitary; hypothalamus; superior frontal gyrus; right frontal lobe / Top expressed in: neural layer of retina; perirhinal cortex; entorhinal cortex; pineal gland; barrel cortex; CA3 field; spinal ganglia; glossopharyngeal ganglion; olfactory bulb; choroid plexus of fourth ventricle; More reference expression data |
| BioGPS | More reference expression data |
Gene ontology
| Molecular function | nucleotide binding; potassium channel activity; cAMP binding; sodium channel activity; voltage-gated ion channel activity; ion channel activity; voltage-gated potassium channel activity; voltage-gated sodium channel activity; protein binding |
| Cellular component | integral component of membrane; membrane; plasma membrane; synapse; soma; axon; dendrite; cone cell pedicle; integral component of plasma membrane |
| Biological process | sodium ion transmembrane transport; sodium ion transport; cellular response to dopamine; regulation of membrane potential; regulation of ion transmembrane transport; ion transport; potassium ion transport; response to cisplatin; transmembrane transport; potassium ion transmembrane transport; cellular response to cAMP |
Sources:Amigo / QuickGO
Orthologs
| Databases | NCBI: entry; OMA: entry |
| Species | Human | Mouse |
| Entrez | 57657 | 15168 |
| Ensembl | ENSG00000143630; ENSG00000263324 | ENSMUSG00000028051 |
| UniProt | Q9P1Z3 | O88705 |
| RefSeq (mRNA) | NM_020897 | NM_008227 |
| RefSeq (protein) | NP_065948 | NP_032253 |
| Location (UCSC) | Chr 1: 155.28 – 155.29 Mb | Chr 3: 89.05 – 89.07 Mb |
| PubMed search |
- Wikidata
| View/Edit Human | View/Edit Mouse |

Potassium/sodium hyperpolarization-activated cyclic nucleotide-gated channel 3 is a protein that in humans is encoded by the HCN3 gene.

== See also ==
- Cyclic nucleotide–gated ion channel
