= CNGB1 =

Protein-coding gene in the species Homo sapiens

Identifiers
- Aliases: CNGB1, CNCG2, CNCG3L, CNCG4, CNG4, CNGB1B, GAR1, GARP, GARP2, RCNC2, RCNCb, RCNCbeta, RP45, cyclic nucleotide gated channel beta 1, cyclic nucleotide gated channel subunit beta 1
- External IDs: OMIM: 600724; GeneCards: CNGB1

Gene location (Human)
Chr.	Chromosome 16 (human)
Band	16q21	Start	57,882,340 bp
Band	16q21	End	57,971,128 bp
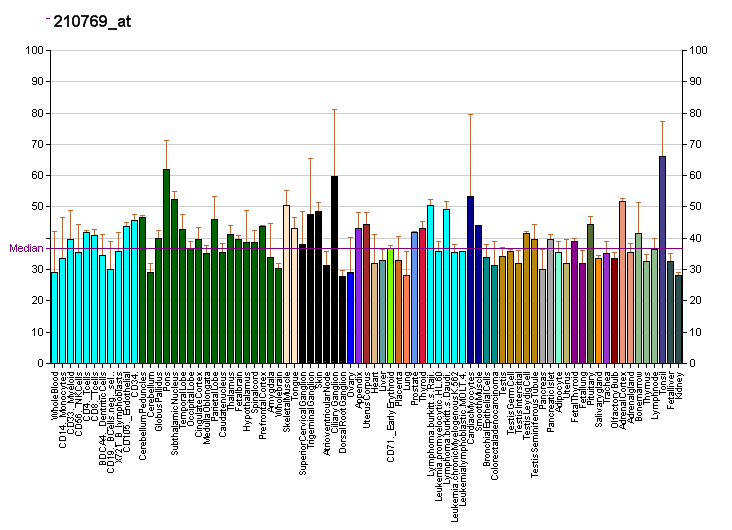

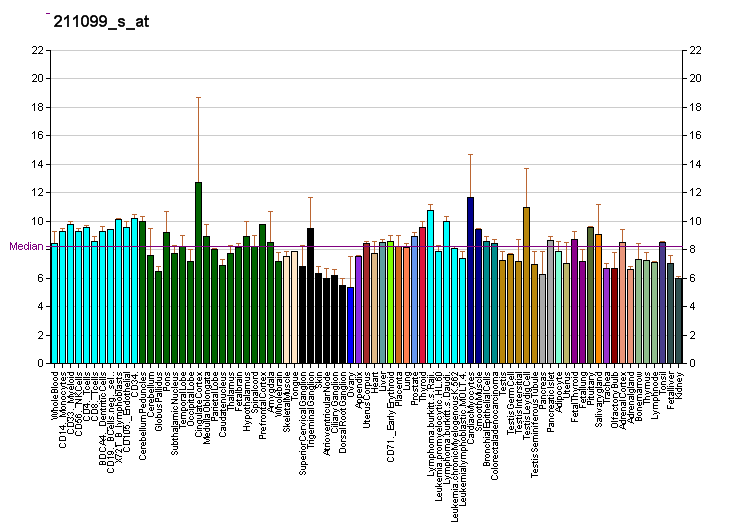

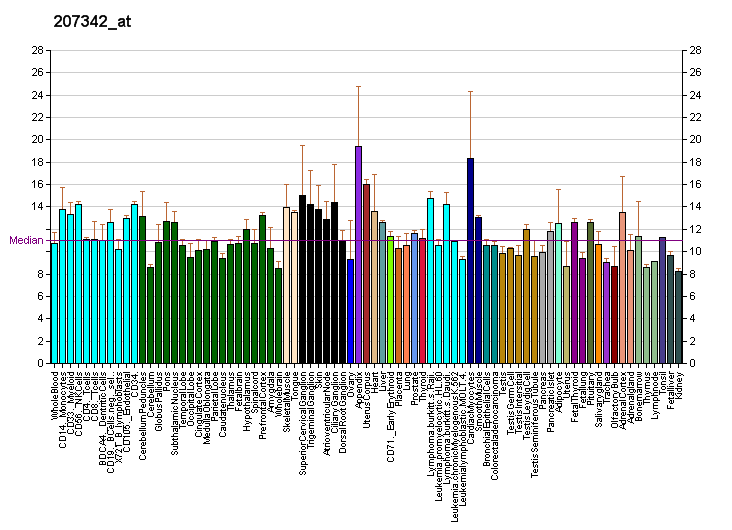
RNA expression pattern
Bgee	Human / Mouse (ortholog); Top expressed in: buccal mucosa cell; Epithelium of choroid plexus; testicle; retinal pigment epithelium; hypothalamus; cingulate gyrus; anterior cingulate cortex; lateral nuclear group of thalamus; entorhinal cortex; dorsolateral prefrontal cortex / n/a; More reference expression data
BioGPS	More reference expression data
Gene ontology
Molecular function	nucleotide binding; intracellular cyclic nucleotide activated cation channel activity; cyclic nucleotide-gated ion channel activity; cAMP binding; cGMP binding; protein binding; ligand-gated ion channel activity; voltage-gated potassium channel activity; intracellular cGMP-activated cation channel activity; intracellular cAMP-activated cation channel activity
Cellular component	integral component of membrane; membrane; Golgi membrane; photoreceptor outer segment; ciliary membrane; Golgi-associated vesicle membrane; transmembrane transporter complex; terminal bouton; intracellular cyclic nucleotide activated cation channel complex; plasma membrane; integral component of plasma membrane
Biological process	protein localization to organelle; response to stimulus; regulation of rhodopsin mediated signaling pathway; regulation of membrane potential; cation transport; ion transport; photoreceptor cell outer segment organization; cation transmembrane transport; detection of light stimulus involved in visual perception; sensory perception of smell; retina homeostasis; photoreceptor cell maintenance; visual perception; rhodopsin mediated signaling pathway; phototransduction; regulation of cytosolic calcium ion concentration; potassium ion transmembrane transport; protein heterotetramerization
Sources:Amigo / QuickGO
Orthologs
Databases	NCBI: entry; OMA: entry
Species	Human	Mouse
Entrez	1258	n/a
Ensembl	ENSG00000070729	n/a
UniProt	Q14028	n/a
RefSeq (mRNA)	NM_001135639; NM_001286130; NM_001297	n/a
RefSeq (protein)	NP_001129111; NP_001273059; NP_001288	n/a
Location (UCSC)	Chr 16: 57.88 – 57.97 Mb	n/a
PubMed search		n/a
- Wikidata
View/Edit Human

Cyclic nucleotide gated channel beta 1, also known as CNGB1, is a human gene encoding an ion channel protein.

== See also ==
- Cyclic nucleotide-gated ion channel
