= Michael Eisenbach =

Israeli biochemist

- מיכאל אייזנבך
- Born: April 10, 1945; Tel Aviv, Israel
- Citizenship: Israel
- Education: Ph.D., Tel Aviv University, 1975
- Known for: Opening the field of mammalian sperm navigation, discovering mammalian sperm chemotaxis and thermotaxis, contributing to understanding of the molecular mechanism of bacterial chemotaxis
- Scientific career
- Fields: Biochemistry
- Workplaces: Weizmann Institute of Science
- Website: www.weizmann.ac.il/Biomolecular_Sciences/Eisenbach/

Michael Eisenbach (Hebrew: מיכאל אייזנבך) is an Israeli biochemist who specializes in the navigation mechanisms of bacterial and sperm cells. He is a professor emeritus at the Weizmann Institute of Science, Department of Biomolecular Sciences, Rehovot, Israel. He discovered that sperm cells (spermatozoa) of mammals are actively guided to the egg. This opened the research field of mammalian sperm navigation (also termed sperm guidance).

== Early life ==
Eisenbach was born in Tel Aviv, Israel on 10 April 1945. His parents, Menachem (Mendel; 1906–1976) and Haya (Helena Leibler; 1910–1993) Eisenbach, were born in Poland and immigrated to Israel at the end of 1934. Most of their family members remained in Poland and were exterminated in the Holocaust.

Michael Eisenbach grew up in Tel Aviv and studied in an evening high school while working during the daytime as a messenger boy (first for the Tel Aviv-Yafo Municipality and then for the Dubek company). He served his compulsory military term in the Israel Defense Forces in 1963–1966.

== Education ==
Eisenbach attended Tel Aviv University. He received his B.Sc. in chemistry (1969), M.Sc. (with distinction, 1971) and Ph.D. in biochemistry (1975). For his M.Sc., he studied, under the supervision of Chanoch Carmeli, the photosynthetic electron transport chain in chloroplasts. For his Ph.D., he studied, under the supervision of Menachem (Hemi) Gutman, the respiratory electron transport chain in mitochondria.

He then moved to the Weizmann Institute of Science for postdoctoral study under the supervision of S. Roy Caplan, where he investigated the proton pump activity of bacteriorhodopsin in the purple membrane of archaea (1975–1978).

He did a second postdoctoral fellowship in Madison, Wisconsin, USA where he studied bacterial chemotaxis under the supervision of Julius Adler (1978–1980).

== Academic career ==
In 1980, Eisenbach returned to the Weizmann Institute as a senior scientist (equivalent to assistant professor) and established his own research group as an independent investigator. Four years later he was promoted to associate professor with tenure, and in 1995 to professor. In 2015, he became a professor emeritus.

Eisenbach has held academic and leadership positions throughout his career, particularly within the Weizmann Institute of Science and in various national and international scientific organizations.

== Research ==
=== Research on Sperm Navigation in Mammals ===
In the early 1990s, Eisenbach pioneered the study of mammalian sperm navigation, challenging the prevailing belief that such navigation was unnecessary due to the high number of spermatozoa in the female reproductive tract.

Eisenbach's group first showed that human spermatozoa accumulate in diluted follicular fluid, correlating with the fertilization potential of the corresponding egg.

They identified this accumulation as chemotaxis, defined criteria to distinguish it from other processes, and found that only capacitated spermatozoa (~10% in humans) are chemotactically responsive.

They discovered that the capacitated state in human spermatozoa is transient, lasting between 50 and 240 minutes in vitro. They found that within the sperm population, capacitated cells are continuously replaced, and that spermatozoa which are no longer capacitated are subsequently phagocytized by macrophages.

His team provided evidence that chemoattractants are secreted by the egg and surrounding cumulus cells post-ovulation.

Recognizing the short-range nature of chemotaxis, Eisenbach's research team discovered sperm thermotaxis as an additional, long-range navigation mechanism. They demonstrated that capacitated spermatozoa in humans, rabbits, and mice are capable of detecting and responding to temperature gradients comparable to, and even shallower than, those present in the oviduct during ovulation.

They identified opsins as thermosensors for sperm thermotaxis and elucidated two signaling pathways: one via rhodopsin and cyclic nucleotides, and another via melanopsin and phospholipase C.

Eisenbach linked hyperactivation (a vigorous motility pattern characterized by large amplitudes of head displacement) to both sperm chemotaxis and thermotaxis. His research demonstrated that sperm cells adjust their turning frequency and hyperactivation events in response to chemical and thermal gradients, thereby elucidating the behavioral mechanisms underlying human sperm chemotaxis and thermotaxis.

Eisenbach proposed that sperm navigation not only guides sperm cells to the egg but also serves as a selection mechanism for capacitated spermatozoa, with potential implications for assisted reproduction.

In 2004, a startup company named Repromed was established to explore the use of thermotaxis to improve the success rate of artificial insemination. Although the company closed due to lack of funding before reaching the clinical trial stage, subsequent studies by other research groups later validated the concept.

=== Research on Bacterial Chemotaxis ===
Prior to and alongside his work on sperm navigation, Eisenbach conducted extensive research into the molecular mechanisms of chemotaxis in bacteria, particularly Escherichia coli and Salmonella. These organisms served as model systems for studying behavior at the molecular level. His group made significant contributions to understanding how bacteria regulate flagellar rotation in response to chemical gradients.

Key findings include:

- The bacterial flagellar motor has a default rotation direction, which is reversed upon binding of the signal protein CheY to the switch complex.
- CheY primarily binds to the N-terminus of the switch protein FliM. Phosphorylation of CheY enhances the interaction and promotes reversal of motor rotation.
- CheY's activity is also modulated by acetylation, which plays a critical role in motor switching. In addition, Eisenbach's group elucidated the molecular mechanism underlying CheY acetylation.
- The team also revealed the molecular events that occur at the switch complex following CheY–FliM binding.
- Additionally, they identified fumarate as a switching factor, demonstrating its interaction with fumarate reductase and the switch protein FliG to induce directional changes in flagellar rotation.

== Personal life ==
Eisenbach married Lea Eisenbach (née Abarbanel) in 1967, divorced in 1985, and married Michal Schwartz (née Hevrony) in 1991. He has three sons.

Eisenbach started learning to play the clarinet at the age of 70. In 2021, he became a member of the Maskit Clarinet Choir and in 2023 a clarinet player in the Orchestra of the Weizmann Institute of Science.

== Selected publications ==
=== Books ===
- Eisenbach, Michael (2004). Chemotaxis. orld Scientific Publishing Company. p. 516. ISBN 978-1-911299-01-1.
- Eisenbach, Michael, ed. (1985). Sensing and response in microorganisms: papers of ... 13. Aharon Katzir-Katchalsky Conference on Sensing and Response in Microorganisms held in Israel at the Weizmann Inst. of Science, Rehovot, and in Kibbuz Ayelet Hashahar, March 17 - 22, 1985. Amsterdam: Elsevier. ISBN 978-0-444-80758-8.

=== Journals ===
- Ravid, S; Matsumura, P; Eisenbach, M (October 1986). "Restoration of flagellar clockwise rotation in bacterial envelopes by insertion of the chemotaxis protein CheY". Proceedings of the National Academy of Sciences. 83 (19): 7157–7161. Bibcode:1986PNAS...83.7157R. doi:10.1073/pnas.83.19.7157. ISSN 0027-8424. PMC 386674. PMID 3532103.
- Ralt, D; Goldenberg, M; Fetterolf, P; Thompson, D; Dor, J; Mashiach, S; Garbers, D L; Eisenbach, M (April 1991). "Sperm attraction to a follicular factor(s) correlates with human egg fertilizability". Proceedings of the National Academy of Sciences. 88 (7): 2840–2844. Bibcode:1991PNAS...88.2840R. doi:10.1073/pnas.88.7.2840. ISSN 0027-8424. PMC 51335. PMID 2011591.
- Barak, R; Eisenbach, M (1992). "Fumarate or a fumarate metabolite restores switching ability to rotating flagella of bacterial envelopes". Journal of Bacteriology. 174 (2): 643–645. doi:10.1128/jb.174.2.643-645.1992. ISSN 0021-9193. PMC 205763. PMID 1729255.
- Welch, M; Oosawa, K; Aizawa, S; Eisenbach, M (1993). "Phosphorylation-dependent binding of a signal molecule to the flagellar switch of bacteria". Proceedings of the National Academy of Sciences. 90 (19): 8787–8791. Bibcode:1993PNAS...90.8787W. doi:10.1073/pnas.90.19.8787. ISSN 0027-8424. PMC 47445. PMID 8415608.
- Blat, Yuval; Eisenbach, Michael (1994-02-01). "Phosphorylation-dependent binding of the chemotaxis signal molecule CheY to its phosphatase, CheZ". Biochemistry. 33 (4): 902–906. doi:10.1021/bi00170a008. ISSN 0006-2960. PMID 8305438.
- Ralt, Dina; Manor, Mira; Cohen-Dayag, Anat; Tur-Kaspa, Ilan; Ben-Shlomo, Izhar; Makler, Amnon; Yuli, Izhak; Dor, Jehoshua; Blumberg, Shmaryahu; Mashiach, Shlomo; Eisenbach, Michael (1994-04-01). "Chemotaxis and Chemokinesis of Human Spermatozoa to Follicular Factors1". Biology of Reproduction. 50 (4): 774–785. doi:10.1095/biolreprod50.4.774. ISSN 0006-3363. PMID 8199258.
- Cohen-Dayag, Anat; Ralt, Dina; Tur-Kaspa, Ilan; Manor, Mira; Makler, Amnon; Dor, Jehoshua; Mashiach, Shlomo; Eisenbach, Michael (1994-04-01). "Sequential Acquisition of Chemotactic Responsiveness by Human Spermatozoa1". Biology of Reproduction. 50 (4): 786–790. doi:10.1095/biolreprod50.4.786. ISSN 0006-3363. PMID 8199259.
- Cohen-Dayag, A; Tur-Kaspa, I; Dor, J; Mashiach, S; Eisenbach, M (1995-11-21). "Sperm capacitation in humans is transient and correlates with chemotactic responsiveness to follicular factors". Proceedings of the National Academy of Sciences. 92 (24): 11039–11043. Bibcode:1995PNAS...9211039C. doi:10.1073/pnas.92.24.11039. ISSN 0027-8424. PMC 40566. PMID 7479932.
- Bren, A; Welch, M; Blat, Y; Eisenbach, M (1996-09-17). "Signal termination in bacterial chemotaxis: CheZ mediates dephosphorylation of free rather than switch-bound CheY". Proceedings of the National Academy of Sciences. 93 (19): 10090–10093. Bibcode:1996PNAS...9310090B. doi:10.1073/pnas.93.19.10090. ISSN 0027-8424. PMC 38341. PMID 8816756.
- Barak, Rina; Eisenbach, Michael (May 2001). "Acetylation of the response regulator, CheY, is involved in bacterial chemotaxis". Molecular Microbiology. 40 (3): 731–743. doi:10.1046/j.1365-2958.2001.02425.x. ISSN 0950-382X. PMID 11359578.
- Bahat, Anat; Tur-Kaspa, Ilan; Gakamsky, Anna; Giojalas, Laura C.; Breitbart, Haim; Eisenbach, Michael (February 2003). "Thermotaxis of mammalian sperm cells: A potential navigation mechanism in the female genital tract". Nature Medicine. 9 (2): 149–150. doi:10.1038/nm0203-149. hdl:11336/66658. ISSN 1078-8956. PMID 12563318.
