= Sperm guidance =

Biological process

Sperm guidance is the process by which sperm cells (spermatozoa) are directed to the oocyte (egg) for the aim of fertilization. In the case of marine invertebrates the guidance is done by chemotaxis. In the case of mammals, it appears to be done by chemotaxis, thermotaxis and rheotaxis.

== Background ==
Since the discovery of sperm attraction to the female gametes in ferns over a century ago, sperm guidance in the form of sperm chemotaxis has been established in a large variety of species Although sperm chemotaxis is prevalent throughout the Metazoa kingdom, from marine species with external fertilization such as sea urchins and corals, to humans, much of the current information on sperm chemotaxis is derived from studies of marine invertebrates, primarily sea urchin and starfish. As a matter of fact, until not too long ago, the dogma was that, in mammals, guidance of spermatozoa to the oocyte was unnecessary. This was due to the common belief that, following ejaculation into the female genital tract, large numbers of spermatozoa 'race' towards the oocyte and compete to fertilize it to make an embryo. This belief was taken apart when it became clear that only few of the ejaculated spermatozoa — in humans, only ~1 of every million spermatozoa — succeed in entering the oviducts (fallopian tubes) and when more recent studies showed that mammalian spermatozoa employ at least three different mechanisms, each of which can potentially serve as a guidance mechanism: chemotaxis, thermotaxis and rheotaxis.

== Sperm guidance in non-mammalian species ==
Sperm guidance in non-mammalian species is performed by chemotaxis. The oocyte secretes a chemoattractant, which, as it diffuses away, forms a concentration gradient: a high concentration close to the egg, and a gradually lower concentration as the distance from the oocyte increases. Spermatozoa can sense this chemoattractant and orient their swimming direction up the concentration gradient towards the oocyte. Sperm chemotaxis was demonstrated in a large number of non-mammalian species, from marine invertebrates to frogs.

=== Chemoattractants ===
The sperm chemoattractants in non-mammalian species vary to a large extent. Some examples are shown in Table 1. So far, most sperm chemoattractants that have been identified in non-mammalian species are peptides or low-molecular-weight proteins (1–20 kDa), which are heat stable and sensitive to proteases. Exceptions to this rule are the sperm chemoattractants of corals, ascidians, plants such as ferns, and algae (Table 1).

=== Table 1. Some sperm chemoattractants in non-mammalian species* ===
Species	Chemoattractant	References
Algae	Low-molecular-weight unsaturated pheromones of cyclic or linear structure (for example 532 Da pentosylated hydroquinone in the case of Chlamydomonas allensworthii)	
Amphibians	Allurin — a 21 kDa protein (for Xenopus)	
Ascidians	SAAF — a sulfated steroid: 3,4,7,26-tetrahydroxycholestane-3,26-disulfate (for Ciona savignyi and intestinalis)	
Corals	A lipid-like long chain fatty alcohol CH_{3}-(CH_{2})_{8}-CH=CH-CH=CH-CH_{2}OH (for Montipora digitata)	
Ferns	Dicarboxylic acids, for example malic acid in its partially ionized form (for Pteridium aquilinum)	
Mollusks	SepSAP — a 6-residue peptide-amide with the sequence PIDPGV-CONH2 (for Sepia officinalis)	
Sea urchins	Resact — a 14-residue peptide with the sequence CVTGAPGCVGGGRL-NH2 (for Arbacia punctulata)	
Starfish	Startrak — a 13 kDa heat-stable protein (for Pycnopodia helianthoides)	

- Taken from reference.

=== Species specificity ===
The variety of chemoattractants raises the question of species specificity with respect to the chemoattractant identity. There is no single rule for chemoattractant-related specificity. Thus, in some groups of marine invertebrates (e.g., hydromedusae and certain ophiuroids), the specificity is very high; in others (e.g., starfish), the specificity is at the family level and, within the family, there is no specificity. In mollusks, there appears to be no specificity at all. Likewise, in plants, a unique simple compound [e.g., fucoserratene — a linear, unsaturated alkene (1,3-trans 5-cis-octatriene)] might be a chemoattractant for various species.

=== Behavioral mechanism ===
Here, too, there is no single rule. In some species (for example, in hydroids like Campanularia or tunicate like Ciona), the swimming direction of the spermatozoa changes abruptly towards the chemoattractant source. In others (for example, in sea urchin, hydromedusa, fern, or fish such as Japanese bitterlings), the approach to the chemoattractant source is indirect and the movement is by repetitive loops of small radii. In some species (for example, herring or the ascidian Ciona) activation of motility precedes chemotaxis. In chemotaxis, cells may either sense a temporal gradient of the chemoattractant, comparing the occupancy of its receptors at different time points (as do bacteria), or they may detect a spatial gradient, comparing the occupancy of receptors at different locations along the cell (as do leukocytes). In the best-studied species, sea urchin, the spermatozoa sense a temporal gradient and respond to it with a transient increase in flagellar asymmetry. The outcome is a turn in the swimming path, followed by a period of straight swimming, leading to the observed epicycloid-like movements directed towards the chemoattractant source.

=== Molecular mechanism ===
The molecular mechanism of sperm chemotaxis is still not fully known. The current knowledge is mainly based on studies in the sea urchin Arbacia punctulata, where binding of the chemoattractant resact (Table 1) to its receptor, a guanylyl cyclase, activates cGMP synthesis (Figure 1). The resulting rise of cGMP possibly activates K^{+}-selective ion channels. The consequential hyperpolarization activates hyperpolarization-activated and cyclic nucleotide-gated (HCN) channels. The depolarizing inward current through HCN channels possibly activates voltage-activated Ca^{2+} channels, resulting in elevation of intracellular Ca^{2+}. This rise leads to flagellar asymmetry and, consequently, a turn of the sperm cell.

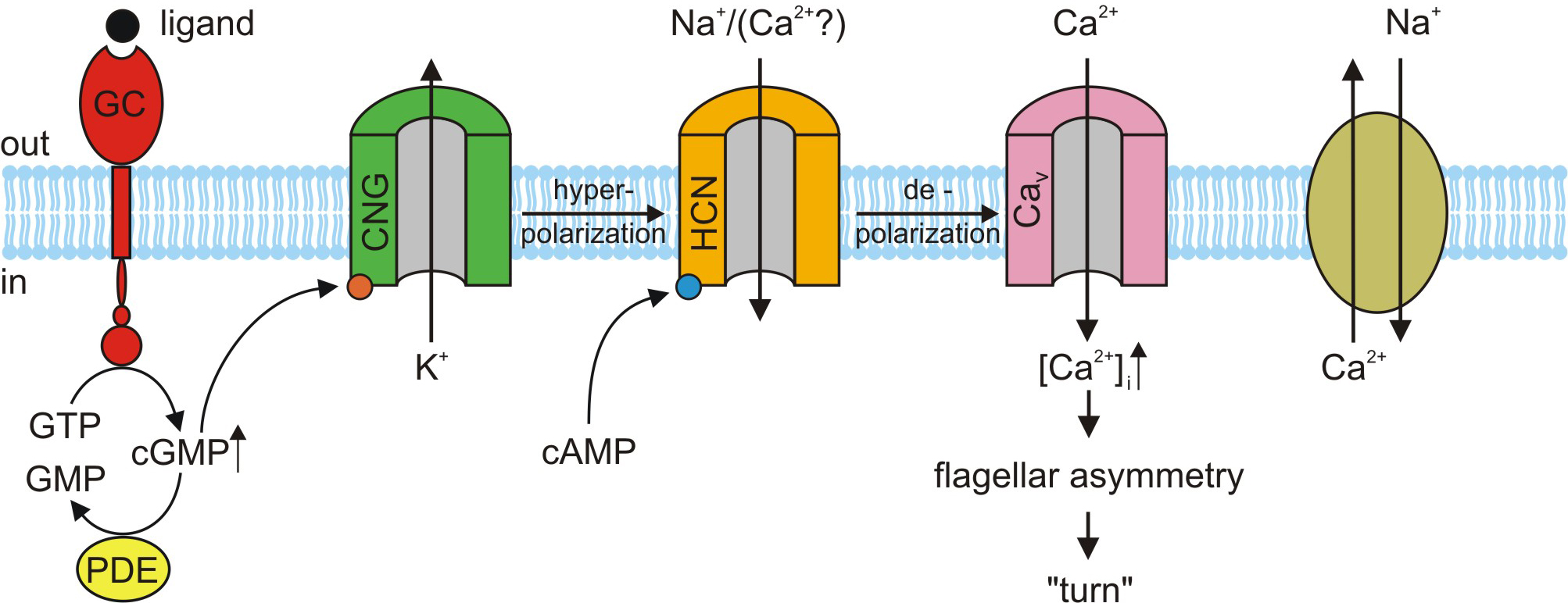

Figure 1. A model of the signal-transduction pathway during sperm chemotaxis of the sea urchin Arbacia punctulata. Binding of a chemoattractant (ligand) to the receptor — a membrane-bound guanylyl cyclase (GC) — activates the synthesis of cGMP from GTP. Cyclic GMP possibly opens cyclic nucleotide-gated (CNG) K^{+}-selective channels, thereby causing hyperpolarization of the membrane. The cGMP signal is terminated by the hydrolysis of cGMP through phosphodiesterase (PDE) activity and inactivation of GC. On hyperpolarization, hyperpolarization-activated and cyclic nucleotide-gated (HCN) channels allow the influx of Na^{+} that leads to depolarization and thereby causes a rapid Ca^{2+} entry through voltage-activated Ca^{2+} channels (Ca_{v}), Ca^{2+} ions interact by unknown mechanisms with the axoneme of the flagellum and cause an increase of the asymmetry of flagellar beat and eventually a turn or bend in the swimming trajectory. Ca^{2+} is removed from the flagellum by a Na^{+}/Ca^{2+} exchange mechanism. [Taken from ref.]

== Sperm guidance in mammals ==
Three different guidance mechanisms have been proposed to occur in the mammalian oviduct: thermotaxis, rheotaxis, and chemotaxis. Indeed, due to obvious restrictions, all these mechanisms were demonstrated in vitro only. However, the discoveries of proper stimuli in the female – an ovulation-dependent temperature gradient in the oviduct, post-coitus oviductal fluid flow in female mice, and sperm chemoattractants secreted from the oocyte and its surrounding cumulus cells, respectively – strongly suggest the mutual occurrence of these mechanisms in vivo.

=== I. Chemotaxis ===
Following the findings that human spermatozoa accumulate in follicular fluid and that there is a remarkable correlation between this in vitro accumulation and oocyte fertilization, chemotaxis was substantiated as the cause of this accumulation. Sperm chemotaxis was later also demonstrated in mice and rabbits. In addition, sperm accumulation in follicular fluid (but without substantiating that it truly reflects chemotaxis) was demonstrated in horses and pigs. A key feature of sperm chemotaxis in humans is that this process is restricted to capacitated cells — the only cells that possess the ability to penetrate the oocyte and fertilize it. This raised the possibility that, in mammals, chemotaxis is not solely a guidance mechanism but it is also a mechanism of sperm selection. Importantly, the fraction of capacitated (and, hence, chemotactically responsive) spermatozoa is low (~10% in humans), the life span of the capacitated/chemotactic state is short (1–4 hours in humans), a spermatozoon can be at this state only once in its lifetime, and sperm individuals become capacitated/chemotactic at different time points, resulting in continuous replacement of capacitated/chemotactic cells within the sperm population, i.e., prolonged availability of capacitated cells. These sperm features raised the possibility that prolonging the time period, during which capacitated spermatozoa can be found in the female genital tract, is a mechanism, evolved in humans, to compensate for the lack of coordination between insemination and ovulation.

Chemotaxis is a short-range guidance mechanism. As such, it can guide spermatozoa for short distances only, estimated at the order of millimeters.

==== Chemoattractants ====
In humans, there are at least two different origins of sperm chemoattractants. One is the cumulus cells that surround the oocyte, and the other is the mature oocyte itself. The chemoattractant secreted from the cumulus cells is the steroid progesterone, shown to be effective at the picomolar range. The chemoattractant secreted from the oocyte is even more potent. It is a hydrophobic non-peptide molecule which, when secreted from the oocyte, is in complex with a carrier protein Additional compounds have been shown to act as chemoattractants for mammalian spermatozoa. They include the chemokine CCL20, atrial natriuretic peptide (ANP), specific odorants, natriuretic peptide type C (NPPC), and allurin, to mention a few. It is reasonable to assume that not all of them are physiologically relevant.

==== Species specificity ====
Species specificity was not detected in experiments that compared the chemotactic responsiveness of human and rabbit spermatozoa to follicular fluids or egg-conditioned media obtained from human, bovine, and rabbit. The subsequent findings that cumulus cells of both human and rabbit (and, probably, of other mammals as well) secrete the chemoattractant progesterone is sufficient to account for the lack of specificity in the chemotactic response of mammalian spermatozoa.

==== Behavioral mechanism ====
Mammalian spermatozoa, like sea-urchin spermatozoa, appear to sense the chemoattractant gradient temporally (comparing receptor occupancy over time) rather than spatially (comparing receptor occupancy over space). This is because the establishment of a temporal gradient in the absence of spatial gradient, achieved by mixing human spermatozoa with a chemoattractant or by photorelease of a chemoattractant from its caged compound, results in delayed transient changes in swimming behavior that involve increased frequency of turns and hyperactivation events. On the basis of these observations and the finding that the level of hyperactivation events is reduced when chemotactically responsive spermatozoa swim in a spatial chemoattractant gradient it was proposed that turns and hyperactivation events are suppressed when capacitated spermatozoa swim up a chemoattractant gradient, and vice versa when they swim down a gradient. In other words, human spermatozoa approach chemoattractants by modulating the frequency of turns and hyperactivation events, similarly to Escherichia coli bacteria.

==== Molecular mechanism ====
As in non-mammalian species, the end signal in chemotaxis for changing the direction of swimming is Ca^{2+}. The discovery of progesterone as a chemoattractant led to the identification of its receptor on the sperm surface – CatSper, a Ca^{2+} channel present exclusively in the tail of mammalian spermatozoa. (Note, though, that progesterone only stimulates human CatSper but not mouse CatSper. Consistently, sperm chemotaxis to progesterone was not found in mice.) However, the molecular steps subsequent to CatSper activation by progesterone are obscure, though the involvement of trans-membrane adenylyl cyclase, cAMP and protein kinase A as well as soluble guanylyl cyclase, cGMP, inositol trisphosphate receptor and store-operated Ca^{2+} channel was proposed.

=== II. Thermotaxis ===
The realization that sperm chemotaxis can guide spermatozoa for short distances only, triggered a search for potential long-range guidance mechanisms. The findings that, at least in rabbits and pigs, a temperature difference exists within the oviduct, and that this temperature difference is established at ovulation in rabbits due to a temperature drop in the oviduct near the junction with the uterus, creating a temperature gradient between the sperm storage site and the fertilization site in the oviduct, led to a study of whether mammalian spermatozoa can respond to a temperature gradient by thermotaxis.

==== Establishing sperm thermotaxis as an active process ====
Mammalian sperm thermotaxis was, hitherto, demonstrated in three species: humans, rabbits, and mice. This was done by two methods. One involved a Zigmond chamber, modified to make the temperature in each well separately controllable and measurable. A linear temperature gradient was established between the wells and the swimming of spermatozoa in this gradient was analyzed. A small fraction of the spermatozoa (at the order of ~10%), shown to be the capacitated cells, biased their swimming direction according to the gradient, moving towards the warmer temperature. The other method involved two- or three-compartment separation tube placed within a thermoseparation device that maintains a linear temperature gradient. Sperm accumulation at the warmer end of the separation tube was much higher than the accumulation at the same temperature but in the absence of a temperature gradient. This gradient-dependent sperm accumulation was observed over a wide temperature range (29-41 °C). Since temperature affects almost every process, much attention has been devoted to the question of whether the measurements, mentioned just above, truly demonstrate thermotaxis or whether they reflect another temperature-dependent process. The most pronounced effect of temperature in liquid is convection, which raised the concern that the apparent thermotactic response could have been a reflection of a passive drift in the liquid current or a rheotactic response to the current (rather than to the temperature gradient per se). Another concern was that the temperature could have changed the local pH of the buffer solution in which the spermatozoa are suspended. This could generate a pH gradient along the temperature gradient, and the spermatozoa might have responded to the formed pH gradient by chemotaxis. However, careful experimental examinations of all these possibilities with proper controls demonstrated that the measured responses to temperature are true thermotactic responses and that they are not a reflection of any other temperature-sensitive process, including rheotaxis and chemotaxis.

==== Behavioral mechanism of mammalian sperm thermotaxis ====
The behavioral mechanism of sperm thermotaxis has been so far only investigated in human spermatozoa. Like the behavioral mechanisms of bacterial chemotaxis and human sperm chemotaxis, the behavioral mechanism of human sperm thermotaxis appears to be stochastic rather than deterministic. Capacitated human spermatozoa swim in rather straight lines interrupted by turns and brief episodes of hyperactivation. Each such episode results in swimming in a new direction. When the spermatozoa sense a decrease in temperature, the frequency of turns and hyperactivation events increases due to increased flagellar-wave amplitude that results in enhanced side-to-side head displacement. With time, this response undergoes partial adaptation. The opposite happens in response to an increase in temperature. This suggests that when capacitated spermatozoa swim up a temperature gradient, turns are repressed and the spermatozoa continue swimming in the gradient direction. When they happen to swim down the gradient, they turn again and again until their swimming direction is again up the gradient.

==== Temperature sensing ====
The response of spermatozoa to temporal temperature changes even when the temperature is kept constant spatially suggests that, as in the case of human sperm chemotaxis, sperm thermotaxis involves temporal gradient sensing. In other words, spermatozoa apparently compare the temperature (or a temperature-dependent function) between consecutive time points. This, however, does not exclude the occurrence of spatial temperature sensing in addition to temporal sensing. Human spermatozoa can respond thermotactically within a wide temperature range (at least 29–41 °C). Within this range they preferentially accumulate in warmer temperatures rather than at a single specific, preferred temperature. Amazingly, they can sense and thermotactically respond to temperature gradients as low as <0.014 °C/mm. This means that when human spermatozoa swim a distance that equals their body length (~46 μm) they respond to a temperature difference of <0.0006 °C!

==== Molecular mechanism ====
The molecular mechanism underlying thermotaxis, in general, and thermosensing with such extreme sensitivity, in particular, is obscure. It is known that, unlike other recognized thermosensors in mammals, the thermosensors for sperm thermotaxis do not seem to be temperature-sensitive ion channels. They are rather opsins, known to be G-protein-coupled receptors that act as photosensors in vision. The opsins are present in spermatozoa at specific sites, which depend on the species and the opsin type. They are involved in sperm thermotaxis via at least two signaling pathways: a phospholipase C signaling pathway and a cyclic-nucleotide pathway. The former was shown by pharmacological means in human spermatozoa to involve the enzyme phospholipase C, an inositol trisphosphate receptor located on internal calcium stores, the calcium channel TRPC3, and intracellular calcium. The cyclic-nucleotide pathway was, hitherto, shown to involve phosphodiesterase. Blocking both pathways fully inhibits sperm thermotaxis.

=== III. Rheotaxis ===
When human and mouse spermatozoa are exposed to a fluid flow, roughly one half of them (i.e., both capacitated and noncapacitated spermatozoa) reorient and swim against the current. The flow, which is prolactin-triggered oviductal fluid secretion, is generated in female mice within 4 h of sexual stimulation and coitus. Thus, rheotaxis orients spermatozoa towards the fertilization site. It was proposed that capacitated spermatozoa might detach from the oviductal surface faster than non-capacitated spermatozoa, enabling them to swim into the main current. To understand the mechanism of sperm turning in rheotaxis, quantitative analysis of human sperm flagellar behavior during rheotaxis turning was carried out. The results revealed, both at the single cell and population levels, that there is no significant difference in flagellar beating between rheotaxis turning spermatozoa and free-swimming spermatozoa. This finding taken together with the constant internal Ca^{2+} signal, measured during rheotaxis turning, demonstrated that, in contrast to the active process of chemotaxis and thermotaxis, human sperm rheotaxis is a passive process and no flow sensing is involved.

=== All mechanisms combined ===
Like in any other highly essential system in biology, mammalian sperm guidance is expected to involve redundancy. Indeed, at least three guidance mechanisms are likely to act in the female genital tract, two active mechanisms — chemotaxis and thermotaxis, and a passive mechanism — rheotaxis. When one of these mechanisms is not functional for any reason, guidance is not expected to be lost and the cells should still be able to navigate to the oocyte. This resembles guidance of migrating birds, where the birds' navigation is unaffected when one of the guidance mechanisms is not functional. It has been suggested that capacitated spermatozoa, released from the sperm storage site at the isthmus, may be first actively guided by thermotaxis from the cooler sperm storage site towards the warmer fertilization site (Figure 2). Two passive processes, rheotaxis and contractions of the oviduct may assist the spermatozoa to reach there. At this location, the spermatozoa may be chemotactically guided to the oocyte-cumulus complex by the gradient of progesterone, secreted from the cumulus cells. In addition, progesterone may inwardly guide spermatozoa, already present within the periphery of the cumulus oophorus. Spermatozoa that are already deep within the cumulus oophorus may sense the more potent chemoattractant that is secreted from the oocyte and chemotactically guide themselves to the oocyte according to the gradient of this chemoattractant. It should be borne in mind, however, that this is only a model.

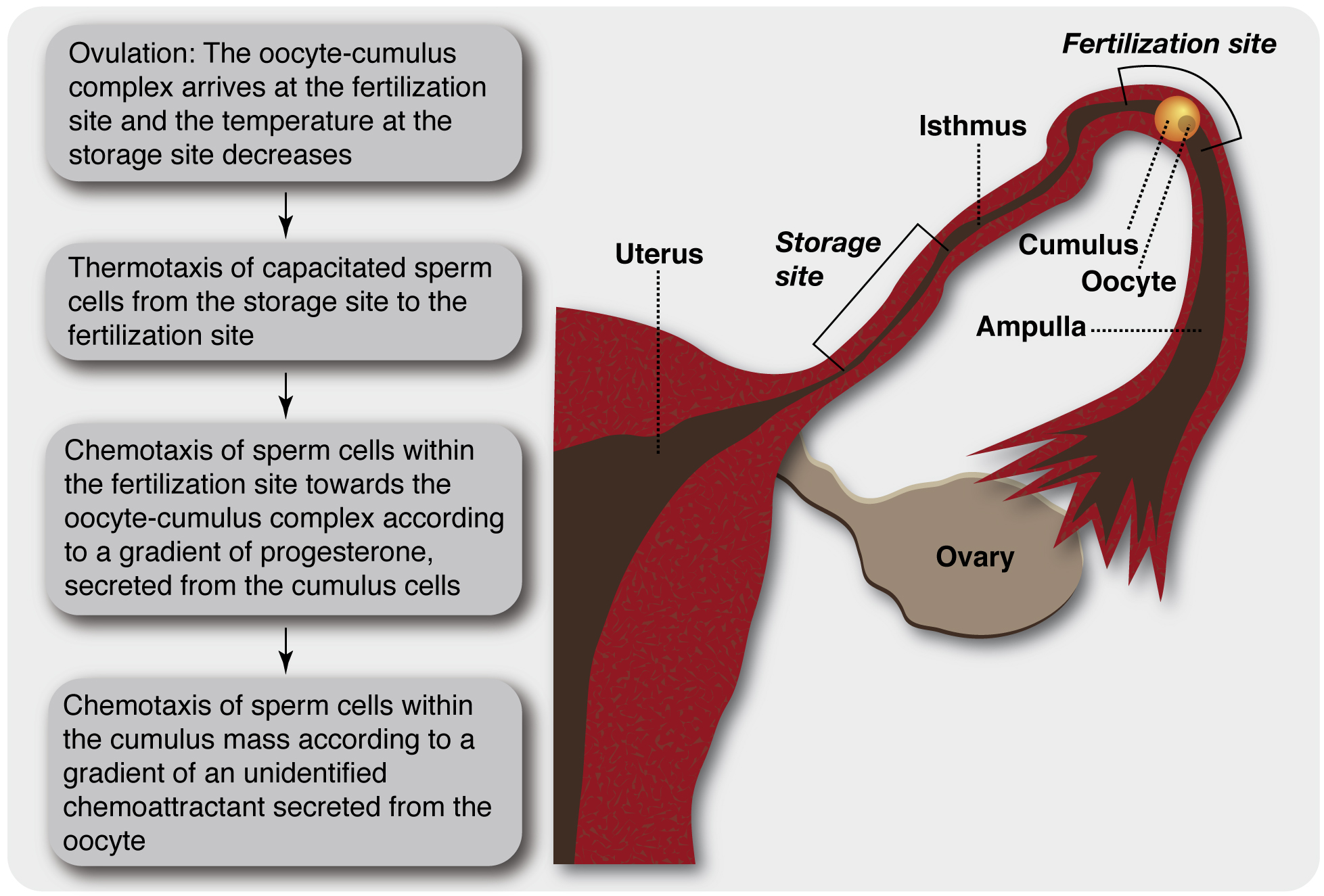

Figure 2. A simplified scheme describing the suggested sequence of active sperm guidance mechanisms in mammals. In addition, two passive processes, sperm rheotaxis and contractions of the oviduct, may assist sperm movement towards the fertilization site.

A number of observations point to the possibility that chemotaxis and thermotaxis also occur at lower parts of the female genital tract. For example, small, gradual estrus cycle-correlated temperature increase was measured in cows from the vagina towards the uterine horns, and a gradient of natriuretic peptide precursor A, shown to be a chemoattractant for mouse spermatozoa, was found, in decreasing concentration order, in the ampulla, isthmus, and uterotubal junction. The physiological functions, if any, of these chemical and temperature gradients are yet to be resolved.

=== Potential clinical applications ===
Sperm guidance by either chemotaxis or thermotaxis can potentially be used to obtain sperm populations that are enriched with capacitated spermatozoa for in vitro fertilization procedures. Indeed, sperm populations selected by thermotaxis were recently shown to have much higher DNA integrity and lower chromatin compaction than unselected spermatozoa and, in mice, to give rise to more and better embryos through intracytoplasmic sperm injection (ICSI), doubling the number of successful pregnancies. Chemotaxis and thermotaxis can also be exploited possibly as a diagnostic tool to assess sperm quality. In addition, these processes can potentially be used, in the long run, as a means of contraception by interfering with the normal process of fertilization.
