= CATSPERQ =

Protein-coding gene in the species Homo sapiens

Identifiers
- Aliases: CATSPERQ, C8ORFK29, TMEM 249, transmembrane protein 249, TMEM249, catsper channel auxiliary subunit theta
- External IDs: MGI: 3647471; GeneCards: CATSPERQ

Gene location (Human)
Chr.	Chromosome 8 (human)
Band	8q24.3	Start	144,352,219 bp
Band	8q24.3	End	144,354,954 bp

Gene location (Mouse)
Chr.	Chromosome 15 (mouse)
Band	15|15 D3	Start	76,417,413 bp
Band	15|15 D3	End	76,419,566 bp
RNA expression pattern
Bgee	Human / Mouse (ortholog); Top expressed in: right testis; left testis; testicle; right hemisphere of cerebellum; mucosa of transverse colon; primary visual cortex; granulocyte; right frontal lobe; ganglionic eminence; Brodmann area 9 / Top expressed in: spermatid; testicle; spermatocyte; morula; embryo; secondary oocyte; embryo; primary oocyte; zygote; olfactory bulb; More reference expression data
BioGPS	n/a
Orthologs
Databases	NCBI: entry; OMA: entry
Species	Human	Mouse
Entrez	340393	666504
Ensembl	ENSG00000261587; ENSG00000285272	ENSMUSG00000116376
UniProt	Q2WGJ8	n/a
RefSeq (mRNA)	NM_001252402; NM_001252404; NM_001280561	NM_001378247
RefSeq (protein)	NP_001239331; NP_001239333; NP_001267490	n/a
Location (UCSC)	Chr 8: 144.35 – 144.35 Mb	Chr 15: 76.42 – 76.42 Mb
PubMed search
- Wikidata
View/Edit Human	View/Edit Mouse

Cation channel sperm-associated auxiliary subunit theta is a protein that in humans is encoded by the CATSPERQ gene (previously TMEM249). The CATSPERQ protein is part of the CatSper complex which is involved in the movement of sperm (in particular hyperactivation).

== Locus ==
CATSPERQ is located near the end of the long arm of chromosome 8 in humans.

General position of CATSPERQ on human chromosome 8 marked by a red line.

== Common aliases ==
CATSPERQ is also known as TMEM249 or C8orfk29.

== Primary sequence and variants or isoforms ==
Isoforms and splice variants of CATSPERQ provided by NCBI's Aceview and Softberry

The primary sequence found at NCBI and Aceview on NCBI predicts there are five spliceforms, with four closely resembling one another and the fifth missing a large 5' intron region. Softberry reinforces the Aceview data by predicting five exons, which are seen in four of the five spliceforms of Aceview.

The general structure of the CATSPERQ transcript has a large 5' UTR followed by exon 1, then a large intron followed by exon 2, a small intron then exon 3. The rest of the protein follows exon 3 with a large intron, exon 4 a small intron then exon 5, the 3' UTR.

The primary transcript contains all five exons and produces a protein that is 235 amino acids long. Transcript 1 and 2 are translated in the 3' to 5' direction while transcripts 3 through 5 are translated in the 5' to 3' direction. The gene is encoded on the minus strand within the chromosome.
