= ABHD2 =

Protein-coding gene in humans

Identifiers
- Aliases: ABHD2, HS1-2, LABH2, PHPS1-2, abhydrolase domain containing 2
- External IDs: OMIM: 612196; MGI: 1914344; GeneCards: ABHD2
Enzyme activity
EC #	BRENDA	ExPASy	KEGG	MetaCyc
3.1.1.6	↗	↗	↗	↗
3.1.1.23	↗	↗	↗	↗
3.1.1.79	↗	↗	↗	↗

Gene location (Human)
Chr.	Chromosome 15 (human)
Band	15q26.1	Start	89,087,459 bp
Band	15q26.1	End	89,202,360 bp

Gene location (Mouse)
Chr.	Chromosome 7 (mouse)
Band	7|7 D2	Start	78,922,947 bp
Band	7|7 D2	End	79,015,256 bp
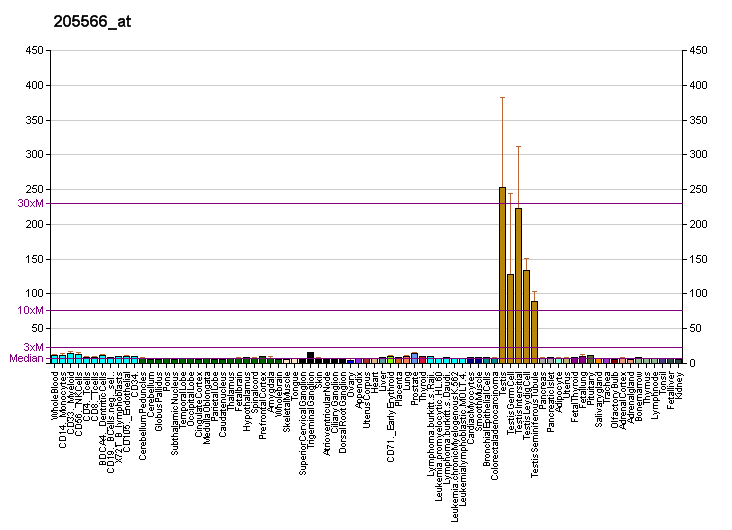
RNA expression pattern
Bgee	Human / Mouse (ortholog); Top expressed in: corpus epididymis; Achilles tendon; islet of Langerhans; gallbladder; spinal ganglia; sperm; duodenum; trigeminal ganglion; left testis; stromal cell of endometrium / Top expressed in: retinal pigment epithelium; gastrula; seminal vesicula; ciliary body; pineal gland; decidua; adrenal gland; seminiferous tubule; submandibular gland; vestibular sensory epithelium; More reference expression data
BioGPS	More reference expression data
Gene ontology
Molecular function	carboxylic ester hydrolase activity; hydrolase activity; acylglycerol lipase activity; hormone binding; steroid hormone receptor activity; lipase activity; short-chain carboxylesterase activity
Cellular component	integral component of membrane; membrane; sperm flagellum; cell projection; sperm plasma membrane; acrosomal vesicle; plasma membrane; cilium; motile cilium
Biological process	negative regulation of cell migration; response to wounding; lipid metabolism; response to progesterone; lipid catabolic process; acylglycerol catabolic process; steroid hormone mediated signaling pathway; acrosome reaction; sperm capacitation; cellular lipid metabolic process; medium-chain fatty acid biosynthetic process; medium-chain fatty acid catabolic process
Sources:Amigo / QuickGO
Orthologs
Databases	NCBI: entry; OMA: entry
Species	Human	Mouse
Entrez	11057	54608
Ensembl	ENSG00000140526	ENSMUSG00000039202
UniProt	P08910	Q9QXM0
RefSeq (mRNA)	NM_007011; NM_152924	NM_018811
RefSeq (protein)	NP_008942; NP_690888; NP_008942.3; NP_690888.1	NP_061281
Location (UCSC)	Chr 15: 89.09 – 89.2 Mb	Chr 7: 78.92 – 79.02 Mb
PubMed search
- Wikidata
View/Edit Human	View/Edit Mouse

Monoacylglycerol lipase ABHD2, also called abhydrolase domain-containing protein 2 (ABHD2), is a serine hydrolase enzyme that is strongly expressed in human spermatozoa. It is a key controller of sperm hyperactivation, which is a necessary step in allowing sperm to fertilize an egg. It is encoded by the ABHD2 gene.

== Structure ==
This gene encodes a protein containing an alpha/beta hydrolase fold, which is a catalytic domain found in a very wide range of enzymes. Alternative splicing of this gene results in two transcript variants encoding the same protein.

== Function ==
In the presence of Progesterone (or Pregnenolone Sulfate,) it cleaves 2-arachidonoylglycerol (2AG) into glycerol and arachidonic acid (AA). 2AG inhibits sperm calcium channel CatSper, and so when ABHD2 removes 2AG calcium flows into the cell through the CatSper channel, leading to hyperactivation.

ABHD2 is inhibited by testosterone, (as well as hydrocortisone, and the plant triterpenoids lupeol and pristimerin) which may prevent premature hyperactivation.

== Role in disease ==
The ABHD2 gene is down regulated in the lungs of people with Emphysema. Analysis of ABHD2 deficiency in mice found a decrease in phosphatidylcholine levels. The mice developed emphysema which was attributed to an increase in macrophage infiltration, increased inflammatory cytokine levels, an imbalance of protease/anti-protease, and an increase in cell death. This research suggests that ABHD2 is important in maintaining the structural integrity of the lungs, and that disruption of phospholipid metabolism in the alveoli may lead to the development of emphysema. Increased expression has also been seen in the lungs of smokers.

ABHD2 is also expressed in atherosclerotic lesions. Expression has been found to be higher in patients with unstable angina than in patients with stable angina.

Up-regulation of ABHD2 has been observed in cells transfected with Hepatitis B virus (HBV) DNA (HepG2.2.15 cells). Expression was down-regulated by the drug lamivudine, used in the treatment of hepatitis B. It has been suggested that ABHD2 has an important role in HBV propagation and could be a potential drug target in the treatment of hepatitis B.

Suppression of ABHD2 has been linked to poor prognoses in ovarian cancer and resistance to platinum-based chemotherapy drugs.
