= Sperm thermotaxis =

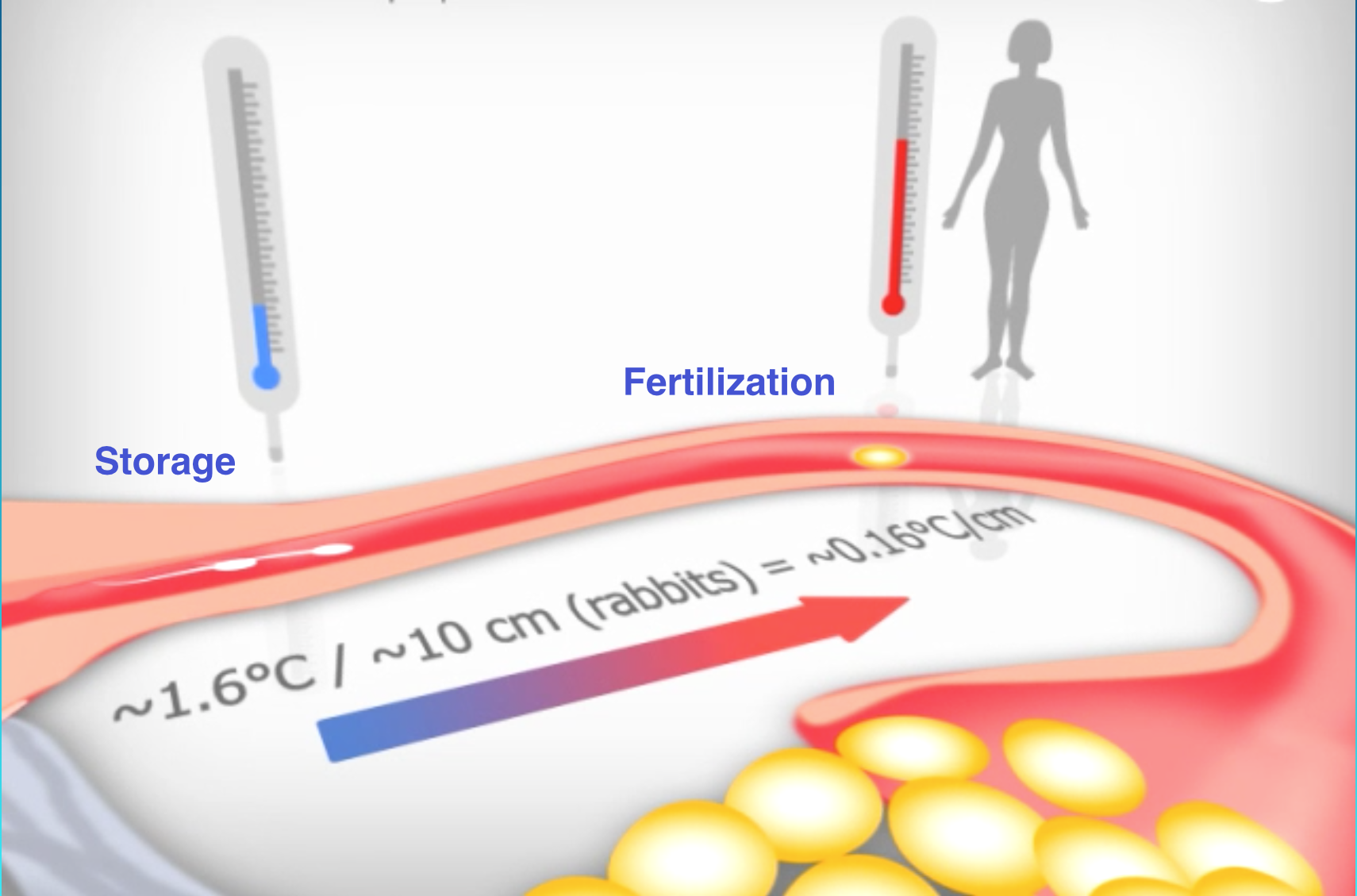
Formation of a temperature gradient in the rabbit's oviduct at ovulation by a temperature drop at the sperm storage site. The scheme is not drawn to scale, and objects are magnified disproportionally for demonstration purposes.

Sperm thermotaxis is a form of sperm guidance, in which sperm cells (spermatozoa) actively change their swimming direction according to a temperature gradient, swimming up the gradient. Thus far this process has been discovered in mammals only.

== Background ==
The discovery of mammalian sperm chemotaxis and the realization that it can guide spermatozoa for short distances only, estimated at the order of millimeters, triggered a search for potential long-range guidance mechanisms. The findings that, at least in rabbits and pigs, a temperature difference exists within the oviduct, and that this temperature difference is established at ovulation in rabbits due to a temperature drop in the oviduct near the junction with the uterus, creating a temperature gradient between the sperm storage site and the fertilization site in the oviduct (Figure 1), led to investigation whether mammalian spermatozoa can respond to a temperature gradient by thermotaxis.

== Establishing sperm thermotaxis as an active process ==
Mammalian sperm thermotaxis was, hitherto, demonstrated in three species: humans, rabbits, and mice. This was done by two methods. One involved a Zigmond chamber, modified to make the temperature in each well separately controllable and measurable. A linear temperature gradient was established between the wells and the swimming of spermatozoa in this gradient was analyzed. A small fraction of the spermatozoa (at the order of ~10%), shown to be the capacitated cells, biased their swimming direction according to the gradient, moving towards the warmer temperature. The other method involved two- or three-compartment separation tube placed within a thermoseparation device that maintains a linear temperature gradient. Sperm accumulation at the warmer end of the separation tube was much higher than the accumulation at the same temperature but in the absence of a temperature gradient. This gradient-dependent sperm accumulation was observed over a wide temperature range (29-41 °C).

Since temperature affects almost every process, much attention has been devoted to the question of whether the measurements, mentioned just above, truly demonstrate thermotaxis or whether they reflect another temperature-dependent process. The most pronounced effect of temperature in liquid is convection, which raised the concern that the apparent thermotactic response could have been a reflection of a passive drift in the liquid current or a rheotactic response to the current (rather than to the temperature gradient per se). Another concern was that the temperature could have changed the local pH of the buffer solution in which the spermatozoa are suspended. This could generate a pH gradient along the temperature gradient, and the spermatozoa might have responded to the formed pH gradient by chemotaxis. However, careful experimental examinations of all these possibilities with proper controls demonstrated that the measured responses to temperature are true thermotactic responses and that they are not a reflection of any other temperature-sensitive process, including rheotaxis and chemotaxis.

== Behavioral mechanism of mammalian sperm thermotaxis ==
The behavioral mechanism of sperm thermotaxis has been so far only investigated in human spermatozoa. Like the behavioral mechanisms of bacterial chemotaxis and human sperm chemotaxis, the behavioral mechanism of human sperm thermotaxis appears to be stochastic rather than deterministic. Capacitated human spermatozoa swim in rather straight lines interrupted by turns and brief episodes of hyperactivation. Each such episode results in swimming in a new direction. When the spermatozoa sense a decrease in temperature, the frequency of turns and hyperactivation events increases due to increased flagellar-wave amplitude that results in enhanced side-to-side head displacement. With time, this response undergoes partial adaptation. The opposite happens in response to an increase in temperature. This suggests that when capacitated spermatozoa swim up a temperature gradient, turns are repressed and the spermatozoa continue swimming in the gradient direction. When they happen to swim down the gradient, they turn again and again until their swimming direction is again up the gradient.

== Temperature sensing ==
The response of spermatozoa to temporal temperature changes even when the temperature is kept constant spatially suggests that, as in the case of human sperm chemotaxis, sperm thermotaxis involves temporal gradient sensing. In other words, spermatozoa apparently compare the temperature (or a temperature-dependent function) between consecutive time points. This, however, does not exclude the occurrence of spatial temperature sensing in addition to temporal sensing. Human spermatozoa can respond thermotactically within a wide temperature range (at least 29–41 °C). Within this range they preferentially accumulate in warmer temperatures rather than at a single specific, preferred temperature. Amazingly, they can sense and thermotactically respond to temperature gradients as low as <0.014 °C/mm. This means that when human spermatozoa swim a distance that equals their body length (~46 μm) they respond to a temperature difference of <0.0006 °C!

== Molecular mechanism ==
The molecular mechanism underlying thermotaxis, in general, and thermosensing with such extreme sensitivity, in particular, is obscure. It is known that, unlike other recognized thermosensors in mammals, the thermosensors for sperm thermotaxis do not seem to be temperature-sensitive ion channels. They are rather opsins, known to be G-protein-coupled receptors that act as photosensors in vision. The opsins are present in spermatozoa at specific sites, which depend on the species and the opsin type. They are involved in sperm thermotaxis via two signaling pathways—a phospholipase C signaling pathway and a cyclic-nucleotide pathway. The former was shown by pharmacological means in human spermatozoa to involve the enzyme phospholipase C, an inositol trisphosphate receptor calcium channel located on internal calcium stores, the calcium channel TRPC3, and intracellular calcium. The latter was hitherto shown to involve phosphodiesterase. Blocking both pathways fully inhibits sperm thermotaxis.
