= Sperm chemotaxis =

Guidance of sperm

Sperm chemotaxis is a form of sperm guidance, in which sperm cells (spermatozoa) follow a concentration gradient of a chemoattractant secreted from the oocyte and thereby reach the oocyte.

== Background ==
Since the discovery of sperm attraction to the female gametes in ferns over a century ago, sperm guidance in the form of sperm chemotaxis has been established in a large variety of species Although sperm chemotaxis is prevalent throughout the Metazoa kingdom, ranging from humans to marine species with external fertilization, such as sea urchins and corals, much of the current information on sperm chemotaxis is derived from studies of marine invertebrates, primarily sea urchin and starfish. As a matter of fact, until not too long ago, the dogma was that, in mammals, guidance of spermatozoa to the oocyte was unnecessary. This was due to the common belief that, following ejaculation into the female genital tract, large numbers of spermatozoa 'race' towards the oocyte and compete to fertilize it.

Research during the 1980s caused this belief to be taken apart when it became clear that only few of the ejaculated spermatozoa — in humans, only ~1 of every million spermatozoa — succeed in entering the oviducts (fallopian tubes) and when more recent studies showed that mammalian spermatozoa do respond chemotactically.

== Sperm chemotaxis in non-mammalian species ==
In sperm chemotaxis, the oocyte secretes a chemoattractant, which, as it diffuses away, forms a concentration gradient: a high concentration close to the egg, and a gradually lower concentration as the distance from the oocyte increases. Spermatozoa can sense this chemoattractant and orient their swimming direction up the concentration gradient towards the oocyte. Sperm chemotaxis was demonstrated in a large number of non-mammalian species, from marine invertebrates to frogs.

=== Chemoattractants ===
The sperm chemoattractants in non-mammalian species vary to a large extent. Some examples are shown in Table 1. So far, most sperm chemoattractants that have been identified in non-mammalian species are peptides or low-molecular-weight proteins (1–20 kDa), which are heat stable and sensitive to proteases. Exceptions to this rule are the sperm chemoattractants of corals, ascidians, plants such as ferns, and algae (Table 1).

=== Table 1. Some sperm chemoattractants in non-mammalian species* ===
Species	Chemoattractant	References
Algae	Low-molecular-weight unsaturated pheromones of cyclic or linear structure (for example 532 Da pentosylated hydroquinone in the case of Chlamydomonas allensworthii)	
Amphibians	Allurin — a 21 kDa protein (for Xenopus)	
Ascidians	SAAF — a sulfated steroid: 3,4,7,26-tetrahydroxycholestane-3,26-disulfate (for Ciona savignyi and intestinalis)	
Corals	A lipid-like long chain fatty alcohol CH_{3}-(CH_{2})_{8}-CH=CH-CH=CH-CH_{2}OH (for Montipora digitata)	
Ferns	Dicarboxylic acids, for example malic acid in its partially ionized form (for Pteridium aquilinum)	
Mollusks	SepSAP — a 6-residue peptide-amide with the sequence PIDPGV-CONH2 (for Sepia officinalis)	
Sea urchins	Resact — a 14-residue peptide with the sequence CVTGAPGCVGGGRL-NH2 (for Arbacia punctulata)	
Starfish	Startrak — a 13 kDa heat-stable protein (for Pycnopodia helianthoides)	

- Taken from reference.

=== Species specificity ===
The variety of chemoattractants raises the question of species specificity with respect to the chemoattractant identity. There is no single rule for chemoattractant-related specificity. Thus, in some groups of marine invertebrates (e.g., hydromedusae and certain ophiuroids), the specificity is very high; in others (e.g., starfish), the specificity is at the family level and, within the family, there is no specificity. In mollusks, there appears to be no specificity at all. Likewise, in plants, a unique simple compound [e.g., fucoserratene — a linear, unsaturated alkene (1,3-trans 5-cis-octatriene)] might be a chemoattractant for various species.

=== Behavioral mechanism ===
Here, too, there is no single rule. In some species (for example, in hydroids like Campanularia or tunicate like Ciona), the swimming direction of the spermatozoa changes abruptly towards the chemoattractant source. In others (for example, in sea urchin, hydromedusa, fern, or fish such as Japanese bitterlings), the approach to the chemoattractant source is indirect and the movement is by repetitive loops of small radii. In some species (for example, herring or the ascidian Ciona) activation of motility precedes chemotaxis. In chemotaxis, cells may either sense a temporal gradient of the chemoattractant, comparing the occupancy of its receptors at different time points (as do bacteria), or they may detect a spatial gradient, comparing the occupancy of receptors at different locations along the cell (as do leukocytes). In the best-studied species, sea urchin, the spermatozoa sense a temporal gradient and respond to it with a transient increase in flagellar asymmetry. The outcome is a turn in the swimming path, followed by a period of straight swimming, leading to the observed epicycloid-like movements directed towards the chemoattractant source. The particular mechanism by which sea urchin sperm cells sense the temporal gradient has been recently identified as a natural implementation of the well-known adaptive controller known as extremum seeking.

=== Molecular mechanism ===
The molecular mechanism of sperm chemotaxis is still not fully known. The current knowledge is mainly based on studies in the sea urchin Arbacia punctulata, where binding of the chemoattractant resact (Table 1) to its receptor, a guanylyl cyclase, activates cGMP synthesis (Figure 1). The resulting rise of cGMP possibly activates K^{+}-selective ion channels. The consequential hyperpolarization activates hyperpolarization-activated and cyclic nucleotide-gated (HCN) channels. The depolarizing inward current through HCN channels possibly activates voltage-activated Ca^{2+} channels, resulting in elevation of intracellular Ca^{2+}. This rise leads to flagellar asymmetry and, consequently, a turn of the sperm cell.

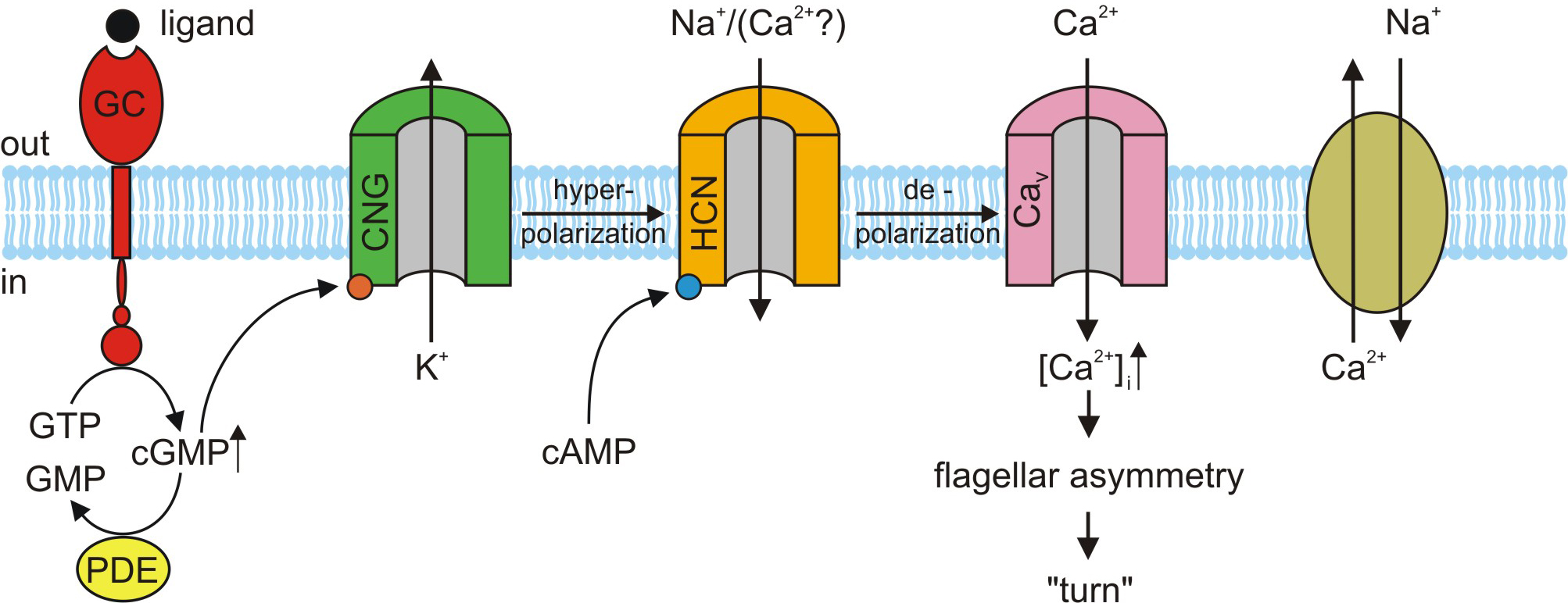

A model of the signal-transduction pathway during sperm chemotaxis of the sea urchin Arbacia punctulata. Binding of a chemoattractant (ligand) to the receptor — a membrane-bound guanylyl cyclase (GC) — activates the synthesis of cGMP from GTP. Cyclic GMP possibly opens cyclic nucleotide-gated (CNG) K^{+}-selective channels, thereby causing hyperpolarization of the membrane. The cGMP signal is terminated by the hydrolysis of cGMP through phosphodiesterase (PDE) activity and inactivation of GC. On hyperpolarization, hyperpolarization-activated and cyclic nucleotide-gated (HCN) channels allow the influx of Na^{+} that leads to depolarization and thereby causes a rapid Ca^{2+} entry through voltage-activated Ca^{2+} channels (Ca_{v}), Ca^{2+} ions interact by unknown mechanisms with the axoneme of the flagellum and cause an increase of the asymmetry of flagellar beat and eventually a turn or bend in the swimming trajectory. Ca^{2+} is removed from the flagellum by a Na^{+}/Ca^{2+} exchange mechanism. (Taken from ref.)

== Sperm chemotaxis in mammals ==
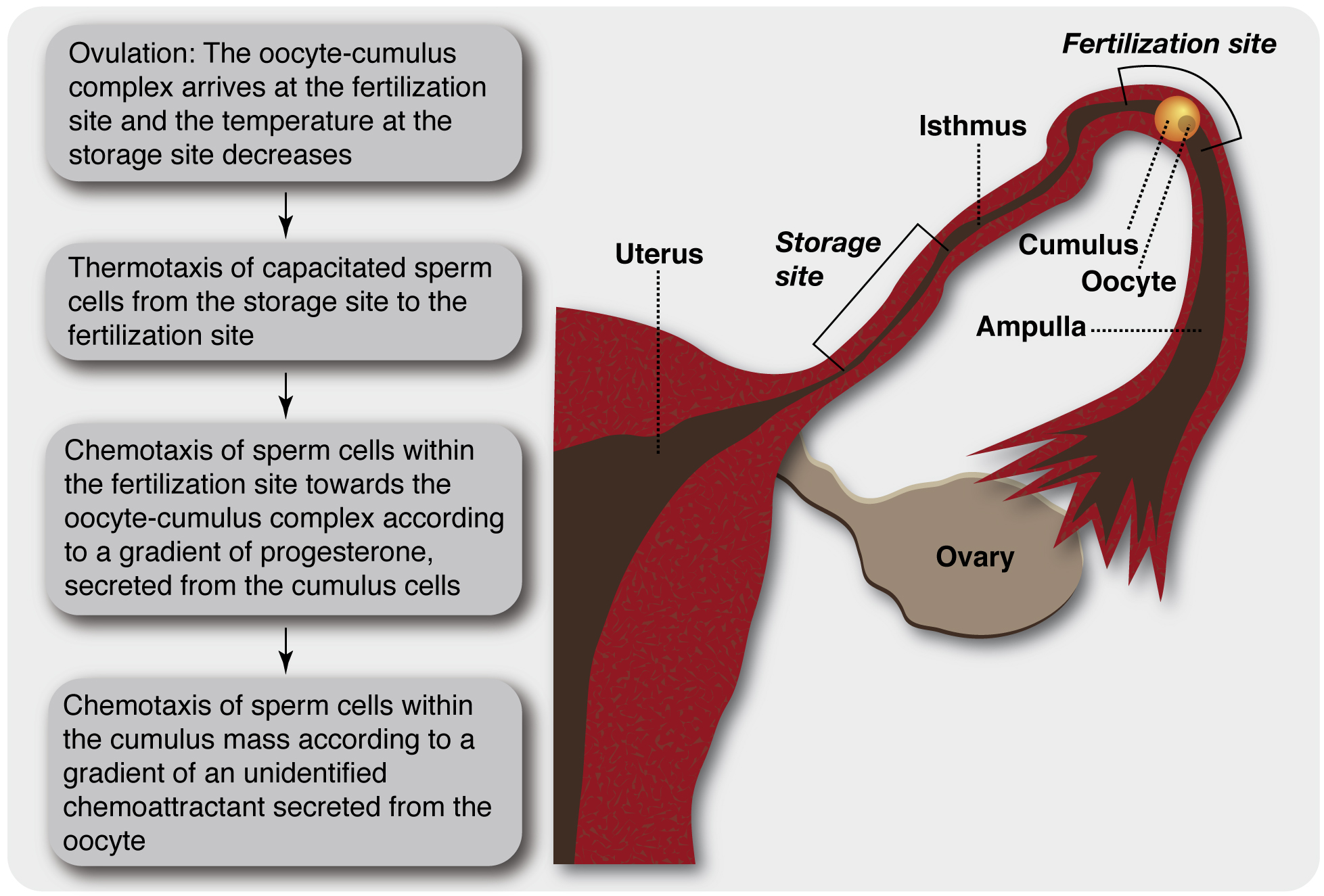
A simplified scheme describing the suggested sequence of sperm guidance events in mammals (Michael Eisenbach, Weizmann Institute of Science, 2009)

Following the findings that human spermatozoa accumulate in follicular fluid and that there is a remarkable correlation between this in vitro accumulation and oocyte fertilization, chemotaxis was substantiated as the cause of this accumulation. Sperm chemotaxis was later also demonstrated in mice and rabbits. In addition, sperm accumulation in follicular fluid (but without substantiating that it truly reflects chemotaxis) was demonstrated in horses and pigs. A key feature of sperm chemotaxis in humans is that this process is restricted to capacitated cells — the only cells that possess the ability to penetrate the oocyte and fertilize it. This raised the possibility that, in mammals, chemotaxis is not solely a guidance mechanism but it is also a mechanism of sperm selection. Importantly, the fraction of capacitated (and, hence, chemotactically responsive) spermatozoa is low (~10% in humans), the life span of the capacitated/chemotactic state is short (1–4 hours in humans), a spermatozoon can be at this state only once in its lifetime, and sperm individuals become capacitated/chemotactic at different time points, resulting in continuous replacement of capacitated/chemotactic cells within the sperm population, i.e., prolonged availability of capacitated cells. These sperm features raised the possibility that prolonging the time period, during which capacitated spermatozoa can be found in the female genital tract, is a mechanism, evolved in humans, to compensate for the lack of coordination between insemination and ovulation.

=== Chemoattractants ===
In humans, there are at least two different origins of sperm chemoattractants. One is the cumulus cells that surround the oocyte, and the other is the mature oocyte itself. The chemoattractant secreted from the cumulus cells is the steroid progesterone, shown to be effective at the picomolar range. The chemoattractant secreted from the oocyte is even more potent. It is a hydrophobic non-peptide molecule which, when secreted from the oocyte, is in complex with a carrier protein Additional compounds have been shown to act as chemoattractants for mammalian spermatozoa. They include the chemokine CCL20, atrial natriuretic peptide (ANP), specific odorants, natriuretic peptide type C (NPPC), and allurin, to mention a few. It is reasonable to assume that not all of them are physiologically relevant.

=== Species specificity ===
Species specificity was not detected in experiments that compared the chemotactic responsiveness of human and rabbit spermatozoa to follicular fluids or egg-conditioned media obtained from human, bovine, and rabbit. The subsequent findings that cumulus cells of both human and rabbit (and, probably, of other mammals as well) secrete the chemoattractant progesterone is sufficient to account for the lack of specificity in the chemotactic response of mammalian spermatozoa.

=== Behavioral mechanism ===
Mammalian spermatozoa, like sea-urchin spermatozoa, appear to sense the chemoattractant gradient temporally (comparing receptor occupancy over time) rather than spatially (comparing receptor occupancy over space). This is because the establishment of a temporal gradient in the absence of spatial gradient, achieved by mixing human spermatozoa with a chemoattractant or by photorelease of a chemoattractant from its caged compound, results in delayed transient changes in swimming behavior that involve increased frequency of turns and hyperactivation events. On the basis of these observations and the finding that the level of hyperactivation events is reduced when chemotactically responsive spermatozoa swim in a spatial chemoattractant gradient it was proposed that turns and hyperactivation events are suppressed when capacitated spermatozoa swim up a chemoattractant gradient, and vice versa when they swim down a gradient. In other words, human spermatozoa approach chemoattractants by modulating the frequency of turns and hyperactivation events, similarly to Escherichia coli bacteria.

=== Molecular mechanism ===
As in non-mammalian species, the end signal in chemotaxis for changing the direction of swimming is Ca^{2+}. The discovery of progesterone as a chemoattractant led to the identification of its receptor on the sperm surface – CatSper, a Ca^{2+} channel present exclusively in the tail of mammalian spermatozoa. (Note, though, that progesterone only stimulates human CatSper but not mouse CatSper. Consistently, sperm chemotaxis to progesterone was not found in mice.) However, the molecular steps subsequent to CatSper activation by progesterone are obscure, though the involvement of trans-membrane adenylyl cyclase, cAMP and protein kinase A as well as soluble guanylyl cyclase, cGMP, inositol trisphosphate receptor and store-operated Ca^{2+} channel was proposed.

=== Physiology ===
Chemotaxis is a short-range guidance mechanism. As such, it can guide spermatozoa for short distances only, estimated at the order of millimeters. It is, therefore, believed that, in mammals, sperm chemotaxis occurs in the oviduct, close to the oocyte. First spermatozoa may be chemotactically guided to the oocyte-cumulus complex by the gradient of progesterone, secreted from the cumulus cells. In addition, progesterone may inwardly guide spermatozoa, already present within the periphery of the cumulus oophorus. Spermatozoa that are already deep within the cumulus oophorus may sense the more potent chemoattractant that is secreted from the oocyte and chemotactically guide themselves to the oocyte according to the gradient of this chemoattractant. It should be borne in mind, however, that this scenario may be an oversimplification. In view of the increasing number of different chemoattractants that are being discovered, the physiology of chemotaxis in vivo might be much more complex.
