= CATSPER3 =

Protein-coding gene in the species Homo sapiens

Identifiers
- Aliases: CATSPER3, CACRC, CatSper3, cation channel sperm associated 3
- External IDs: OMIM: 609120; MGI: 1924106; GeneCards: CATSPER3

Gene location (Human)
Chr.	Chromosome 5 (human)
Band	5q31.1	Start	134,967,907 bp
Band	5q31.1	End	135,011,696 bp

Gene location (Mouse)
Chr.	Chromosome 13 (mouse)
Band	13|13 B1	Start	55,932,381 bp
Band	13|13 B1	End	55,956,811 bp
RNA expression pattern
Bgee	Human / Mouse (ortholog); Top expressed in: sperm; right testis; left testis; testicle; gonad; gastrocnemius muscle; muscle of thigh; right uterine tube; mucosa of transverse colon; gastric mucosa / Top expressed in: spermatid; seminiferous tubule; embryo; spermatocyte; embryo; primary oocyte; muscle of thigh; zygote; proximal tubule; digastric muscle; More reference expression data
BioGPS	n/a
Gene ontology
Molecular function	voltage-gated calcium channel activity; calcium channel activity; voltage-gated ion channel activity; ion channel activity; cation channel activity
Cellular component	integral component of membrane; CatSper complex; cell projection; membrane; plasma membrane; cilium; acrosomal vesicle; endoplasmic reticulum; motile cilium
Biological process	flagellated sperm motility; cell differentiation; membrane depolarization during action potential; sodium ion transport; regulation of ion transmembrane transport; ion transport; multicellular organism development; ion transmembrane transport; calcium ion transmembrane transport; transmembrane transport; spermatogenesis; sperm-egg recognition; sperm capacitation; calcium ion transport; response to progesterone
Sources:Amigo / QuickGO
Orthologs
Databases	NCBI: entry; OMA: entry
Species	Human	Mouse
Entrez	347732	76856
Ensembl	ENSG00000152705	ENSMUSG00000021499
UniProt	Q86XQ3	Q80W99
RefSeq (mRNA)	NM_178019	NM_001252487; NM_001252488; NM_029772
RefSeq (protein)	NP_821138	NP_001239416; NP_001239417; NP_084048
Location (UCSC)	Chr 5: 134.97 – 135.01 Mb	Chr 13: 55.93 – 55.96 Mb
PubMed search
- Wikidata
View/Edit Human	View/Edit Mouse

CatSper3, is a protein which in humans is encoded by the CATSPER3 gene. CatSper3 is a member of the cation channels of sperm family of proteins. The four proteins in this family together form a Ca^{2+}-permeant ion channel specific essential for the correct function of sperm cells.
