= CATSPER4 =

Protein found in humans

Identifiers
- Aliases: CATSPER4, CatSper4, cation channel sperm associated 4
- External IDs: OMIM: 609121; MGI: 3043288; GeneCards: CATSPER4

Gene location (Human)
Chr.	Chromosome 1 (human)
Band	1p36.11	Start	26,190,561 bp
Band	1p36.11	End	26,202,968 bp

Gene location (Mouse)
Chr.	Chromosome 4 (mouse)
Band	4|4 D2.3	Start	133,939,281 bp
Band	4|4 D2.3	End	133,954,694 bp
RNA expression pattern
Bgee	Human / Mouse (ortholog); Top expressed in: left testis; right testis; muscle of thigh; gastrocnemius muscle; skeletal muscle tissue; mucosa of transverse colon; right uterine tube; lobe of thyroid gland; left lobe of thyroid gland; tibial nerve / Top expressed in: spermatid; testicle; spermatocyte; muscle of thigh; neural layer of retina; embryo; muscle tissue; quadriceps femoris muscle; jejunum; skeletal muscle tissue; More reference expression data
BioGPS	n/a
Gene ontology
Molecular function	voltage-gated calcium channel activity; calcium activated cation channel activity; calcium channel activity; voltage-gated ion channel activity; ion channel activity; NAADP-sensitive calcium-release channel activity
Cellular component	integral component of membrane; CatSper complex; cell projection; membrane; plasma membrane; cilium; sperm principal piece; acrosomal vesicle; motile cilium
Biological process	flagellated sperm motility; cell differentiation; membrane depolarization during action potential; sodium ion transport; regulation of ion transmembrane transport; ion transport; multicellular organism development; calcium ion transmembrane transport; transmembrane transport; spermatogenesis; sperm-egg recognition; sperm capacitation; release of sequestered calcium ion into cytosol; calcium ion transport; response to progesterone
Sources:Amigo / QuickGO
Orthologs
Databases	NCBI: entry; OMA: entry
Species	Human	Mouse
Entrez	378807	329954
Ensembl	ENSG00000188782	ENSMUSG00000048003
UniProt	Q7RTX7	Q8BVN3
RefSeq (mRNA)	NM_198137	NM_001130030; NM_177866
RefSeq (protein)	NP_937770	NP_001123502; NP_808534
Location (UCSC)	Chr 1: 26.19 – 26.2 Mb	Chr 4: 133.94 – 133.95 Mb
PubMed search
- Wikidata
View/Edit Human	View/Edit Mouse

CatSper4, is a protein which in humans is encoded by the CATSPER4 gene. CatSper1 is a member of the cation channels of sperm family of protein. The four proteins in this family together form a Ca^{2+}-permeant ion channel specific essential for the correct function of sperm cells.
