= CATSPER1 =

Protein-coding gene in the species Homo sapiens

Identifiers
- Aliases: CATSPER1, CATSPER, SPGF7, CatSper1, cation channel sperm associated 1
- External IDs: OMIM: 606389; MGI: 2179947; GeneCards: CATSPER1

Gene location (Human)
Chr.	Chromosome 11 (human)
Band	11q13.1	Start	66,016,752 bp
Band	11q13.1	End	66,026,479 bp

Gene location (Mouse)
Chr.	Chromosome 19 (mouse)
Band	19|19 A	Start	5,385,769 bp
Band	19|19 A	End	5,394,308 bp
RNA expression pattern
Bgee	Human / Mouse (ortholog); Top expressed in: testicle; monocyte; granulocyte; left testis; right testis; Descending thoracic aorta; ascending aorta; blood; popliteal artery; tibial arteries / Top expressed in: seminiferous tubule; spermatid; spermatocyte; islet of Langerhans; More reference expression data
BioGPS	n/a
Gene ontology
Molecular function	calcium activated cation channel activity; calcium channel activity; voltage-gated ion channel activity; ion channel activity; protein binding; high voltage-gated calcium channel activity; voltage-gated calcium channel activity
Cellular component	integral component of membrane; CatSper complex; cell projection; membrane; plasma membrane; cilium; motile cilium
Biological process	cell differentiation; membrane depolarization during action potential; regulation of ion transmembrane transport; ion transport; multicellular organism development; calcium ion transmembrane transport; transmembrane transport; spermatogenesis; sperm-egg recognition; calcium ion transport; flagellated sperm motility; regulation of cilium beat frequency involved in ciliary motility; response to progesterone
Sources:Amigo / QuickGO
Orthologs
Databases	NCBI: entry; OMA: entry
Species	Human	Mouse
Entrez	117144	225865
Ensembl	ENSG00000175294	ENSMUSG00000038498
UniProt	Q8NEC5	Q91ZR5
RefSeq (mRNA)	NM_053054	NM_139301
RefSeq (protein)	NP_444282	NP_647462
Location (UCSC)	Chr 11: 66.02 – 66.03 Mb	Chr 19: 5.39 – 5.39 Mb
PubMed search
- Wikidata
View/Edit Human	View/Edit Mouse

CatSper1, is a protein which in humans is encoded by the CATSPER1 gene. CatSper1 is a member of the cation channels of sperm family of protein. The four proteins in this family together form a Ca^{2+}-permeant ion channel specific essential for the correct function of sperm cells.

== Function ==
Calcium ions play a primary role in the regulation of sperm motility. This gene belongs to a family of putative cation channels that are specific to spermatozoa and localize to the flagellum. The protein family features a single repeat with six membrane-spanning segments and a predicted calcium-selective pore region.
