= CATSPER2 =

Protein-coding gene in the species Homo sapiens

Identifiers
- Aliases: CATSPER2, CatSper2, cation channel sperm associated 2
- External IDs: OMIM: 607249; MGI: 2387404; GeneCards: CATSPER2

Gene location (Human)
Chr.	Chromosome 15 (human)
Band	15q15.3	Start	43,628,503 bp
Band	15q15.3	End	43,668,118 bp

Gene location (Mouse)
Chr.	Chromosome 2 (mouse)
Band	2|2 E5	Start	121,223,112 bp
Band	2|2 E5	End	121,244,273 bp
RNA expression pattern
Bgee	Human / Mouse (ortholog); Top expressed in: cerebellar vermis; right hemisphere of cerebellum; right testis; left testis; buccal mucosa cell; anterior pituitary; right uterine tube; nipple; right frontal lobe; right lobe of thyroid gland / Top expressed in: seminiferous tubule; spermatid; spermatocyte; soleus muscle; submandibular gland; gastrula; primary oocyte; neural layer of retina; molar; ankle; More reference expression data
BioGPS	n/a
Gene ontology
Molecular function	calcium activated cation channel activity; calcium channel activity; voltage-gated ion channel activity; ion channel activity; protein binding; voltage-gated sodium channel activity
Cellular component	integral component of membrane; CatSper complex; cell projection; membrane; plasma membrane; cilium; motile cilium
Biological process	cell differentiation; membrane depolarization during action potential; regulation of ion transmembrane transport; ion transport; multicellular organism development; calcium ion transmembrane transport; transmembrane transport; spermatogenesis; sperm-egg recognition; calcium ion transport; neuronal action potential; flagellated sperm motility; sodium ion transmembrane transport; fertilization; sperm capacitation; response to progesterone
Sources:Amigo / QuickGO
Orthologs
Databases	NCBI: entry; OMA: entry
Species	Human	Mouse
Entrez	117155	212670
Ensembl	ENSG00000166762	ENSMUSG00000033486
UniProt	Q96P56	A2ARP9
RefSeq (mRNA)	NM_001282309; NM_001282310; NM_054020; NM_172095; NM_172097	NM_153075
RefSeq (protein)	NP_001269238; NP_001269239; NP_742093	n/a
Location (UCSC)	Chr 15: 43.63 – 43.67 Mb	Chr 2: 121.22 – 121.24 Mb
PubMed search
- Wikidata
View/Edit Human	View/Edit Mouse

CatSper2, is a protein which in humans is encoded by the CATSPER2 gene. CatSper2 is a member of the cation channels of sperm family of protein. The four proteins in this family together form a Ca^{2+}-permeant ion channel specific essential for the correct function of sperm cells.

== Function ==
Calcium ions play a primary role in the regulation of sperm motility. This gene belongs to a family of putative cation channels that are specific to spermatozoa and localize to the flagellum. The protein family features a single repeat with six membrane-spanning segments and a predicted calcium-selective pore region. This gene is part of a tandem repeat on chromosome 15q15; the second copy of this gene is thought to be a pseudogene.

== See also ==
- Pseudogene (database)
