= External fertilization =

Form of reproduction where fertilization occurs outside of the female's body

External fertilization is a mode of reproduction in which a male organism's sperm fertilizes a female organism's egg outside of the female's body. It is contrasted with internal fertilization, in which sperm are introduced via insemination and then combine with an egg inside the body of a female organism.

In animals, external fertilization typically occurs in water or a moist area to facilitate the movement of sperm to the egg. The release of eggs and sperm into the water is known as spawning. In motile species, spawning females often travel to a suitable location to release their eggs. However, sessile species are less able to move to spawning locations and must release gametes locally. Among vertebrates, external fertilization is most common in amphibians and fish. Invertebrates utilizing external fertilization are mostly benthic, sessile, or both, including animals such as coral, sea anemones, and tube-dwelling polychaetes. Benthic marine plants also reproduce through external fertilization. Environmental factors and timing are key challenges to the success of external fertilization. While in the water, the male and female must both release gametes at similar times in order to fertilize the egg. Gametes spawned into the water may also be washed away, eaten, or damaged by external factors.

== Sexual selection ==
Sexual selection may not seem to occur during external fertilization, but there are ways it actually can. The two types of external fertilizers are nest builders and broadcast spawners. For female nest builders, the main choice is the location of where to lay her eggs. A female can choose a nest close to the male she wants to fertilize her eggs, but there is no guarantee that the preferred male will fertilize any of the eggs. Broadcast spawners have a very weak selection, due to the randomness of releasing gametes. To look into the effect of female choice on external fertilization, an in vitro sperm competition experiment was performed. The results concluded that there was a decreased importance of sperm number, but increased the importance of the sperm velocity, thus changing the outcome of sperm competition. The ovarian fluid also increased the paternity for the preferred male because they release fewer and faster sperm. The success of a male fertilizing an egg relies on the ability of a male's sperm to outcompete other sperm that is looking to fertilize the same egg. Sperm chemotaxis is the use of chemical signals to give sperm the ability to navigate an egg and is a huge contributor to reproductive success.

== Invertebrates ==
Benthic sessile animals that make up the majority of invertebrates using external fertilization rely on ambient water motion to bring the sperm and eggs together. Other invertebrates that externally fertilize are organisms like the sea urchin, are confined to shallow burrows on exposed shores. Turbulent flows in the surf zone also create a transport of gametes. Hydrodynamic conditions and gamete properties control the efficiency of fertilization because they influence the rate at which the water mixes. The only dilemma with turbulence is the possibility of dilution of sperm and egg because of over mixing. Rapid mixing can cause a lower probability to fertilize. Sessile adult staged animals commonly produce gametes at the same times, also known as a synchronized release of gametes, for external fertilization in the water column. This is helpful because of the lack of mobility these organisms share. They also can rely on turbulent mixing and sperm mobility to enhance the chances of fertilization.

The presence of food, resources, favorable environmental conditions, and the lack of predators are thought of when thinking of survival of the next generation. When the female is producing eggs, they perform predator satiation, which is when multiple females will release gametes in a mass reproductive event. The Great Barrier Reef is known for having a "mass spawn." This occurs the week after the full moon in October. This mass reproductive event is given by reef forming corals, which perform a synchronized release of gametes in one evening from dusk to midnight. Up to 130 species release gametes during this time. In some cases, fertilization can take place on a spawning animal's surface and when the animals are in the turbulent wake. Although fertilization is usually thought of as a short-term process, there is the possibility of gametes being retained on the surface of an animal for an extended period of time. In order to release an egg or sperm over time, clumps are formed that float in the water column. This allows for a variation in locations and time differences of fertilization taking place by the same invertebrate.

== Vertebrates ==
=== Amphibians ===
The earliest amphibians were all internal fertilizers. It was not until 300 million years ago that the Anura (early internal fertilizer) and Caudata (early external fertilizer) orders had begun. Most anurans now externally fertilize. Anurans are the amphibians lacking a tail such as frogs and toads. Anurans are commonly used as a model organism for amphibians, because of the large, easy to manipulate eggs, fast developmental rate, high fecundity rate, no parental involvement, and external fertilization. Males will congregate near a lake or pond and establish calling stations. Females approach the area and listen to all of the different male calls, and then continue to move towards the mate she chooses. This is the anuran's sexual selection. It has been concluded that females prefer a male with a more attractive call, which is also the larger male. Copulation occurs when a male anuran hops onto the back of a female. They then move to a spot near water to simultaneously release their sperm and eggs. Other males in the area can also release sperm onto the eggs to also attempt to fertilize the eggs. If the female does not want to reproduce with the male that jumps onto her back, she will wait until the male leaves or move to a new location. Sperm released into the water must be in close proximity, get to the egg first, and then enter the gel layer of the egg to have the best chance of fertilizing. When the anurans are not close to eggs, they sometimes release their sperm into oocyte containing foam nests, or terrestrial breeders go right to the gel coat of the oocyte to release their sperm. Over the course of a breeding season, a male can copulate numerous times by releasing sperm anywhere he finds unfertilized eggs or encounters a female who wants to spawn. Females, however, can only release eggs once per breeding season. Releasing sperm directly into the water increases sperm competition through agonistic behavior and spawning in groups. This has been tested, with good evidence associated with a larger sperm number and testes size. Smaller testes size and a slower sperm velocity were seen with the anurans that released the sperm into the foam nests instead of into open water. To further increase sperm competition, there is a larger thickness to an anuran oocyte gel, specifically the green tree frog. Anuran sperm also have high longevity and osmotic tolerance compared to fresh water fish.

The Caudata order contains all of the salamanders and newts, amphibians that have tails. Within this, the only subgroups that externally fertilize are Cryptobranchidae (giant salamanders), Sirenidae, and Hynobiidae. The females release egg sacs onto stones or branches and the male later hovers over the eggs to release the sperm to them. Males are seen to be very protective over the eggs and may continue to hover over the eggs after sperm release to decrease sperm competition. In some cases, males may even latch onto the females while they lay their eggs to ensure that they fertilize them first. Other times there may be numerous males surrounding a single sac of eggs, creating scramble competition. Cryptobranchid sperm is seen to have higher longevity. This is about 600 times greater than in freshwater fish, but not even close to as high as anurans.

=== Fish ===
Salmon, cod, trout, and char are all examples of the fish that externally fertilize. The females release roe (an egg mass) and the males release milt (seminal fluid containing sperm) into the water, where they diffuse together and fertilize. On top of the sperm locating the oocyte and penetrating the gel layer, it must also infiltrate the mycropyle. If there is turbulent water or even in open, calm water, the closer fish that releases sperm has the higher chance of fertilizing the eggs. If sperm is released too early, it can become too dilute or die before it ever reaches the eggs. If sperm is released too late, there is a higher chance that a different fish's sperm has already reached the eggs. Also, the faster and more numerous the sperm, the better. There are instances where males will create habitats in an attempt to monopolize females and increase their chance of fertilizing eggs.

Fishes can be iteroparous, and spawn more than once, but there are some who only spawn once before death, known as semelparous. Within iteroparous fish, they usually give no parental care with external fertilization. The sperm present in male fish are immotile while in testes and in seminal fluid, and the fertilization environment determines when the sperm become motile. In salmon, a decrease of potassium in fresh water will initiate the motility of the sperm. A decrease in osmolality after spawning in fresh water makes a cyprinid fish's sperm motile.

== See also ==
- Fertilization
