= Hyperactivation =

Type of sperm cell motility

Hyperactivation is a type of sperm motility. Hyperactivated sperm motility is characterised by a high amplitude, asymmetrical beating pattern of the sperm tail (flagellum). This type of motility may aid in sperm penetration of the zona pellucida, which encloses the ovum.

Hyperactivation could then be followed by the acrosome reaction where the cap-like structure on the head of the cell releases the enzymes it contains. This facilitates the penetration of the ovum and fertilisation.

Some definitions consider sperm activation to consist of these two processes of hyperactivation and the acrosome reaction.

Hyperactivation is a term also used to express an X chromosome gene dosage compensation mechanism and is seen in Drosophila. Here, a complex of proteins bind to the X-linked genes to effectively double their genetic activity. This allows males (XY) to have equal genetic activity as females (XX), whose X's are not hyperactivated.

== Mechanisms ==
Mammalian sperm cells become more active when they approach an egg cell in a process called sperm activation. Sperm activation has been shown to be caused by calcium ionophores in vitro, progesterone released by nearby cumulus cells and binding to ZP3 of the zona pellucida.

The initial change is called "hyperactivation", which causes a change in spermatozoa motility. They swim faster and their tail movements become more forceful and erratic.

A recent discovery links hyperactivation to a sudden influx of calcium ion into the tails. The whip-like tail (flagellum) of the sperm is studded with ion channels formed by proteins called CatSper. These channels are selective, allowing only calcium ion to pass. The opening of CatSper channels is responsible for the influx of calcium. The sudden rise in calcium levels causes the flagellum to form deeper bends, propelling the sperm more forcefully through the viscous environment. Sperm hyperactivity is necessary for breaking through two physical barriers that protect the egg from fertilization.

Hyperactivation has also shown to serve as a feature of the human sperm chemotaxis. When the sperm is exposed to chemo-attractant, especially progesterone; the sperm will exhibit sudden flagellar arrest, followed by sharp turn and hyperactivation. This response suggests that hyperactivation serves as method to quickly guide sperm through chemo-attractant gradient.

== Importance to fertilization ==
Before reaching the egg, the sperm are often trapped in epithelial cells in a fallopian tube, meaning they are rendered inert unless they undergo hyperactivation. The change in motion and force of the tail movements enable the sperm to escape from the epithelium. Thus, only those sperm which have undergone hyperactivation have the ability to fertilize the egg.

== See also ==
- Capacitation
- Acrosome reaction
