= WALP peptide =

Class of peptides used for studying lipid membranes

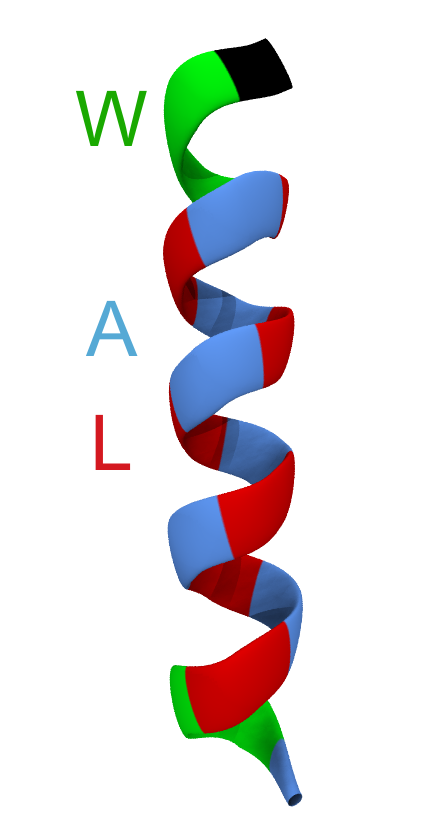
WALP-19 protein peptide of the following sequence of 19 amino acids: GWWLALALALALALALWWA. Tryptophan residues are shown in green while leucines and alanines are displayed in red and blue, respectively.

WALP peptides are a class of synthesized, membrane-spanning α-helices composed of tryptophan (W), alanine (A), and leucine (L) amino acids. They are designed to study properties of proteins in lipid membranes such as orientation, extent of insertion, and hydrophobic mismatch.

== Significance ==
The transmembrane region of many integral membrane proteins consists of one or more alpha helices. The orientations and interactions of these helices directly affect cell signaling and molecular transport across the bilayer. The hydrophobic environment of the phospholipid tails in turn modulates the position and structure of such domains and thus may influence protein function. Conversely, the bilayer itself can (locally) change the thickness of its hydrocarbon region to interact optimally with hydrophobic regions of a transmembrane protein (a.k.a. hydrophobic matching). WALPs provide an effective model for studying such interactions because of their systematic design of a core of hydrophobic, alternating alanine and leucine regions. This core is readily manipulated by extending or decreasing the number of amino acids. Another key feature is the presence of "anchoring" residues at the ends of the helix, which are tryptophan residues in the WALP versions. Substituting the anchoring tryptophan residues for charged residues, such as lysine, yields "KALP" peptides. This class of model peptides has proved useful for studying the impact of changes in lipid composition on peptide insertion. Following detailed experimental studies by various techniques, the WALP and related peptides have become commonly used model systems in computational biology.

== Responses to lipid environment ==
When hydrophobic mismatch occurs, WALPs are known to tilt in the bilayer. The extent of this tilt is affected up to a certain point by an entropy contribution that arises from the helix's presence in the bilayer and then by more specific helix-lipid interactions. When charged residues are substituted for the anchoring residues, these charged amino acids prefer a higher position, farther from the interior of the lipid bilayer, in order to maintain their energetically favorable interaction with water. This interaction thus promotes a smaller angle of tilt.
