= Hydrophobic mismatch =

Hydrophobic mismatch is the difference between the thicknesses of hydrophobic regions of a transmembrane protein and of the biological membrane it spans. In order to avoid unfavorable exposure of hydrophobic surfaces to water, the hydrophobic regions of transmembrane proteins are expected to have approximately the same thickness as the hydrophobic (lipid acyl chain) region of the surrounding lipid bilayer. Nevertheless, the same membrane protein can be encountered in bilayers of different thickness. In eukaryotic cells, the plasma membrane is thicker than the membranes of the endoplasmic reticulum. Yet all proteins that are abundant in the plasma membrane are initially integrated into the endoplasmic reticulum upon synthesis on ribosomes. Transmembrane peptides or proteins and surrounding lipids can adapt to the hydrophobic mismatch by different means.

== Possible adaptations to mismatch ==
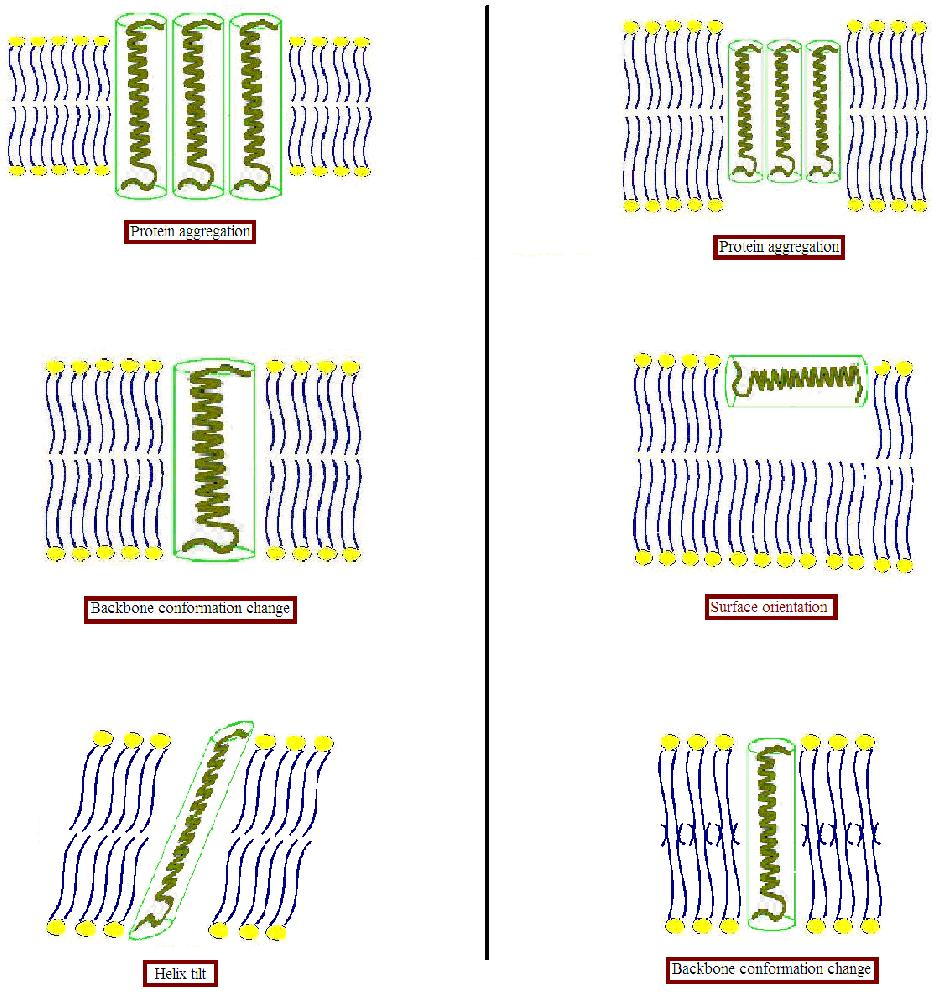
Hydrophobic Mismatch.

In order to avoid unfavorable exposure of hydrophobic surfaces to a hydrophilic environment, biological membrane tends to adapt to such mismatch. For example, an integral membrane protein tends to surround itself by lipids of matching size and shape due to protein and lipid segregation. Since proteins are relatively rigid, whereas lipid hydrocarbon chains are flexible, the condition of hydrophobic matching can be fulfilled by stretching, squashing, and/or tilting of the lipid chains

- When the hydrophobic part of a transmembrane protein is too thick to match the hydrophobic bilayer thickness (left part of Figure), the protein can aggregate in the membrane to minimize the exposed hydrophobic area or tilt to reduce their effective hydrophobic thickness. They can also adopt by changing the orientation of hydrophobic and hydrophilic side chains near the interface. Lipids in turn can modulate the membrane thickness by stretching their acyl chains.
- When the hydrophobic part of a transmembrane protein is too thin to match the hydrophobic bilayer thickness (right part of Figure), again this might result in protein aggregation, or changes in backbone conformation and/or side chain orientation. Too short peptides may adopt a surface localization. Lipids could decrease the local bilayer thickness by disordering their acyl chains.

=== Protein aggregation ===
Since Mouritsen and Bloom proposed the detailed thermodynamic model, which includes adaptation of the lipids and induction of protein segregation at a more extreme mismatch in their “Mattress Model”, more additional insight into mismatch-induced protein aggregation has been obtained. Also some experimental evidence that a hydrophobic mismatch can lead to protein aggregation in fluid bilayer were founded. Electron microscopy studies on bacteriorhodopsin, reconstituted in saturated and unsaturated fluid PC bilayers with varying chain length, showed that protein aggregation occurred only with a rather large mismatch, and that bilayer thicknesses of 4 angstrom thicker and 10 angstrom thinner than the estimated hydrophobic thickness of the protein are allowed without induction of significant aggregation.

=== Helix tilt ===
Tilt is also a possible result if the hydrophobic part of a peptide or protein is too long to span the membrane. A previous study on lactose permease of E. coli showed that upon reconstitution of the protein in PE/PG (3/1) lipid bilayer, an increase in helix tilt occurs at increasing protein content. This tilt was accompanied by a decrease in lipid order, which results in a decrease in bilayer thickness, suggesting that it is a mismatch related response. In large proteins that span the membrane multiple times, changes in helical tilt may occur with little effect on lipid packing. However, for a single transmembrane helix, it is possible that a tilt would cause a strain on the surrounding lipids to accommodate the helix in the bilayer. Thus, a large degree of tilting can be a less favorable option for single transmembrane proteins.

=== Surface orientation ===
Relatively small hydrophobic peptides may not be able to integrate into the membrane, and in response adopt an orientation at the membrane surface. The experimental evidence was shown by a fluorescence study on an artificial peptide with a 19 amino acid long hydrophobic sequence of mainly leucines and flanked on both sides with lysines as anchoring residues. The results indicated that a conversion from a dominant transmembrane to parallel orientation of the peptide could be induced by modulating bilayer thickness via addition of cholesterol or by increasing lipid chain length.

=== Backbone conformation change ===
To obtain detailed information on the consequences of mismatch for the conformation of peptides and proteins in lipid bilayer, small membrane-spanning peptides are most suitable. Still need some studies.

== Theories for the mismatch effects ==
Different theoretical approaches have been applied to describe the energy cost and thermodynamic effects of mismatch, including treatment of the membrane as an elastic sheet or a microscopic approach.

=== Mattress model ===
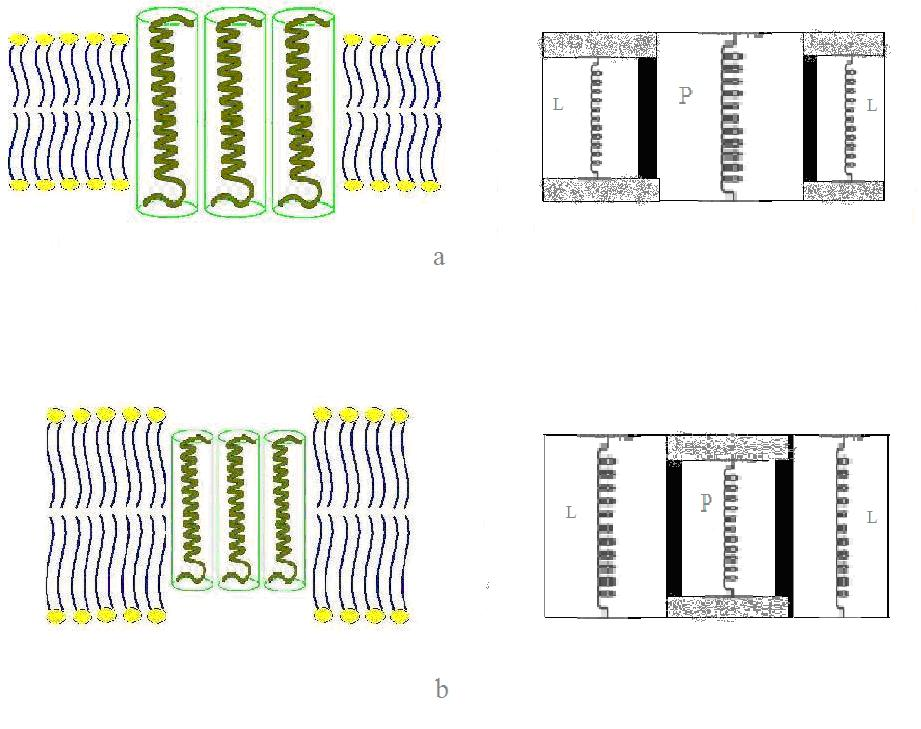
Mattress model

Mattress model was proposed as a phenomenological theory approach in 1984 by Mouritsen and Bloom. It is a two-component real solution theory based on the theory of nonideal solutions and hence allows for phase separation. In their model, they relate the energy stored in the undulations of the membrane surface caused by the mismatch to the elastic properties of the lipids and proteins. They do not include microscopic detail of the lipids, but use as input the known thermodynamic properties of the pure lipid system. They also include indirect lipid-protein interactions induced by the mismatch as well as direct lipid-protein van der Waals-like interactions between the hydrophobic parts of the lipid bilayer and the proteins. The excess "hydrophobic effect" associated with the lipid-protein hydrophobic mismatch, and the elastic deformation free energy of the lipid chains near the protein. The interaction potentials are estimated based on experimental data derived from thermodynamic and mechanical measurements of membrane properties.

=== Monte Carlo simulation scheme ===
The mattress model was later replicated in a Monte Carlo simulation scheme by Sperotto and Mouritsen. They allowed for different microstates of the lipids, classified according to Pink’s 10-state model. hence enabling a pure lipid bilayer phase transition. This version of the model provides a connection between the microscopic characteristics of the system and its thermodynamic behavior.

=== Molecular theory ===
In a molecular theory of the lipid chains of the membrane, peptides, with their hydrophobic length, were treated as providing a boundary condition on the configuration of the lipid chains. A molecular modeling was combined with phenomenological free energy contributions describing lipid head group repulsion and membrane solvent surface tension. Duque et al.

== Experimental studies of hydrophobic mismatch and helix tilt ==
Knowledge of the response of membrane proteins to mismatch has been obtained from a variety of experimental studies. Different types of experimental approaches provide different kinds of insight into the contributions from the abovementioned hypothetical molecular responses. For example, proteins or peptides outfitted with fluorescent or paramagnetic labeling groups can be employed in fluorescence spectroscopy and electron spin resonance studies. These can reveal the molecular details of both the protein-lipid interactions and protein-protein interactions (characteristic of an aggregation-style response) and how they are affecting by (mis)match conditions. Studies of helix tilting as a function of membrane thickness have also benefited from the use of solid-state NMR techniques, in particular using oriented membranes that provide direct insight into the helix tilt angle. Early studies of model membrane-spanning peptides (such as the WALP peptide) have provided insight into the various factors that influence the response, including membrane composition, peptide sequence and in particular also the presence of interfacial anchoring residues. In recent years, great advances in X-ray crystallography and electron microscopy techniques have yielded new insights of the lipid interactions of larger proteins. This is exemplified by the insights into helix tilting in a crystallized calcium pump protein.

== Biological significance of mismatch ==
The hydrophobic mismatch is important for the protein sorting and formation of lipid rafts.

=== Protein sorting ===
In eukaryotic cells, the level of cholesterol increases through the secretory pathway, from the endoplasmic reticulum to the Golgi to the plasma membrane, suggesting a concomitant increase in membrane thickness. In line with this, the average length of transmembrane segment of single-span plasma membrane proteins typically is five amino acids longer than the average length of proteins from the Golgi. Experimental evidence was obtained that protein sorting in the Golgi may be based on this length difference: for several proteins that normally reside in the Golgi, it was shown that increasing their hydrophobic length can reroute the proteins to the plasma membrane, or vice versa, that decreasing the hydrophobic length of proteins from the plasma membrane can cause their retention in the Golgi.

=== Lipid rafts ===
Rafts are membrane domains enriched in cholesterol, sphingomyelin (SM), and certain membrane proteins. Rafts have putative roles in many physiological processes, such as signal transduction, endocytosis, apoptosis, protein trafficking, and lipid regulation. Raft lipids typically have saturated hydrocarbon chains. Lipid rafts have a higher hydrophobic thickness than the rest of the lipid bilayer, which may lead to a preferential separation of transmembrane proteins with a higher hydrophobic thickness into the lipid rafts.

== See also ==
- Hydrophobicity scales
- Cell membrane
- Lipid raft
