= Stephen H. White =

Physiology & Biophysics researcher, academic

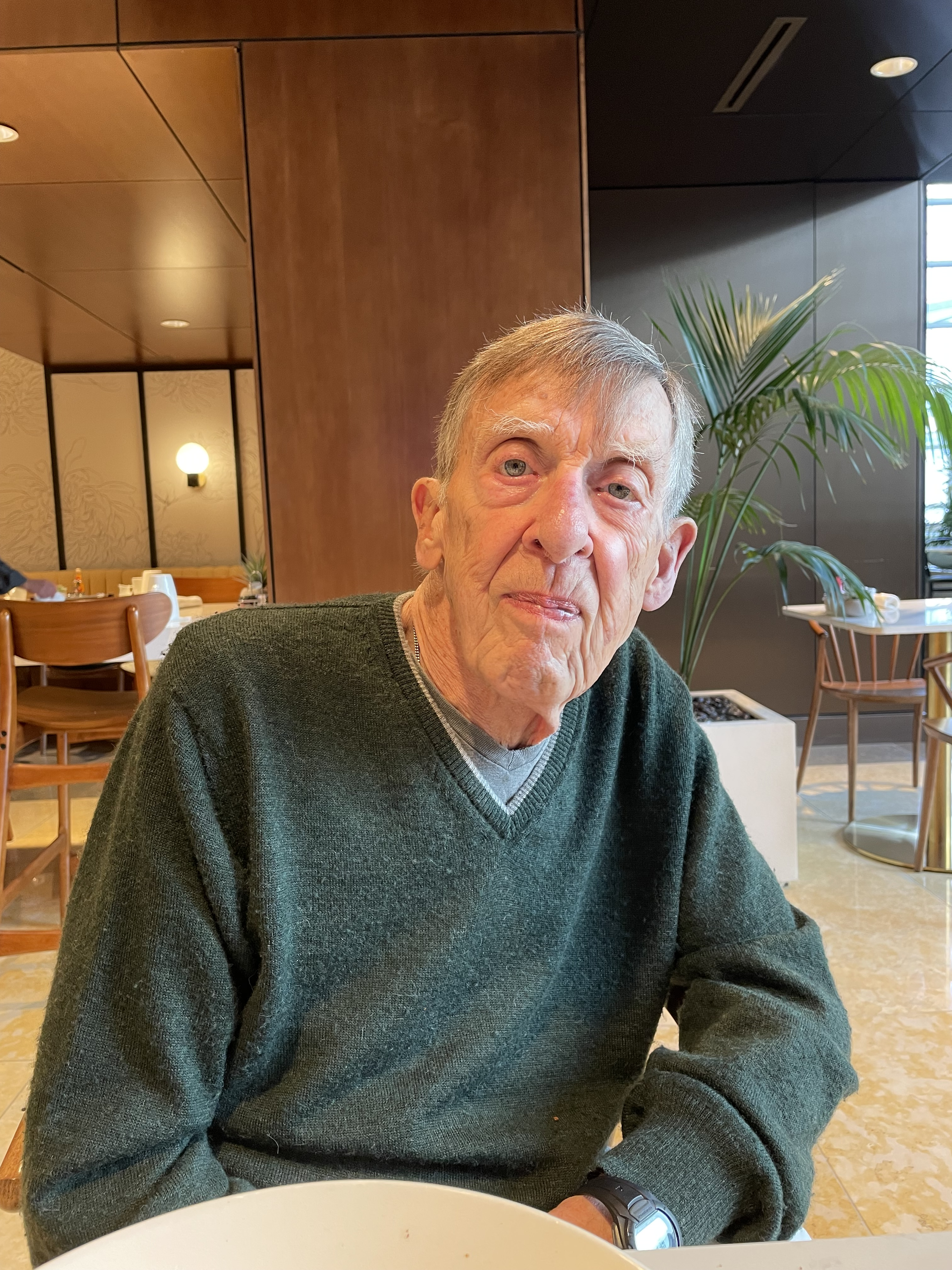
- White in 2023
- Born: May 1940; Wewoka, Oklahoma, United States
- Died: 31 May 2026 (aged 86); San Clemente, California, U.S.
- Occupations: Biophysicist, academic, and author
- Children: 6
- Awards: Distinguished Service Award, Biophysical Society; Avanti Award in Lipids, Biophysical Society; Fellow, Biophysical Society; Carl Brändén Award, The Protein Society; Fellow, Neutron Scattering Society of America; Fellow, American Association for the Advancement of Science

Academic background
- Education: University of Colorado; University of Washington

Academic work
- Institutions: University of California, Irvine School of Medicine

Stephen H. White was an American Biophysicist, academic, and author. He was a Professor Emeritus of Physiology and Biophysics at the University of California, Irvine School of Medicine.

White published over 350 papers, was cited over 30,000 times, and had a Google Scholar H-index of 84. He focused his research on structure and folding of membrane proteins, with particular attention on protein structure prediction, peptide–bilayer interactions, cell membrane biophysics, structure of membranes and lipid bilayers, and antimicrobial peptides. He was awarded the 2014 Carl Brändén Award for his contributions to the field of membrane protein folding. He authored several book chapters and two books entitled, Membrane Protein Structure: Experimental Approaches and Cell Boundaries: How Membranes and Their Proteins Work.

White was a Fellow of the American Association for the Advancement of Science, Neutron Scattering Society of America, and Biophysical Society, where he also served as President (1996-1997). He served on numerous advisory boards of several professional organizations, including NIH, NSF, Department of Energy, and European Science Foundation.

== Early life and education ==
White was born in Wewoka, Oklahoma, in May 1940. White earned an amateur radio license at age 13 and a commercial Second-Class Radiotelephone License at the age of 17. He enrolled at the University of Colorado, eventually majoring in physics. After his graduation in 1963, he enrolled at the University of Washington, and received a master's degree in physics in 1965 under H.G. Dehmelt (Department of Physics) on the radio frequency spectrum of the H_{2}^{+} ion. In 1969, he earned his doctoral degree in physiology and biophysics for his work planar lipid bilayers in the lab of J. Walter Woodbury.

Prior to completing his postdoctoral studies at the University of Virginia in 1972, White served two years in the U.S. Army to the rank of captain.

== Career ==
White began his academic career as an assistant professor in what is now the department of physiology and biophysics at the University of California, Irvine in 1972. He was promoted to associate professor in 1975, and to professor in 1979. He became professor emeritus in 2012. During his tenure at UCI, he also held concurrent appointments at Brookhaven National Laboratories as guest associate physiologist till 1983, and as guest biophysicist till 1996. He also served as a guest scientist at NIST Center for Neutron Research since 2001.

White was appointed vice-chair in the department of physiology and biophysics at UCI from 1974 till 1975, and as chair from 1977 till 1989. In this role, he hired several other faculty, and helped launch their careers.

== Research ==
In his research, White focused on membrane protein folding and stability, energetics of protein-bilayer interactions, experimentally determined hydrophobicity scales, translocon-assisted folding of membrane proteins, structure of fluid lipid bilayers, and MD simulations of lipid bilayers. His experimental expertise included X-ray diffraction, neutron diffraction, molecular dynamics simulations, calorimetry, physical chemistry, surface chemistry, statistical analysis of protein sequences, electrical impedance methods, planar bilayer methodology, peptide chemistry, and lipid chemistry.

White’s lab determined the first fully resolved structure of a fluid lipid bilayer by combining x-ray and neutron diffraction data, and subsequently validated molecular dynamics simulations of fluid bilayers. White wrote a critical review of the principles of membrane folding and stability in 1999 that is among the ten most cited articles in Annual Review of Biophysics. Using a thermodynamic framework, he highlighted three main aspects of membrane protein folding energetics: protein binding and folding in bilayer interfaces, transmembrane helix insertion, and helix-helix interactions. In his paper “Mechanisms of Integral Membrane Protein Insertion and Folding” written in collaboration with Gunnar von Heijne, he evaluated the progress made during the past decade toward understanding translocon-assisted folding of membrane proteins and reviewed the role of basic thermodynamic principles in MP folding and assembly. In 2005, he introduced an algorithm for computing the absolute partitioning free energies of unfolded peptides into the phosphatidylcholine bilayer interface. In his studies, he also described how partitioning of membrane-active oligopeptides into membrane interfaces plays a significant role in terms of promoting the formation of secondary structure. Focusing on the partitioning of two series of small model peptides into the interfaces of neutral (zwitterionic) phospholipid membranes, he determined a complete interfacial hydrophobicity scale that includes the contribution of the peptide bond. His study with von Heijne based on the recognition of transmembrane helices by the endoplasmic reticulum translocon introduced a new dimension to the problem of predicting transmembrane helices from amino acid sequences, as well as showing that direct protein–lipid interactions are critical during translocon-mediated membrane insertion.

White studied the preference of tryptophan and tyrosine residues for membrane interfaces as significant features of membrane proteins. He explored several possibilities for tryptophan's interfacial preference. Most recently, his lab developed methods for studying membrane protein biogenesis and folding in E. coli using chimeric single-span membrane proteins.

White was part of a consortium of scientists that developed a comprehensive classification system for lipids.

== Awards and honors ==
- 1976–1981 - N.I.H. Research Career Development Award
- 1975, 1992 - Kaiser Permanente Award for Excellence in Teaching
- 1996–1997 - President, Biophysical Society
- 1997 - Distinguished Lecturer, Beckman Center, University of Illinois at Urbana-Champaign
- 1999 - Distinguished Service Award, Biophysical Society
- 2000 - Athalie Clarke Research Achievement Award, Outstanding Researcher, UCI College of Medicine
- 2001 - Fellow, Biophysical Society
- 2002 - César Milstein Plenary Lecture, XIVth International Biophysics Congress
- 2006 - Keynote Lecture, Gordon Research Conference on Biopolymers
- 2008 - Ph.D. honoris causa, Stockholm University
- 2009 - Avanti Award in Lipids, Biophysical Society
- 2009 - Bioengineering Distinguished Speaker, University of California at Riverside
- 2010 - Matrone Distinguished Lecture in Biochemistry, North Carolina State University
- 2010 - Cátedra de Investigación Científica, Autonomous University of San Luis Potosí
- 2010 - Frederic M. Richards Lecture, Yale
- 2011 - O'Malley Lectures in Chemical Biology, Boston College
- 2014 - Carl Brändén Award, The Protein Society
- 2016 - Fellow, Neutron Scattering Society of America
- 2018 - Fellow, American Association for the Advancement of Science
- 2019 - University of Kansas Newmark Award Lecture
- 2022 - UCI School of Medicine, Lifetime Research Achievement Award for Excellence in Basic Science research.

== Bibliography ==
=== Books ===
- Membrane Protein Structure: Experimental Approaches (1994) ISBN 9780195071122
- Cell Boundaries: How Membranes and Their Proteins Work (2021) ISBN 9781000508536

=== Selected articles ===
- White, S. H. (1986). The physical nature of planar bilayer membranes. In Ion Channel Reconstitution (Chris Miller, Ed.). Plenum Press: New York. pp. 3–35.
- Wiener, M. C. and White, S. H. (1992). The structure of a fluid dioleoylphosphatidylcholine bilayer determined by joint refinement using x-ray and neutron diffraction data. III. The complete structure. Biophys. J. 61:434–447.
- White, S. H., Wimley, W. C., Ladokhin, A. S., and Hristova, K. (1998). Protein folding in membranes: Determining the energetics of peptide–bilayer interactions. Methods Enzymol. 295:62–87.
- White, S. H. and Wimley, W. C. (1999). Membrane protein folding and stability: Physical principles. Annu. Rev. Biophys. Biomolec. Struct. 28:319–365
- Hessa, T., Meindl-Beinker, N. M., Bernsel, A., Kim, H., Sato, Y., Lerch, M. B., Nilsson, I., White, S. H., and von Heijne, G. (2007). The molecular code for transmembrane-helix recognition by the Sec61 translocon. Nature 450:1026-1030.
- Cymer, F., von Heijne, G., & White S.H. (2015). Mechanisms of integral membrane protein insertion and folding. J Mol Biol 427:999-1022.
- Roussel, G., Lindner, E., & White, S. H. (2022). Topology of the SecA ATPase Bound to Large Unilamellar Vesicles. Journal of Molecular Biology, 434(12), 167607.
