= Potassium channel opener =

Type of drug

A potassium channel opener is a type of drug which facilitates ion transmission through potassium channels.

== Examples ==
Some examples include:

- K_{ATP} channel openers
  - Diazoxide vasodilator used for hypertension, smooth muscle relaxing activity
  - Minoxidil vasodilator used for hypertension, also used to treat hair loss
  - Nicorandil vasodilator used to treat angina
  - Pinacidil
- KCNQ (K_{v}7) channel openers
  - Flupirtine, analgesic with muscle relaxant and anticonvulsant properties
  - Retigabine (ezogabine), an anticonvulsant

Class	Subclasses	Activators
Calcium-activated 6T & 1P	BK channel; SK channel; IK channel	1-EBIO; NS309; CyPPA; BK_{Ca}-specific: Flufenamic acid; Meclofenamic acid; Niflumic acid; Nimesulide; Rottlerin (mallotoxin); Tolfenamic acid
Inwardly rectifying 2T & 1P	ROMK (K_{ir}1.1)	None
Inwardly rectifying 2T & 1P	GPCR regulated (K_{ir}3.x)	GPCR agonists; ML-297 (VU0456810)
Inwardly rectifying 2T & 1P	ATP-sensitive (K_{ir}6.x)	Aprikalim; Bimakalim; Cromakalim; Diazoxide; Emakalim; Levcromakalim; Mazokalim; Minoxidil; Naminidil; Nicorandil; Pinacidil; Rilmakalim; Sarakalim
Tandem pore domain 4T & 2P	TWIK (TWIK-1, TWIK-2, KCNK7); TREK (TREK-1, TREK-2, TRAAK); TASK (TASK-1, TASK-3, TASK-5); TALK (TASK-2, TALK-1, TALK-2); THIK (THIK-1, THIK-2); TRESK	Halothane; Riluzole; Arachidonic acid
Voltage-gated 6T & 1P	hERG (K_{v}11.1); KvLQT1 (K_{v}7.1)	KCNQ (K_{v}7)-specific: Flupirtine; Retigabine (ezogabine); Azetukalner (encukalner); Pynegabine; Opakalim; CB03-154; Fluoxakalner

== See also ==
- Potassium channel
- Potassium channel blocker
