= Potassium channel =

Ion channel that selectively passes K+

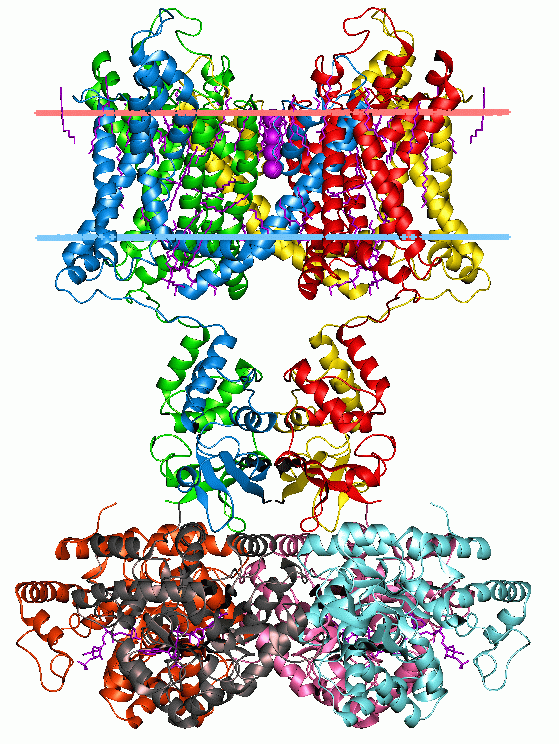
Potassium channel Kv1.2, structure in a membrane-like environment. Calculated hydrocarbon boundaries of the lipid bilayer are indicated by red and blue lines.

Potassium channels are the most widely distributed type of ion channel found in virtually all organisms. They form potassium-selective pores that span cell membranes. Potassium channels are found in most cell types and control a wide variety of cell functions.

== Function ==
Potassium channels function to conduct potassium ions down their electrochemical gradient, doing so both rapidly (up to the diffusion rate of K^{+} ions in bulk water) and selectively (excluding, most notably, sodium despite the sub-angstrom difference in ionic radius). Biologically, these channels act to set or reset the resting potential in many cells. In excitable cells, such as neurons, the delayed counterflow of potassium ions shapes the action potential.

By contributing to the regulation of the cardiac action potential duration in cardiac muscle, malfunction of potassium channels may cause life-threatening arrhythmias. Potassium channels may also be involved in maintaining vascular tone.

They also regulate cellular processes such as the secretion of hormones (e.g., insulin release from beta-cells in the pancreas) so their malfunction can lead to diseases (such as diabetes).

Some toxins, such as dendrotoxin, are potent because they block potassium channels.

== Types ==
There are four major classes of potassium channels:

- Calcium-activated potassium channel – open in response to the presence of calcium ions or other signalling molecules.
- Inwardly rectifying potassium channel – passes current (positive charge) more easily in the inward direction (into the cell).
- Tandem pore domain potassium channel – are constitutively open or possess high basal activation, such as the "resting potassium channels" or "leak channels" that set the negative membrane potential of neurons.
- Voltage-gated potassium channel – are voltage-gated ion channels that open or close in response to changes in the transmembrane voltage.

The following table contains a comparison of the major classes of potassium channels with representative examples (for a complete list of channels within each class, see the respective class pages):

Potassium channel classes, function, and pharmacology.
Class	Subclasses	Function	Blockers	Activators
Calcium-activated; 6T & 1P	BK channel; SK channel; IK channel	inhibition in response to rising intracellular calcium	Charybdotoxin, Iberiotoxin; Apamin; Some types of dendrotoxin from mamba snake venom, BK_{Ca}-specific; GAL-021; Ethanol (alcohol)	1-EBIO; NS309; CyPPA; BK_{Ca}-specific: Flufenamic acid; Meclofenamic acid; Niflumic acid; Nimesulide; Rottlerin (mallotoxin); Tolfenamic acid
Inwardly rectifying 2T & 1P	ROMK (K_{ir}1.1)	recycling and secretion of potassium in nephrons	Nonselective: Ba^{2+}, Cs^{+}	
Inwardly rectifying 2T & 1P	Voltage-gated (K_{ir}2.x)	final repolarization phase and stabilising the resting potential of the action potential in cardiac myocytes	Chloroquine; Pentamidine; ML133; Fluoxetine; Nortryptiline; Dronedarone; Quinidine	Flecainide
Inwardly rectifying 2T & 1P	GPCR regulated (K_{ir}3.x)	mediate the inhibitory effect of many GPCRs	Ifenprodil; Cloperastine; Tertiapin; Tipepidine; Ba^{2+}	ML-297 (VU0456810)
Inwardly rectifying 2T & 1P	ATP-sensitive (K_{ir}6.x)	close when ATP is high to promote insulin secretion	Acetohexamide; Carbutamide; Chlorpropamide; Glibenclamide (glyburide); Glibornuride; Glicaramide; Gliclazide; Glimepiride; Glipizide	Bimakalim; Cromakalim; Diazoxide; Levcromakalim; Minoxidil; Nicorandil; Pinacidil
Tandem pore domain 4T & 2P	TWIK (TWIK-1, TWIK-2, KCNK7); TREK (TREK-1, TREK-2, TRAAK); TASK (TASK-1, TASK-3, TASK-5); TALK (TASK-2, TALK-1, TALK-2); THIK (THIK-1, THIK-2); TRESK	Contribute to resting potential	bupivacaine; quinidine; 12-O-Tetradecanoylphorbol-13-acetate; Arachidonic acid; Fluoxetine; Norfluoxetine; Modulated by GPCR agonists and antagonists, No selective blockers,	halothane; Riluzole; Volatile anaesthetics, e.g. Isoflurane; Modulated by GPCR agonists and antagonists,
Voltage-gated; 6T & 1P	hERG (K_{v}11.1); KvLQT1 (K_{v}7.1)	action potential repolarization; limits frequency of action potentials (disturbances cause dysrhythmia)	3,4-Diaminopyridine (amifampridine); 4-Aminopyridine (fampridine/dalfampridine); Bretylium; Tetraethylammonium; hERG (KCNH2, K_{v}11.1)-specific: Ajmaline; Amiodarone; AmmTX3; KCNQ (K_{v}7)-specific: Linopirdine; Ssm spooky toxin	KCNQ (K_{v}7)-specific: Flupirtine; Retigabine (K_{v}7)

== Structure ==
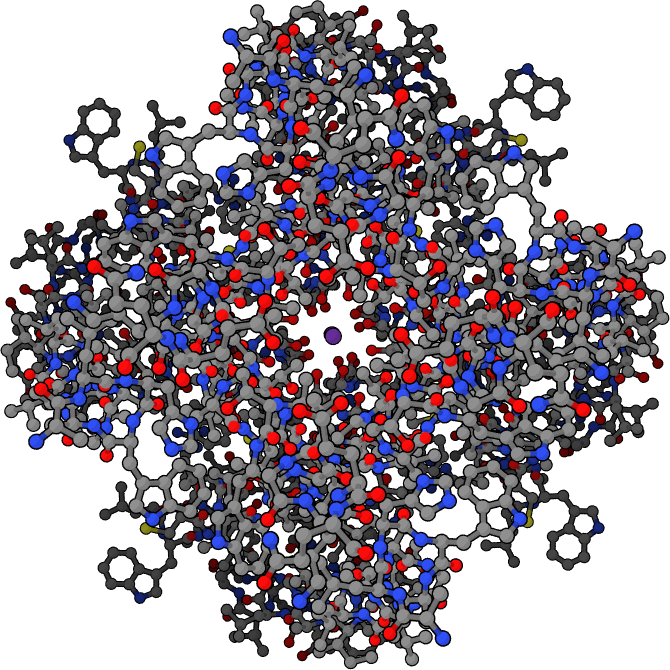
Top view of a potassium channel with potassium ions (purple) moving through the pore (in the center). (PDB: 1BL8)

Potassium channels have a tetrameric structure in which four identical protein subunits associate to form a fourfold symmetric (C_{4}) complex arranged around a central ion conducting pore (i.e., a homotetramer). Alternatively four related but not identical protein subunits may associate to form heterotetrameric complexes with pseudo C_{4} symmetry. All potassium channel subunits have a distinctive pore-loop structure that lines the top of the pore and is responsible for potassium selective permeability.

There are over 80 mammalian genes that encode potassium channel subunits. However potassium channels found in bacteria are amongst the most studied of ion channels, in terms of their molecular structure. Using X-ray crystallography, profound insights have been gained into how potassium ions pass through these channels and why (smaller) sodium ions do not. The 2003 Nobel Prize for Chemistry was awarded to Rod MacKinnon for his pioneering work in this area.

=== Selectivity filter ===
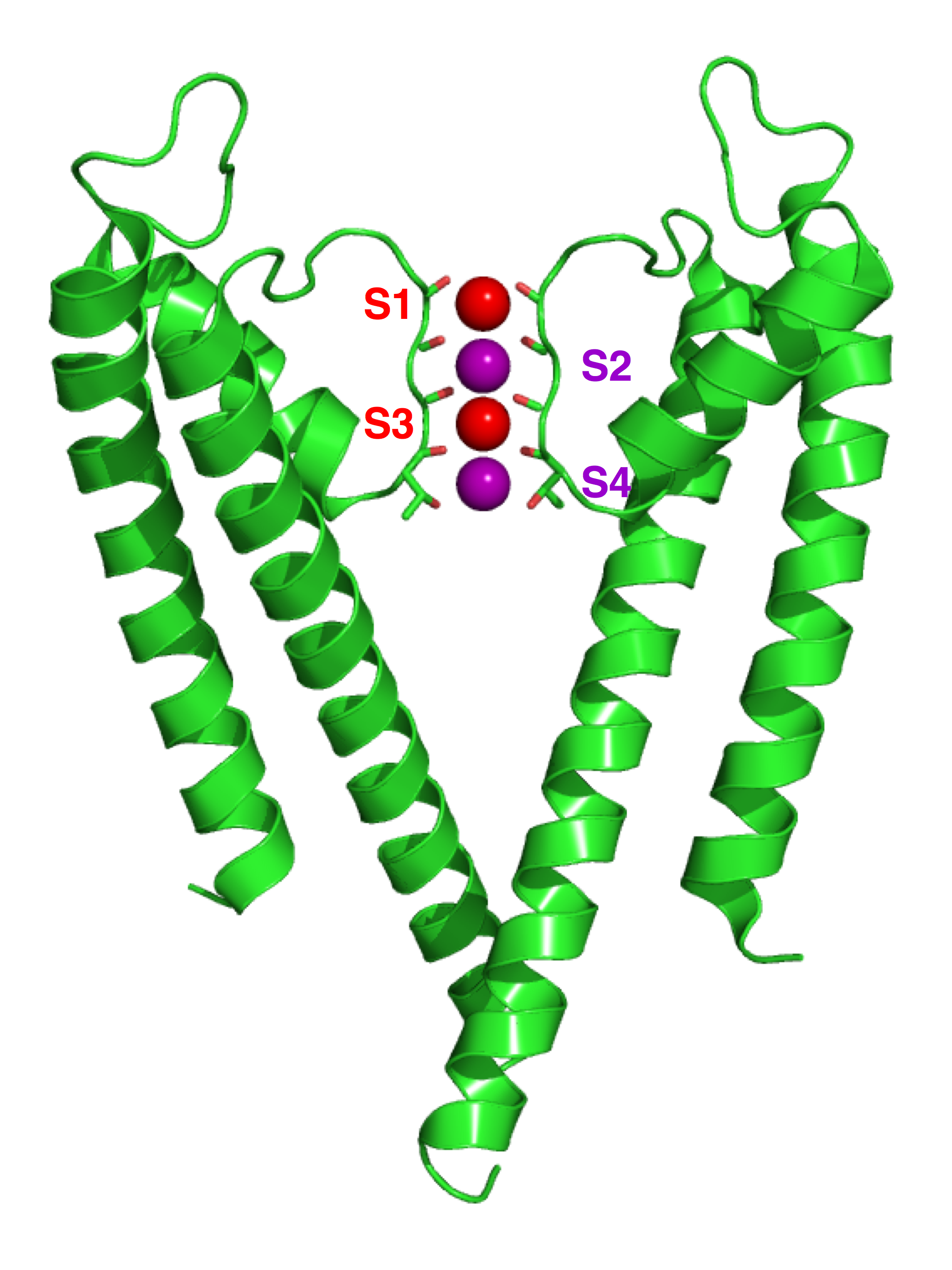
Crystallographic structure of the bacterial KcsA potassium channel (PDB: 1K4C). In this figure, only two of the four subunits of the tetramer are displayed for the sake of clarity. The protein is displayed as a green cartoon diagram. In addition backbone carbonyl groups and threonine sidechain protein atoms (oxygen = red, carbon = green) are displayed. Finally potassium ions (occupying the S2 and S4 sites) and the oxygen atoms of water molecules (S1 and S3) are depicted as purple and red spheres respectively.

Potassium ion channels remove the hydration shell from the ion when it enters the selectivity filter. The selectivity filter is formed by a five residue sequence, TVGYG, termed the signature sequence, within each of the four subunits. This signature sequence is within a loop between the pore helix and TM2/6, historically termed the P-loop. This signature sequence is highly conserved, with the exception that a valine residue in prokaryotic potassium channels is often substituted with an isoleucine residue in eukaryotic channels. This sequence adopts a unique main chain structure, structurally analogous to a nest protein structural motif. The four sets of electronegative carbonyl oxygen atoms are aligned toward the center of the filter pore and form a square antiprism similar to a water-solvating shell around each potassium binding site. The distance between the carbonyl oxygens and potassium ions in the binding sites of the selectivity filter is the same as between water oxygens in the first hydration shell and a potassium ion in water solution, providing an energetically-favorable route for de-solvation of the ions. Sodium ions, however, are too small to fill the space between the carbonyl oxygen atoms. Thus, it is energetically favorable for sodium ions to remain bound with water molecules in the extracellular space, rather than to pass through the potassium-selective ion pore. This width appears to be maintained by hydrogen bonding and van der Waals forces within a sheet of aromatic amino acid residues surrounding the selectivity filter. The selectivity filter opens towards the extracellular solution, exposing four carbonyl oxygens in a glycine residue (Gly79 in KcsA). The next residue toward the extracellular side of the protein is the negatively charged Asp80 (KcsA). This residue together with the five filter residues form the pore that connects the water-filled cavity in the center of the protein with the extracellular solution.

==== Selectivity mechanism ====
The mechanism of potassium channel selectivity remains under continued debate. The carbonyl oxygens are strongly electro-negative and cation-attractive. The filter can accommodate potassium ions at 4 sites usually labelled S1 to S4 starting at the extracellular side. In addition, one ion can bind in the cavity at a site called SC or one or more ions at the extracellular side at more or less well-defined sites called S0 or Sext. Several different occupancies of these sites are possible. Since the X-ray structures are averages over many molecules, it is, however, not possible to deduce the actual occupancies directly from such a structure. In general, there is some disadvantage due to electrostatic repulsion to have two neighboring sites occupied by ions. Proposals for the mechanism of selectivity have been made based on molecular dynamics simulations, toy models of ion binding, thermodynamic calculations, topological considerations, and structural differences between selective and non-selective channels.

The mechanism for ion translocation in KcsA has been studied extensively by theoretical calculations and simulation. The prediction of an ion conduction mechanism in which the two doubly occupied states (S1, S3) and (S2, S4) play an essential role has been affirmed by both techniques. Molecular dynamics (MD) simulations suggest the two extracellular states, S_{ext} and S_{0}, reflecting ions entering and leaving the filter, also are important actors in ion conduction.

=== Hydrophobic region ===
This region neutralizes the environment around the potassium ion so that it is not attracted to any charges. In turn, it speeds up the reaction.

=== Central cavity ===
A central pore, 10 Å wide, is located near the center of the transmembrane channel, where the energy barrier is highest for the transversing ion due to the hydrophobity of the channel wall. The water-filled cavity and the polar C-terminus of the pore helices ease the energetic barrier for the ion. Repulsion by preceding multiple potassium ions is thought to aid the throughput of the ions. The presence of the cavity can be understood intuitively as one of the channel's mechanisms for overcoming the dielectric barrier, or repulsion by the low-dielectric membrane, by keeping the K^{+} ion in a watery, high-dielectric environment.

== Regulation ==
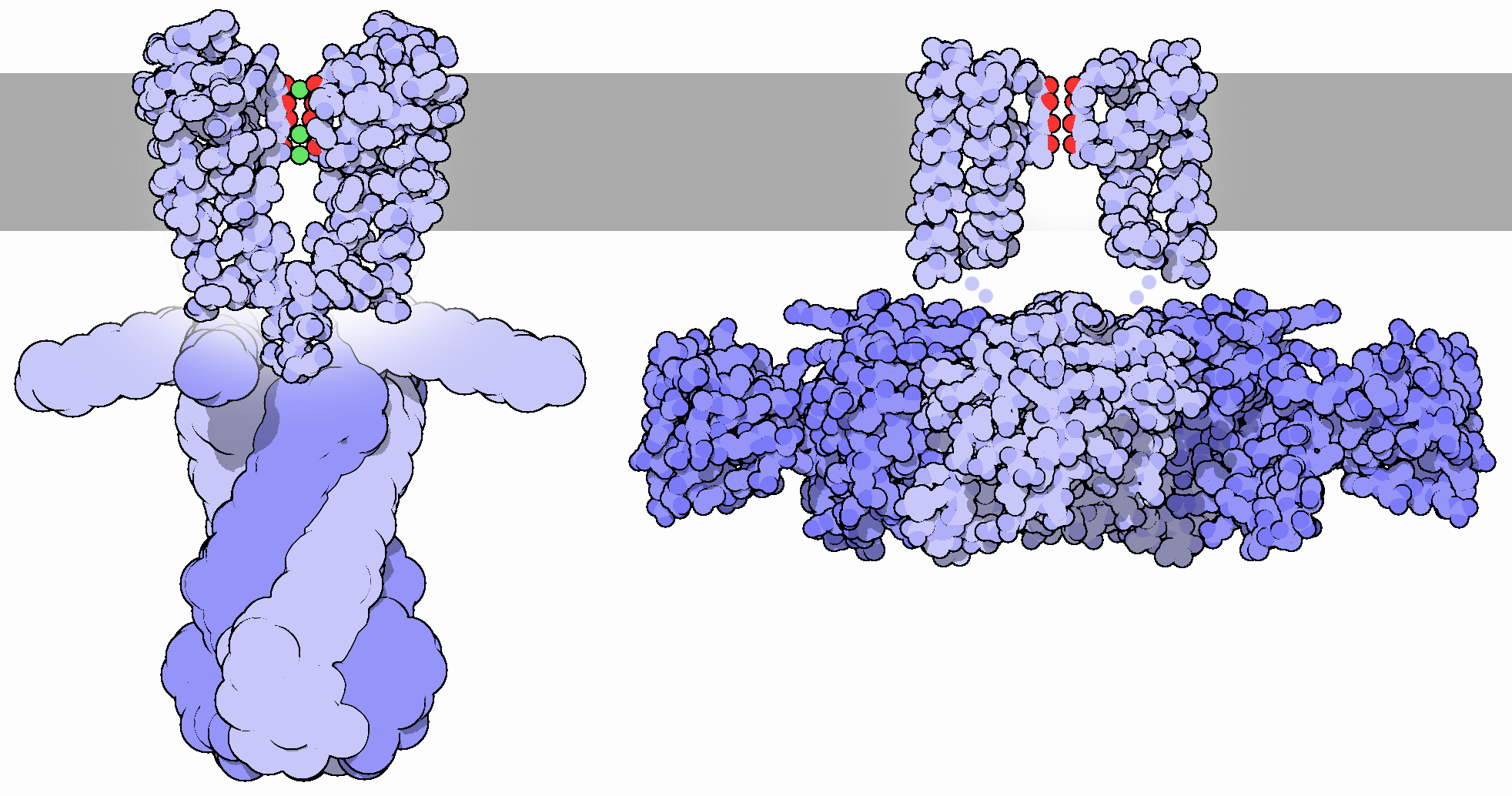
Graphical representation of open and shut potassium channels (PDB: 1lnq and PDB: 1k4c). Two simple bacterial channels are shown to compare the "open" channel structure on the right with the "closed" structure on the left. At top is the filter (selects potassium ions), and at bottom is the gating domain (controls opening and closing of channel).

The flux of ions through the potassium channel pore is regulated by two related processes, termed gating and inactivation. Gating is the opening or closing of the channel in response to stimuli, while inactivation is the rapid cessation of current from an open potassium channel and the suppression of the channel's ability to resume conducting. While both processes serve to regulate channel conductance, each process may be mediated by a number of mechanisms.

Generally, gating is thought to be mediated by additional structural domains which sense stimuli and in turn open the channel pore. These domains include the RCK domains of BK channels, and voltage sensor domains of voltage gated K^{+} channels. These domains are thought to respond to the stimuli by physically opening the intracellular gate of the pore domain, thereby allowing potassium ions to traverse the membrane. Some channels have multiple regulatory domains or accessory proteins, which can act to modulate the response to stimulus. While the mechanisms continue to be debated, there are known structures of a number of these regulatory domains, including RCK domains of prokaryotic and eukaryotic channels, pH gating domain of KcsA, cyclic nucleotide gating domains, and voltage gated potassium channels.

N-type inactivation is typically the faster inactivation mechanism, and is termed the "ball and chain" model. N-type inactivation involves interaction of the N-terminus of the channel, or an associated protein, which interacts with the pore domain and occludes the ion conduction pathway like a "ball". Alternatively, C-type inactivation is thought to occur within the selectivity filter itself, where structural changes within the filter render it non-conductive. There are a number of structural models of C-type inactivated K^{+} channel filters, although the precise mechanism remains unclear.

== Pharmacology ==
=== Blockers ===
Potassium channel blockers inhibit the flow of potassium ions through the channel. They either compete with potassium binding within the selectivity filter or bind outside the filter to occlude ion conduction. An example of one of these competitors is quaternary ammonium ions, which bind at the extracellular face or central cavity of the channel. For blocking from the central cavity quaternary ammonium ions are also known as open channel blockers, as binding classically requires the prior opening of the cytoplasmic gate.

Barium ions can also block potassium channel currents, by binding with high affinity within the selectivity filter. This tight binding is thought to underlie barium toxicity by inhibiting potassium channel activity in excitable cells.

Medically potassium channel blockers, such as 4-aminopyridine and 3,4-diaminopyridine, have been investigated for the treatment of conditions such as multiple sclerosis and KCNA2-related disorders. Off target drug effects can lead to drug induced Long QT syndrome, a potentially life-threatening condition. This is most frequently due to action on the hERG potassium channel in the heart. Accordingly, all new drugs are preclinically tested for cardiac safety.

== Muscarinic potassium channel ==
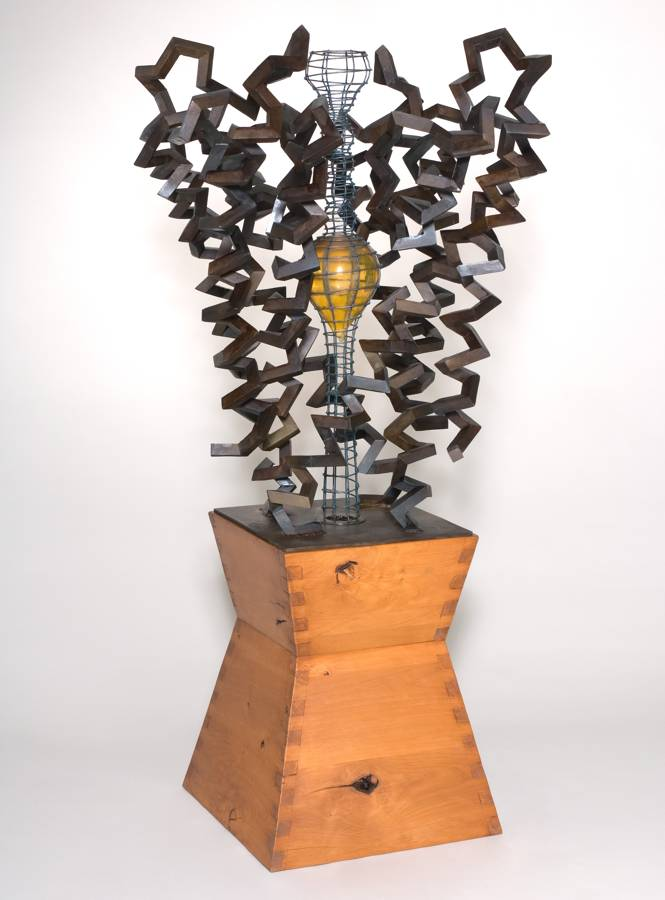
Birth of an Idea (2007) by Julian Voss-Andreae. The sculpture was commissioned by Roderick MacKinnon based on the molecule's atomic coordinates that were determined by MacKinnon's group in 2001.

Some types of potassium channels are activated by muscarinic receptors and these are called muscarinic potassium channels (I_{KACh}). These channels are a heterotetramer composed of two GIRK1 and two GIRK4 subunits. Examples are potassium channels in the heart, which, when activated by parasympathetic signals through M2 muscarinic receptors, cause an outward current of potassium, which slows down the heart rate.

== In fine art ==
Roderick MacKinnon commissioned Birth of an Idea, a 5-foot (1.5 m) tall sculpture based on the KcsA potassium channel. The artwork contains a wire object representing the channel's interior with a blown glass object representing the main cavity of the channel structure.

== See also ==
- Calcium channel – Ion channel complex through which calcium ions pass
- Inward-rectifier potassium ion channel – Group of transmembrane proteins that passively transport potassium ions
- Potassium in biology
- Potassium transporter (Trk) family – Family of transport proteins
- Potassium uptake permease
- Sodium ion channel – Transmembrane protein allowing sodium ions in and out
