= Hydroxy-α-sanshool =

Names
- Preferred IUPAC name (2E,6Z,8E,10E)-N-(2-Hydroxy-2-methylpropyl)dodeca-2,6,8,10-tetraenamide
- Other names Hydroxy-α-sanshool

Identifiers
CAS Number	83883-10-7
3D model (JSmol)	Interactive image
ChEBI	CHEBI:172306
ChEMBL	ChEMBL1084610
ChemSpider	39144022
PubChem CID	10084135
CompTox Dashboard (EPA)	DTXSID20700212
- InChI: InChI=1S/C16H25NO2/c1-4-5-6-7-8-9-10-11-12-13-15(18)17-14-16(2,3)19/h4-9,12-13,19H,10-11,14H2,1-3H3,(H,17,18)/b5-4+,7-6+,9-8-,13-12+ Key: LHFKHAVGGJJQFF-UEOYEZOQSA-N
- SMILES: CC=CC=CC=CCCC=CC(=O)NCC(C)(C)O

Properties
Chemical formula	C_{16}H_{25}NO_{2}
Molar mass	263.381 g·mol^{−1}
- Except where otherwise noted, data are given for materials in their standard state (at 25 °C [77 °F], 100 kPa). Infobox references

Hydroxy-α-sanshool (/-sænʃoʊ.ɒl/), also known as simply sanshool is a molecule found in plants from the genus Zanthoxylum. It is believed to be responsible for the numbing and tingling sensation caused by eating food cooked with Sichuan peppercorns and Uzazi.

The term sanshool in the compound's name is derived from the Japanese term for the Japanese pepper, sanshō (山椒) (lit. 'mountain pepper'), to which was appended the suffix -ol, indicating an alcohol.

== Mechanism ==
The chemical structure of hydroxy-alpha-sanshool resembles capsaicin as both are fatty acid amides, but the mechanism of action by which it induces nerve sensations has been a matter of debate. Like capsaicin, hydroxy-alpha-sanshool is an agonist at the pain integration channels TRPV1 and TRPA1; however, evidence suggests that the inhibition of tandem pore domain potassium channels KCNK3, KCNK9, and KCNK18 are primarily responsible for sanshool's effects.

Hydroxy-alpha-sanshool excites D-hair afferent nerve fibers, a distinct subset of the sensitive light touch receptors in the skin, and targets novel populations of Aβ and C-fiber nerve fibers.

== Extraction ==
To isolate the molecule from the pepper in form of an extract, steam distillation can be used: Dried peels of the fruit are immersed in a mixture of lower alcohols (for example ethanol) and water with a mass percentage between 35% and 65% of the alcohol. The solution is heated up in the process of steam distillation, where the aqueous part evaporates and takes parts of the hydroxy-alpha-sanshool up as well.

The distillate separates in two phases: the aqueous ethanol phase and the oil phase which contains the desired molecule.

Steam distillation extraction methods demonstrate yields of approximately 60%.

== See also ==
- Spilanthol
