= Kalium Database =

Scientific database

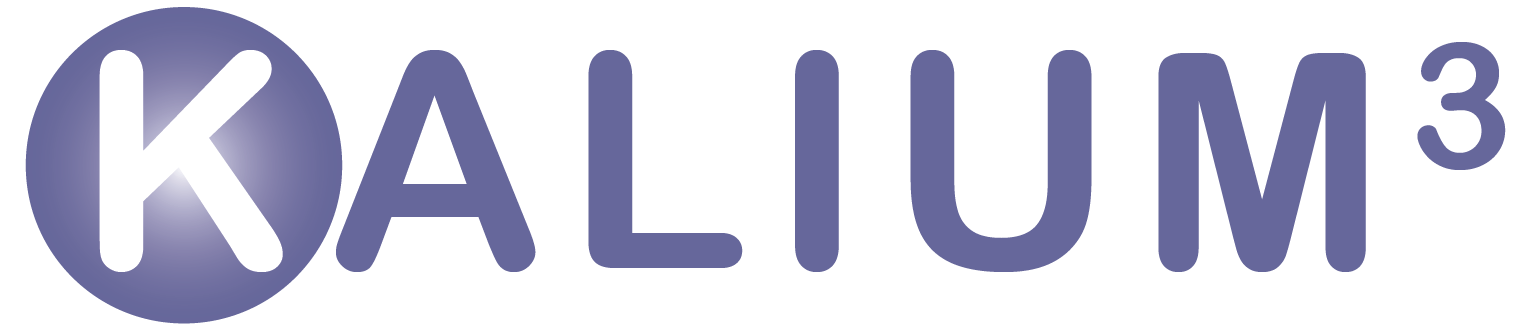
- Website type: Biomedical database
- Available in: English
- Founded: Russian Academy of Sciences, Moscow, Russia
- Creators: Alexey I. Kuzmenkov; Nikolay A. Krylov; Daria A. Yureva; Valentin M. Tabakmakher; Anton O. Chugunov; Alexander A. Vassilevski
- Website: kaliumdb.org
- Launched: April 16, 2016; 10 years ago
- Current status: Active

The Kalium Database is a manually curated biomedical database on K^{+} channel ligands found in the venom of scorpions, spiders, sea anemones, cone snails, snakes, centipedes, bees, and more. The first release of the Kalium Database was dedicated to scorpion toxins only, while its second release (Kalium 2.0) included toxins from other living organisms. The most recent update (Kalium 3.0) added information on their artificial derivatives. The Kalium Database is meant to assist structural biologists, toxicologists, pharmacologists, medicinal chemists, and other researchers in their pursuit to develop new drugs for cardiovascular and neurological diseases.
