= KCNK13 =

Protein-coding gene in the species Homo sapiens

Identifiers
- Aliases: KCNK13, K2p13.1, THIK-1, THIK1, potassium two pore domain channel subfamily K member 13
- External IDs: OMIM: 607367; MGI: 2384976; GeneCards: KCNK13

Gene location (Human)
Chr.	Chromosome 14 (human)
Band	14q32.11	Start	90,061,994 bp
Band	14q32.11	End	90,185,853 bp

Gene location (Mouse)
Chr.	Chromosome 12 (mouse)
Band	12|12 E	Start	99,930,758 bp
Band	12|12 E	End	100,028,941 bp
RNA expression pattern
Bgee	Human / Mouse (ortholog); Top expressed in: right testis; left testis; monocyte; granulocyte; appendix; human kidney; right auricle of heart; left lobe of thyroid gland; prefrontal cortex; right lobe of thyroid gland / Top expressed in: secondary oocyte; stroma of bone marrow; primary oocyte; zygote; embryo; left lung lobe; superior frontal gyrus; deep cerebellar nuclei; dentate gyrus of hippocampal formation granule cell; primary visual cortex; More reference expression data
BioGPS	n/a
Gene ontology
Molecular function	potassium channel activity; voltage-gated ion channel activity; potassium ion leak channel activity
Cellular component	integral component of membrane; plasma membrane; membrane; integral component of plasma membrane
Biological process	potassium ion transport; regulation of ion transmembrane transport; ion transport; stabilization of membrane potential; potassium ion transmembrane transport
Sources:Amigo / QuickGO
Orthologs
Databases	NCBI: entry; OMA: entry
Species	Human	Mouse
Entrez	56659	217826
Ensembl	ENSG00000152315	ENSMUSG00000045404
UniProt	Q9HB14	Q8R1P5
RefSeq (mRNA)	NM_022054	NM_001164426; NM_001164427; NM_146037
RefSeq (protein)	NP_071337	NP_001157898; NP_001157899; NP_666149
Location (UCSC)	Chr 14: 90.06 – 90.19 Mb	Chr 12: 99.93 – 100.03 Mb
PubMed search
- Wikidata
View/Edit Human	View/Edit Mouse

Potassium channel, subfamily K, member 13 (KCNK13), also known as K_{2P}13.1 or THIK-1, is a protein that in humans is encoded by the KCNK13 gene. It is a potassium channel containing two pore-forming P domains.

== Function ==
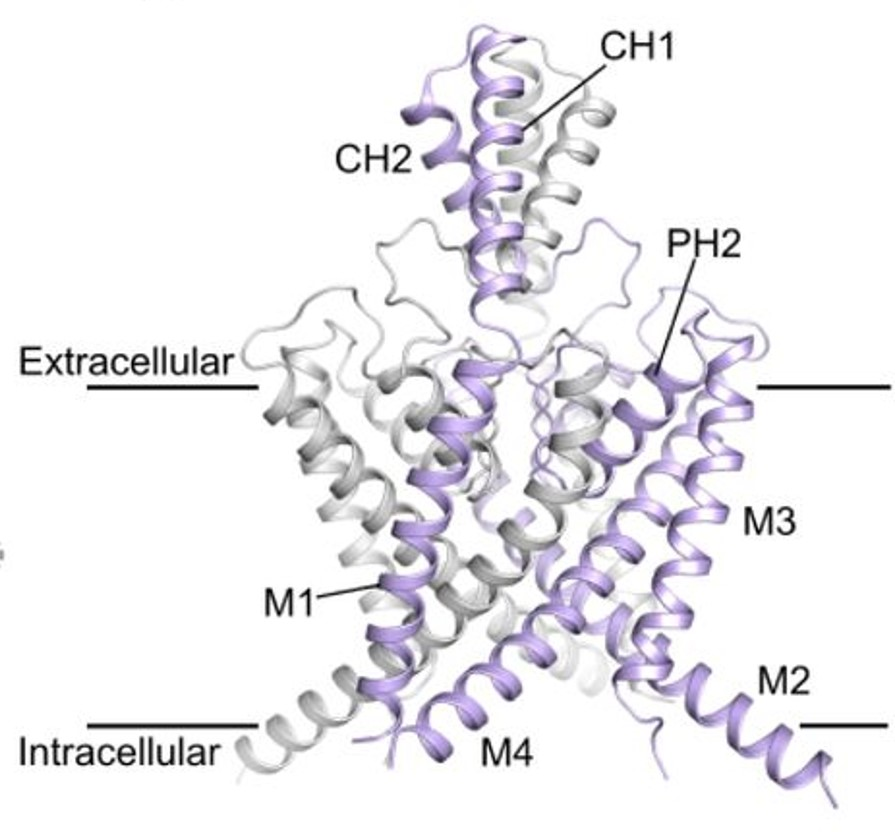
Ribbon structure of homodimeric two-pore potassium channel K2P13 (THIK-1).

K_{2P}13.1 was first discovered in 2000 from a rat cDNA library, along with the closely related protein K_{2P}12.1 The two channels were named tandem pore domain halothane-inhibited K^{+} channel 1 and 2 (THIK-1 and THIK-2) because the anesthetic halothane inhibited the potassium current. THIK-1 was also shown to be activated by arachidonic acid and displayed mild voltage dependence, with moderate outward rectification at low external K^{+} and weak inward rectification with nearly symmetrical K^{+} concentrations. Later research showed that THIK-1 can be activated by G-protein-coupled receptor pathways and by polyanionic lipids such as PIP_{2} and oleoyl-CoA.

In humans, THIK-1 expression is almost exclusively restricted to microglia, where it functions as the main potassium channel and is responsible for maintaining their resting membrane potential through tonic background potassium conductance. THIK-1 activity can regulate microglial ramification, surveillance, NLRP3 inflammasome activation, and subsequent release of pro-inflammatory cytokine interleukin-1β (IL-1β). It also plays a role in cell shrinkage during apoptosis via caspase-8 cleavage.

== See also ==
- Tandem pore domain potassium channel
