= C17H14N2O2 =

The molecular formula C_{17}H_{14}N_{2}O_{2} (molar mass: 278.305 g/mol, exact mass: 278.1055 u) may refer to:

- Bimakalim
- Sudan Red G
