= C15H19N5 =

The molecular formula C_{15}H_{19}N_{5} (molar mass: 269.352 g/mol) may refer to:

- Rizatriptan
- Naminidil
