= CB03-154 =

Clinical data
- Other names: CB-03; CB03; CB-003; CB003
- Routes of administration: Oral
- Drug class: K_{v}7.2 and K_{v}7.3 potassium channel opener

Identifiers
- IUPAC name: N-[2-(4-fluorophenyl)-5,7-dimethyl-3,4-dihydro-1H-isoquinolin-6-yl]-2-(1-methylcyclopropyl)acetamide
- PubChem CID: 163592364

Chemical and physical data
- Formula: C_{23}H_{27}FN_{2}O
- Molar mass: 366.480 g·mol^{−1}
- 3D model (JSmol): Interactive image
- SMILES: CC1=CC2=C(CCN(C2)C3=CC=C(C=C3)F)C(=C1NC(=O)CC4(CC4)C)C
- InChI: InChI=1S/C23H27FN2O/c1-15-12-17-14-26(19-6-4-18(24)5-7-19)11-8-20(17)16(2)22(15)25-21(27)13-23(3)9-10-23/h4-7,12H,8-11,13-14H2,1-3H3,(H,25,27); Key:GQOKKEDNOCHTOP-UHFFFAOYSA-N

CB03-154 is a K_{v}7.2 and K_{v}7.3 potassium channel opener which is under development for the treatment of amyotrophic lateral sclerosis (ALS), epilepsy, major depressive disorder, bipolar disorders, stroke, and pain in China. It is taken orally. The drug is said to have higher selectivity and stability compared to retigabine. CB03-154 is under development by Shanghai Zhimeng Biopharma. As of November 2025, it is in 2/3 clinical trials for ALS, phase 2 trials for epilepsy and major depressive disorder, phase 1 trials for bipolar disorders, and the preclinical research stage of development for stroke, whereas no recent development has been reported for pain.

== See also ==
- List of investigational antidepressants
- List of investigational bipolar disorder drugs
