= Naminidil =

Clinical data
- Other names: BMS-234303; BMS234303
- Routes of administration: Topical
- Drug class: ATP-sensitive potassium channel opener; Vasodilator
- ATC code: None

Identifiers
- IUPAC name: 1-cyano-3-(4-cyanophenyl)-2-[(2R)-3,3-dimethylbutan-2-yl]guanidine
- CAS Number: 220641-11-2
- PubChem CID: 158438
- ChemSpider: 139379
- UNII: 7K50VT05OD
- KEGG: D05114
- ChEMBL: ChEMBL2105160
- CompTox Dashboard (EPA): DTXSID00176552

Chemical and physical data
- Formula: C_{15}H_{19}N_{5}
- Molar mass: 269.352 g·mol^{−1}
- 3D model (JSmol): Interactive image
- SMILES: C[C@H](C(C)(C)C)N=C(NC#N)NC1=CC=C(C=C1)C#N
- InChI: InChI=1S/C15H19N5/c1-11(15(2,3)4)19-14(18-10-17)20-13-7-5-12(9-16)6-8-13/h5-8,11H,1-4H3,(H2,18,19,20)/t11-/m1/s1; Key:PGYDRGZVXVVZQC-LLVKDONJSA-N

Naminidil (INN, USAN; developmental code name BMS-234303) is an ATP-sensitive potassium channel opener with vasodilator activity which was under development as a topical medication for the treatment of androgenic alopecia (pattern hair loss) but was never marketed. The drug was under development by Bristol-Myers Squibb and reached phase 2 clinical trials by 2001. One of the phase 2 trials compared naminidil, minoxidil, and placebo for alopecia. However, no results of the study appear to have been made available. Development of naminidil was discontinued by 2008. In terms of chemical structure, naminidil is a guanidine derivative and is structurally distinct from minoxidil.

== Synthesis ==
Although patented versions of the synthesis exist (c.f. Lednicer book), the earliest recorded synthesis is for the racemic compound and dates back to 1992.

== See also ==
- List of investigational hair loss drugs
- ATP-sensitive potassium channel § Stimulation of hair growth
