= Rottlerin =

Chemical compound

Clinical data
- Other names: Mallotoxin

Identifiers
- IUPAC name: (E)-1-[6-[(3-acetyl-2,4,6-trihydroxy-5-methylphenyl)methyl]-5,7-dihydroxy-2,2-dimethylchromen-8-yl]-3-phenylprop-2-en-1-one
- CAS Number: 82-08-6
- PubChem CID: 5281847
- IUPHAR/BPS: 2611
- ChemSpider: 4445144
- UNII: E29LP3ZMUH
- KEGG: C10721
- ChEBI: CHEBI:8899
- ChEMBL: ChEMBL34241
- CompTox Dashboard (EPA): DTXSID30231502
- ECHA InfoCard: 100.001.270

Chemical and physical data
- Formula: C_{30}H_{28}O_{8}
- Molar mass: 516.546 g·mol^{−1}
- 3D model (JSmol): Interactive image
- SMILES: O=C(c1c(O)c(c(O)c(c1O)C)Cc3c(O)c(C(=O)\C=C\c2ccccc2)c4OC(/C=C\c4c3O)(C)C)C
- InChI: InChI=1S/C30H28O8/c1-15-24(33)19(27(36)22(16(2)31)25(15)34)14-20-26(35)18-12-13-30(3,4)38-29(18)23(28(20)37)21(32)11-10-17-8-6-5-7-9-17/h5-13,33-37H,14H2,1-4H3/b11-10+; Key:DEZFNHCVIZBHBI-ZHACJKMWSA-N

Rottlerin (mallotoxin) is a polyphenol natural product isolated from the Asian tree Mallotus philippensis. Rottlerin displays a complex spectrum of pharmacology.

== Effects ==
=== Uncoupler of oxidative phosphorylation ===
Rottlerin has been shown to be an uncoupler of mitochondrial oxidative phosphorylation.

=== Potassium channel opener ===
Rottlerin is a potent large conductance potassium channel (BKCa++) opener. BKCa++ is found in the inner mitochondrial membrane of cardiomyocytes. Opening these channels is beneficial for post-ischemic changes in vasodilation. Other BKCa++ channel openers are reported to limit the mitochondrial calcium overload due to ischemia. Rottlerin is also capable of reducing oxygen radical formation.

Other BKCa++ channel openers (NS1619, NS11021 and DiCl-DHAA) have been reported to have cardio-protective effects after ischemic-reperfusion injury. There were reductions in mitochondrial Ca++ overload, mitochondrial depolarization, increased cell viability and improved function in the whole heart.

Mallotoxin is also a hERG potassium channel activator.

=== Role in cardioplegia reperfusion ===
Clements et al. reported that rottlerin improves the recovery of isolated rat hearts perfused with buffer after cold cardioplegic arrest. A majority of patients recover but some develop a cardiac low-output syndrome attributable in part to depressed left ventricular or atrial contractility, which increases chance of death.

=== Contractility and vascular effects ===
Rottlerin increases in isolated heart contractility independent of its vascular effects, as well as enhanced perfusion through vasomotor activity. The activation of BKCa++ channels by rottlerin relaxes coronary smooth muscle and improves myocardial perfusion after cardioplegia.

Myocardial stunning is associated with oxidant radical damage and calcium overload. Contractile abnormalities can occur through oxidant-dependent damage and also through calcium overload in the mitochondria resulting in mitochondrial damage. BKCa++ channels reside in the inner mitochondrial membrane and their activation is proposed to increase K+ accumulation in mitochondria. This limits Ca^{2+} influx into mitochondria, reducing mitochondrial depolarization and permeability transition pore opening. This may result in less mitochondrial damage and therefore greater contractility since there is a decrease in apoptosis compared to no stimulation of BKCa++ channels.

=== Akt activation ===
Rottlerin also enhances the cardioplegia-induced phosphorylation of Akt on the activation residue Thr308. Akt activation modulates mitochondrial depolarization and the permeability transition pore. Clements et al. found that Akt functions downstream of the BKCa++ channels and its activation is considered beneficial after ischemic-reperfusion injury. It is unclear what the specific role of Akt may play in modulating of myocardial function after rottlerin treatment of cardioplegia. More research needs to be done to examine if Akt is necessary to improve cardiac function when rottlerin is administered.

=== Antioxidant properties ===
The antioxidant properties of rottlerin have been demonstrated but it is unclear whether the effects are because of BKCa++ channel opening or an additional mechanism of rottlerin. There was no oxygen dependent damage found by rottlerin in the study conducted by Clements et al.

== Ineffective PKCδ selective inhibitor ==
Rottlerin has been reported to be a PKCδ inhibitor. PKCδ has been implicated in depressing cardiac function and cell death after ischemia-reperfusion injury as well as promoting vascular smooth muscle contraction and decreasing perfusion. However, the role of rottlerin as a specific PKCδ inhibitor has been questioned. There have been several studies using rottlerin as a PKCδ selective inhibitor based on in vitro studies, but some studies showed it did not block PKCδ activity and did block other kinase and non-kinase proteins in vitro. Rottlerin also uncouples mitochondria at high doses and results in depolarization of the mitochondrial membrane potential. It was found to reduce ATP levels, activate 5'-AMP-activated protein kinase and affect mitochondrial production of reactive oxygen species (ROS). It is difficult to say that rottlerin is a selective inhibitor of PKCδ since there are biological and biochemical processes that are PKCδ –independent that may affect outcomes. A proposed mechanism of why rottlerin was found to inhibit PKCδ is that it decreased ATP levels and can block PKCδ tyrosine phosphorylation and activation.

== Sources ==
The Kamala tree, also known as Mallotus philippensis, grows in Southeast Asia. The fruit of this tree is covered with a red powder called kamala, and is used locally to make dye for textiles, syrup and used as an old remedy for tape-worm, because it has a laxative effect. Other uses include afflictions with the skin, eye diseases, bronchitis, abdominal disease, and spleen enlargement but scientific evidence is not present.
