= KCNK10 =

Protein-coding gene in the species Homo sapiens

Identifiers
- Aliases: KCNK10, K2p10.1, PPP1R97, TREK-2, TREK2, potassium two pore domain channel subfamily K member 10
- External IDs: OMIM: 605873; MGI: 1919508; GeneCards: KCNK10
Available structures
PDB	Human UniProt search: PDBe RCSB
PDB	List of PDB id codes 4BW5, 4XDJ, 4XDK, 4XDL

Gene location (Human)
Chr.	Chromosome 14 (human)
Band	14q31.3	Start	88,180,103 bp
Band	14q31.3	End	88,326,907 bp

Gene location (Mouse)
Chr.	Chromosome 12 (mouse)
Band	12|12 E	Start	98,395,696 bp
Band	12|12 E	End	98,544,569 bp
RNA expression pattern
Bgee	Human / Mouse (ortholog); Top expressed in: cerebellar vermis; pons; ventricular zone; Brodmann area 23; superior vestibular nucleus; ventral tegmental area; jejunal mucosa; dorsal motor nucleus of vagus nerve; parietal lobe; inferior olivary nucleus / Top expressed in: ventricular zone; spermatocyte; lumbar spinal ganglion; ganglionic eminence; medial ganglionic eminence; cerebellar cortex; neural tube; trigeminal ganglion; mesencephalon; lobe of cerebellum; More reference expression data
BioGPS	n/a
Gene ontology
Molecular function	potassium channel activity; voltage-gated ion channel activity; potassium ion leak channel activity
Cellular component	integral component of membrane; plasma membrane; membrane; integral component of plasma membrane
Biological process	potassium ion transport; regulation of ion transmembrane transport; memory; ion transport; signal transduction; stabilization of membrane potential; potassium ion transmembrane transport
Sources:Amigo / QuickGO
Orthologs
Databases	NCBI: entry; OMA: entry
Species	Human	Mouse
Entrez	54207	72258
Ensembl	ENSG00000100433	ENSMUSG00000033854
UniProt	P57789	n/a
RefSeq (mRNA)	NM_021161; NM_138317; NM_138318	NM_029911; NM_001316664; NM_001316665; NM_001316666
RefSeq (protein)	NP_066984; NP_612190; NP_612191	n/a
Location (UCSC)	Chr 14: 88.18 – 88.33 Mb	Chr 12: 98.4 – 98.54 Mb
PubMed search
- Wikidata
View/Edit Human	View/Edit Mouse

Potassium channel, subfamily K, member 10, also known as KCNK10, is a human gene. The protein encoded by this gene, K_{2P}10.1, is a potassium channel containing two pore-forming P domains.

== See also ==
- Tandem pore domain potassium channel
