= KCNK7 =

Protein-coding gene in the species Homo sapiens

Identifiers
- Aliases: KCNK7, K2p7.1, TWIK3, potassium two pore domain channel subfamily K member 7
- External IDs: OMIM: 603940; MGI: 1341841; GeneCards: KCNK7

Gene location (Human)
Chr.	Chromosome 11 (human)
Band	11q13.1	Start	65,592,836 bp
Band	11q13.1	End	65,595,996 bp

Gene location (Mouse)
Chr.	Chromosome 19 (mouse)
Band	19|19 A	Start	5,754,395 bp
Band	19|19 A	End	5,757,137 bp
RNA expression pattern
Bgee	Human / Mouse (ortholog); Top expressed in: skin of abdomen; skin of leg; skin of arm; human penis; nipple; vulva; gingival epithelium; skin of thigh; skin of hip; vagina / Top expressed in: lip; esophagus; skin of external ear; embryo; granulocyte; embryo; embryo; ganglion cell layer; hair follicle; skin of back; More reference expression data
BioGPS	n/a
Gene ontology
Molecular function	potassium channel activity; voltage-gated ion channel activity; potassium ion leak channel activity
Cellular component	integral component of membrane; plasma membrane; membrane; integral component of plasma membrane
Biological process	potassium ion transport; regulation of ion transmembrane transport; ion transport; stabilization of membrane potential; potassium ion transmembrane transport
Sources:Amigo / QuickGO
Orthologs
Databases	NCBI: entry; OMA: entry
Species	Human	Mouse
Entrez	10089	16530
Ensembl	ENSG00000173338	ENSMUSG00000024936
UniProt	Q9Y2U2	Q9Z2T1
RefSeq (mRNA)	NM_033456; NM_005714; NM_033347; NM_033348; NM_033455	NM_001004138; NM_010609
RefSeq (protein)	NP_005705; NP_203133; NP_203134; NP_258416	NP_034739
Location (UCSC)	Chr 11: 65.59 – 65.6 Mb	Chr 19: 5.75 – 5.76 Mb
PubMed search
- Wikidata
View/Edit Human	View/Edit Mouse

Potassium channel, subfamily K, member 7, also known as KCNK7 or K_{2P}7.1 is a protein which is encoded in humans by the KCNK7 gene. K_{2P}7.1 is a potassium channel containing two pore-forming P domains. Multiple transcript variants encoding different isoforms have been found for this gene.

== Function ==
This gene encodes a member of the superfamily of potassium channel proteins containing two pore-forming P domains. The product of this gene has not been shown to be a functional channel; It may require other non-pore-forming proteins for activity.

== See also ==
- Tandem pore domain potassium channel
