= Delta12-fatty-acid desaturase =

Identifiers
- EC no.: 1.14.19.6

Databases
- IntEnz: IntEnz view
- BRENDA: BRENDA entry
- ExPASy: NiceZyme view
- KEGG: KEGG entry
- MetaCyc: metabolic pathway
- PRIAM: profile
- PDB structures: RCSB PDB PDBe PDBsum
Search
- PMC: articles
- PubMed: articles
- NCBI: proteins

Delta12-fatty-acid desaturase (EC 1.14.19.6, Delta12 fatty acid desaturase, Delta12(omega6)-desaturase, oleoyl-CoA Delta12 desaturase, Delta12 desaturase, Delta12-desaturase) is an enzyme with systematic name acyl-CoA,hydrogen donor:oxygen Delta12-oxidoreductase. This enzyme catalyses the following chemical reaction

acyl-CoA + reduced acceptor + O_{2} $\rightleftharpoons$ Delta12-acyl-CoA + acceptor + 2 H_{2}O

In the yeast Lipomyces starkeyi and in the American cockroach, this microsomal enzyme converts oleoyl-CoA into linoleoyl-CoA.
