= Nicorandil =

Chemical compound

Clinical data
- Trade names: Ikorel, others
- AHFS/Drugs.com: International Drug Names
- Pregnancy category: AU: B3
- Routes of administration: By mouth
- ATC code: C01DX16 (WHO)

Legal status
- Legal status: AU: S4 (Prescription only); UK: POM (Prescription only)

Pharmacokinetic data
- Bioavailability: 75 to 80%
- Protein binding: 25%
- Metabolism: Liver
- Elimination half-life: 1 hour
- Excretion: Kidney (21%)

Identifiers
- IUPAC name: 2-[(pyridin-3-ylcarbonyl)amino]ethyl nitrate
- CAS Number: 65141-46-0
- PubChem CID: 47528
- IUPHAR/BPS: 2411
- DrugBank: DB09220
- ChemSpider: 43240
- UNII: 260456HAM0
- KEGG: D01810
- ChEBI: CHEBI:31905
- ChEMBL: ChEMBL284906
- CompTox Dashboard (EPA): DTXSID8045692
- ECHA InfoCard: 100.059.541

Chemical and physical data
- Formula: C_{8}H_{9}N_{3}O_{4}
- Molar mass: 211.177 g·mol^{−1}
- 3D model (JSmol): Interactive image
- SMILES: O=C(NCCO[N+]([O-])=O)c1cccnc1
- InChI: InChI=1S/C8H9N3O4/c12-8(7-2-1-3-9-6-7)10-4-5-15-11(13)14/h1-3,6H,4-5H2,(H,10,12); Key:LBHIOVVIQHSOQN-UHFFFAOYSA-N

Nicorandil is a vasodilator drug used to treat angina, which is chest pain that results from episodes of transient myocardial ischemia. Angina can be caused by diseases such as atherosclerosis, coronary artery disease, and aortic stenosis.

It was patented in 1976 and approved for medical use in 1983.

== Side effects ==
Side effects listed in the British National Formulary include flushing, palpitations, weakness and vomiting. More recently, perianal, ileal, and peristomal ulceration has been reported as a side effect. Anal ulceration is now included in the British National Formulary as a reported side effect. Other side effects include severe migraine, toothache, and nasal congestion.

== Mechanism of action ==
Nicorandil is an anti-angina medication that has the dual properties of a nitrate and ATP-sensitive K^{+} channel opener. In humans, the nitrate action of nicorandil dilates the large coronary arteries at low plasma concentrations. At high plasma concentrations nicorandil reduces coronary vascular resistance, which is associated with increased ATP-sensitive K+ channel (K_{ATP}) opening.

Nicorandil stimulates guanylate cyclase to increase formation of cyclic GMP (cGMP). cGMP activates protein kinase G (PKG), which phosphorylates and inhibits GTPase RhoA and decreases Rho-kinase activity. Reduced Rho-kinase activity permits an increase in myosin phosphatase activity, decreasing the calcium sensitivity of the smooth muscle.

PKG also activates the sarcolemma calcium pump to remove activating calcium. PKG acts on K^{+} channels to promote K+ efflux and the ensuing hyperpolarization inhibits voltage-gated calcium channels. Overall, this leads to relaxation of the smooth muscle and coronary vasodilation.

The effect of nicorandil as a vasodilator is mainly attributed to its nitrate property. Yet, nicorandil is effective in cases where nitrates, such as nitroglycerine, are not effective. Studies show that this is due to its K_{ATP} channel agonist action which causes pharmacological preconditioning and provides cardioprotective effects against ischemia. Nicorandil activates K_{ATP} channels in the mitochondria of the myocardium, which appears to relay the cardioprotective effects, although the mechanism is still unclear. In experimental animal models of the Long QT syndrome, Nicorandil normalizes the prolonged cardiac action potential duration and the QT interval.

== Synthesis ==
Thieme Synthesis (original) patents:

Amide reaction between Nicotinoyl Chloride [10400-19-8] & 2-Aminoethyl Nitrate [646-02-6].

Revised patents:

The reaction of N-(2-Hydroxyethyl)Nicotinamide [6265-73-2] with nitric acid gives nicorandil.

== Names ==
=== Brand names ===
Nicorandil is marketed under the brand names Ikorel (in the United Kingdom, Australia and most of Europe), Cordinic (in Russia), Angedil (in Romania, Poland), Dancor (in Switzerland), Nikoran, PCA (in India), Aprior (in the Philippines), Nitorubin (in Japan), and Sigmart (in Japan, South Korea, Taiwan and China). Nicorandil is not available in the United States.
