= KCNK4 =

Protein-coding gene in the species Homo sapiens

Identifiers
- Aliases: KCNK4, K2p4.1, TRAAK, TRAAK1, potassium two pore domain channel subfamily K member 4, FHEIG
- External IDs: OMIM: 605720; MGI: 1298234; GeneCards: KCNK4
Available structures
PDB	Ortholog search: PDBe RCSB
PDB	List of PDB id codes 3UM7, 4I9W, 4RUE, 4RUF, 4WFE, 4WFF, 4WFG, 4WFH

Gene location (Human)
Chr.	Chromosome 11 (human)
Band	11q13.1	Start	64,291,302 bp
Band	11q13.1	End	64,300,031 bp

Gene location (Mouse)
Chr.	Chromosome 19 (mouse)
Band	19 A|19 5.08 cM	Start	6,901,334 bp
Band	19 A|19 5.08 cM	End	6,911,883 bp
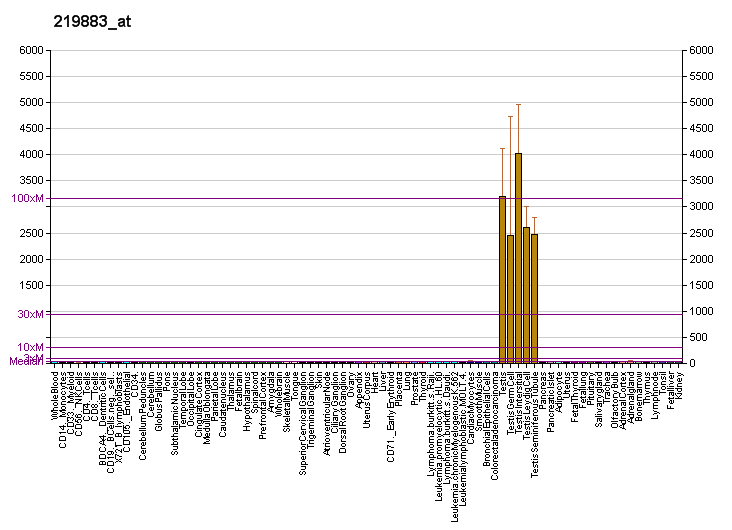
RNA expression pattern
Bgee	Human / Mouse (ortholog); Top expressed in: nucleus accumbens; temporal lobe; amygdala; hippocampus proper; superior frontal gyrus; prefrontal cortex; anterior cingulate cortex; right frontal lobe; dorsolateral prefrontal cortex; caudate nucleus / Top expressed in: primary visual cortex; morula; superior frontal gyrus; dentate gyrus of hippocampal formation granule cell; lip; entorhinal cortex; intestinal villus; esophagus; Ileal epithelium; CA3 field; More reference expression data
BioGPS	More reference expression data
Gene ontology
Molecular function	potassium channel activity; mechanosensitived potassium channel activity; voltage-gated ion channel activity; temperature-gated cation channel activity; potassium ion leak channel activity; identical protein binding
Cellular component	integral component of membrane; membrane; plasma membrane; integral component of plasma membrane; potassium channel complex
Biological process	sensory perception of temperature stimulus; regulation of ion transmembrane transport; cellular response to alkaline pH; memory; ion transport; cellular response to temperature stimulus; potassium ion transport; cellular response to mechanical stimulus; cellular response to fatty acid; potassium ion transmembrane transport; sensory perception of pain; detection of mechanical stimulus involved in sensory perception of touch; stabilization of membrane potential
Sources:Amigo / QuickGO
Orthologs
Databases	NCBI: entry; OMA: entry
Species	Human	Mouse
Entrez	50801	16528
Ensembl	ENSG00000182450	ENSMUSG00000024957
UniProt	Q9NYG8	O88454
RefSeq (mRNA)	NM_016611; NM_033310; NM_001317090	NM_008431
RefSeq (protein)	NP_001304019; NP_201567	NP_032457
Location (UCSC)	Chr 11: 64.29 – 64.3 Mb	Chr 19: 6.9 – 6.91 Mb
PubMed search
- Wikidata
View/Edit Human	View/Edit Mouse

Potassium channel subfamily K member 4 is a protein that in humans is encoded by the KCNK4 gene. KCNK4 protein channels are also called TRAAK channels.

== Function ==
KNCK4 is a gene segment that encodes for the TRAAK (TWIK-related Arachidonic Acid-Stimulated K+) subfamily of mechanosensitive potassium channels. Potassium channels play a role in many cellular processes including action potential depolarization, muscle contraction, hormone secretion, osmotic regulation, and ion flow. The K_{2P}4.1 protein is a lipid-gated ion channel that belongs to the superfamily of potassium channel proteins containing two pore-forming P domains (K_{2P}). K_{2P}4.1 homodimerizes and functions as an outwardly rectifying channel. It is expressed primarily in neural tissues and is stimulated by membrane stretch and polyunsaturated fatty acids.

TRAAK channels are found in mammalian neurons and are part of a protein family of weakly inward rectifying potassium channels. This subfamily of potassium channels is mechanically gated. The C-terminal of TRAAK has a charged cluster that is important in maintaining the mechanosensitive properties of the channel.

TRAAK is only expressed in neuronal tissue, and can be found in the brain, spinal cord, and retina, which suggests that it has a function beyond mechanotransduction in terms of neuronal excitability. The highest levels of TRAAK expression are in the olfactory system, cerebral cortex, hippocampal formation, habenula, basal ganglia, and cerebellum. TRAAK channels are mechanically activated when there is a convex curvature in the membrane that alters the channel's activity. TRAAK channels are thought to have a role in axonal pathfinding, growth cone motility, and neurite elongation, as well as possibly having a role in touch or pain detection.

TRAAK channels play a critical role in the maintenance of the resting membrane potential in excitable cell types. More recently, TRAAK channels have been identified as an integral component of the nervous system, contributing to a variety of important biological functions such as: neurite migration, neurotransmission, and signal transduction across several sensory modalities. TRAAK and related mechanosensitive ion channels initiate these and other complex physiological processes by detecting asymmetrical pressure gradients generated across the inner and outer leaflets of the cell membrane, characterizing a rich profile of mechanical bilayer interactions. Furthermore, KCNK4 expression patterns the axonal segments of neurons in both central and peripheral nervous systems by inserting TRAAK membrane protein channels at the Nodes of Ranvier and allowing for saltatory conduction. The pathologies that are associated with improper KCNK4 expression such as Hirchsprung's Disease and FHEIG (facial dysmorphism, hypertrichosis, epilepsy, developmental/ID delay, and gingival overgrowth) syndrome, manifest accordingly as a constellation of neurological symptoms resulting from neuronal dysplasia. Animal models containing known syndromic KCNK4 mutations have recapitulated these phenotypic abnormalities. High TRAAK channel density has also been implicated in the resulting cerebral ischemia following the event of a stroke.

== See also ==
- Tandem pore domain potassium channel
