= KCNK1 =

Protein-coding gene in humans

Identifiers
- Aliases: KCNK1, DPK, HOHO, K2P1, K2p1.1, KCNO1, TWIK-1, TWIK1, potassium two pore domain channel subfamily K member 1
- External IDs: OMIM: 601745; MGI: 109322; GeneCards: KCNK1
Available structures
PDB	Ortholog search: PDBe RCSB
PDB	List of PDB id codes 3UKM

Gene location (Human)
Chr.	Chromosome 1 (human)
Band	1q42.2	Start	233,614,106 bp
Band	1q42.2	End	233,672,514 bp

Gene location (Mouse)
Chr.	Chromosome 8 (mouse)
Band	8|8 E2	Start	126,721,909 bp
Band	8|8 E2	End	126,757,424 bp
RNA expression pattern
Bgee	Human / Mouse (ortholog); Top expressed in: cerebellar vermis; pons; endothelial cell; cerebellar hemisphere; orbitofrontal cortex; right hemisphere of cerebellum; paraflocculus of cerebellum; cartilage tissue; corpus epididymis; cardiac muscle tissue of right atrium / Top expressed in: seminal vesicula; molar; choroid plexus of fourth ventricle; lobe of cerebellum; lobe of prostate; mucosa of urinary bladder; transitional epithelium of urinary bladder; cerebellar vermis; Epithelium of choroid plexus; submandibular gland; More reference expression data
BioGPS	n/a
Gene ontology
Molecular function	sodium channel activity; potassium ion leak channel activity; voltage-gated potassium channel activity; inward rectifier potassium channel activity; potassium channel activity; protein binding; identical protein binding
Cellular component	cytoplasm; integral component of membrane; recycling endosome; perikaryon; endosome; cell projection; membrane; voltage-gated potassium channel complex; plasma membrane; integral component of plasma membrane; synapse; inward rectifier potassium channel complex; brush border membrane; cell junction; dendrite; potassium channel complex; apical plasma membrane; cytoplasmic vesicle; intracellular membrane-bounded organelle
Biological process	sodium ion transmembrane transport; response to nicotine; ion transport; potassium ion transport; cardiac conduction; potassium ion transmembrane transport; regulation of resting membrane potential; stabilization of membrane potential
Sources:Amigo / QuickGO
Orthologs
Databases	NCBI: entry; OMA: entry
Species	Human	Mouse
Entrez	3775	16525
Ensembl	ENSG00000135750	ENSMUSG00000033998
UniProt	O00180	O08581
RefSeq (mRNA)	NM_002245	NM_008430
RefSeq (protein)	NP_002236	NP_032456
Location (UCSC)	Chr 1: 233.61 – 233.67 Mb	Chr 8: 126.72 – 126.76 Mb
PubMed search
- Wikidata
View/Edit Human	View/Edit Mouse

Potassium channel subfamily K member 1 is a protein that in humans is encoded by the KCNK1 gene.

This gene encodes K_{2P}1.1, a member of the superfamily of potassium channel proteins containing two pore-forming P domains. The product of this gene has not been shown to be a functional channel, however, and it may require other non-pore-forming proteins for activity.

== See also ==
- Tandem pore domain potassium channel
