= Cromakalim =

Chemical compound

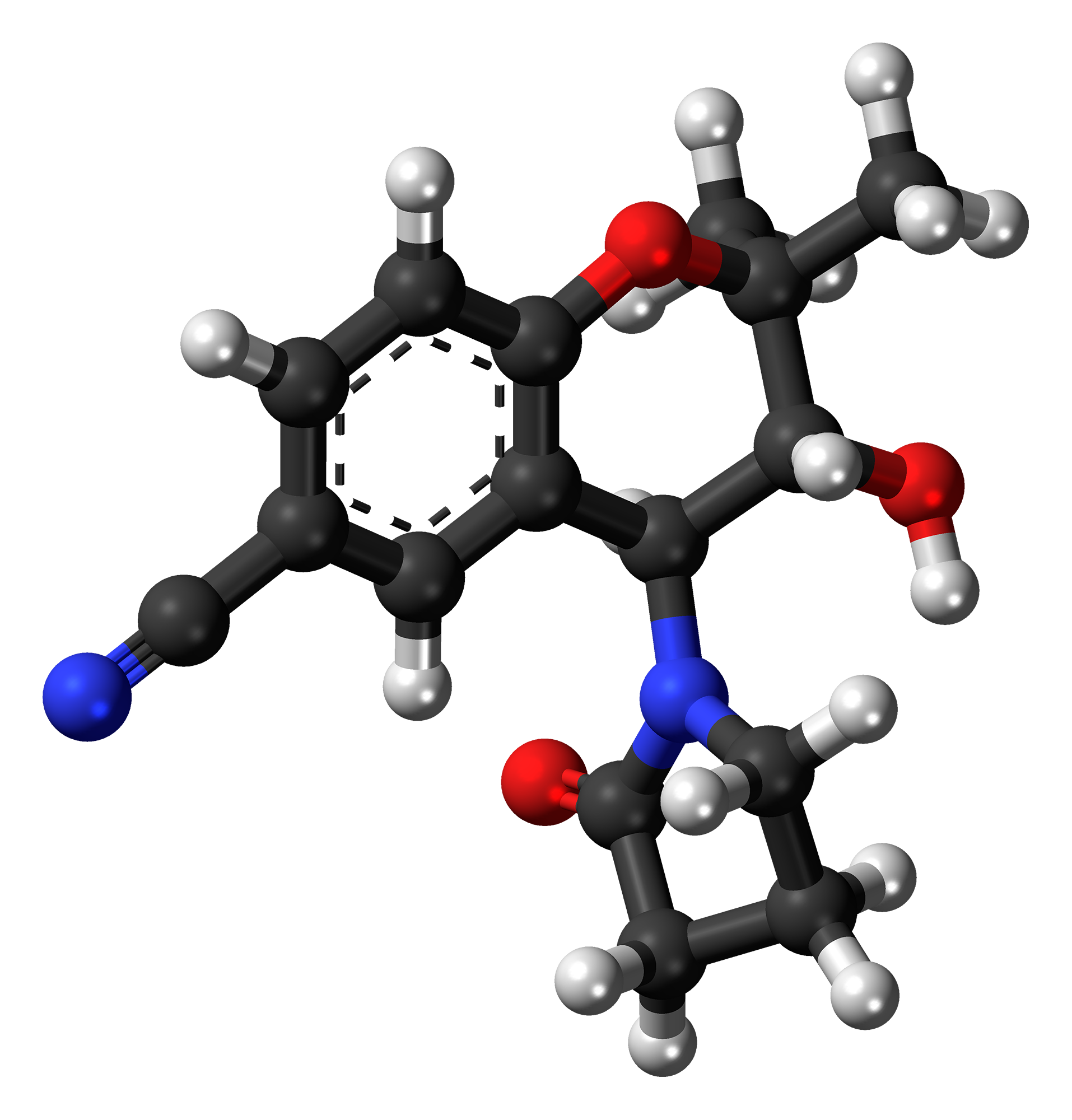

Clinical data
- ATC code: none

Identifiers
- IUPAC name: (3R,4S)-3-hydroxy-2,2-dimethyl-4-(2-oxopyrrolidin-1-yl)chroman-6-carbonitrile
- CAS Number: 94470-67-4
- PubChem CID: 71191
- ChemSpider: 64327
- UNII: 0G4X367WA3
- ChEMBL: ChEMBL11684
- CompTox Dashboard (EPA): DTXSID301317350

Chemical and physical data
- Formula: C_{16}H_{18}N_{2}O_{3}
- Molar mass: 286.331 g·mol^{−1}
- 3D model (JSmol): Interactive image
- SMILES: O=C3N([C@H]1c2c(OC([C@@H]1O)(C)C)ccc(C#N)c2)CCC3

Cromakalim (INN) is a potassium channel-opening vasodilator. The active isomer is levcromakalim. It acts on ATP-sensitive potassium channels and so causes membrane hyperpolarization. It can be used to treat hypertension as it will relax vascular smooth muscle to lower blood pressure. Hyperpolarisation of smooth muscle cell membranes pulls their membrane potential away from the threshold, so making it more difficult to excite them and thereby cause relaxation.

== Synthesis ==
Levcromakalim synthesis: racemate: of isomers:

Reaction of 4-cyanophenol (4-Hydroxybenzonitrile) with 2-hydroxy-2-methyl-3-butyne under PTC probably proceeds to initial formation of a propargyl carbocation. The course of the reaction can be envisaged by assuming that this then attacks the aromatic ring; the resulting allylic cation can then capture the adjacent phenol oxygen and thus form the observed product (3). Treatment of that product with aqueous NBS leads to the addition of the elements of hypobromous acid and formation of the bromohydrin (4) as a mixture of the trans enantiomers. This cyclizes to the epoxide 5 in the presence of sodium hydroxide (5). Ring opening of the oxirane with ammonia gives a mixture of the trans amino alcohols (6). These are probably resolved at this stage and the 3S,4R-enantiomer used in the next stage. That isomer is next acylated with 4-Chlorobutyryl chloride to give the chloroamide (7). The anion from reaction of the amide with sodium hydride then displaces the chlorine on the end of the chain to form the pyrrolidine ring. There is thus obtained levcromakalim (8).
