= KCNK16 =

Protein-coding gene in the species Homo sapiens

Identifiers
- Aliases: KCNK16, K2p16.1, TALK-1, TALK1, potassium two pore domain channel subfamily K member 16
- External IDs: OMIM: 607369; MGI: 1921821; GeneCards: KCNK16

Gene location (Human)
Chr.	Chromosome 6 (human)
Band	6p21.2	Start	39,314,698 bp
Band	6p21.2	End	39,322,968 bp

Gene location (Mouse)
Chr.	Chromosome 14 (mouse)
Band	14 A3|14	Start	20,311,444 bp
Band	14 A3|14	End	20,319,267 bp
RNA expression pattern
Bgee	Human / Mouse (ortholog); Top expressed in: islet of Langerhans; body of pancreas; duodenum; body of stomach; fundus; left lobe of thyroid gland; ascending aorta; right lung; right lobe of thyroid gland; olfactory zone of nasal mucosa / Top expressed in: islet of Langerhans; embryo; yolk sac; stomach; lip; hair follicle; skin of abdomen; lumbar spinal ganglion; skin of back; genital tubercle; More reference expression data
BioGPS	n/a
Gene ontology
Molecular function	protein binding; voltage-gated ion channel activity; potassium channel activity; potassium ion leak channel activity
Cellular component	integral component of membrane; plasma membrane; membrane; integral component of plasma membrane
Biological process	potassium ion transport; regulation of ion transmembrane transport; ion transport; potassium ion transmembrane transport; stabilization of membrane potential
Sources:Amigo / QuickGO
Orthologs
Databases	NCBI: entry; OMA: entry
Species	Human	Mouse
Entrez	83795	74571
Ensembl	ENSG00000095981	ENSMUSG00000023387
UniProt	Q96T55	G5E845
RefSeq (mRNA)	NM_001135105; NM_001135106; NM_001135107; NM_032115; NM_001363784	NM_029006
RefSeq (protein)	NP_001128577; NP_001128578; NP_001128579; NP_115491; NP_001350713	NP_083282
Location (UCSC)	Chr 6: 39.31 – 39.32 Mb	Chr 14: 20.31 – 20.32 Mb
PubMed search
- Wikidata
View/Edit Human	View/Edit Mouse

Potassium channel subfamily K member 16 is a protein that in humans is encoded by the KCNK16 gene. The protein encoded by this gene, K_{2P}16.1, is a potassium channel containing two pore-forming P domains.

== See also ==
- Tandem pore domain potassium channel
