= KCNK18 =

Protein-coding gene in the species Homo sapiens

Identifiers
- Aliases: KCNK18, K2p18.1, MGR13, TRESK, TRESK-2, TRESK2, TRIK, potassium two pore domain channel subfamily K member 18
- External IDs: OMIM: 613655; MGI: 2685627; GeneCards: KCNK18

Gene location (Human)
Chr.	Chromosome 10 (human)
Band	10q25.3	Start	117,197,489 bp
Band	10q25.3	End	117,210,299 bp

Gene location (Mouse)
Chr.	Chromosome 19 (mouse)
Band	19|19 D3	Start	59,207,646 bp
Band	19|19 D3	End	59,225,806 bp
RNA expression pattern
Bgee	Human / Mouse (ortholog); Top expressed in: nucleus accumbens; caudate nucleus; prefrontal cortex; hypothalamus; renal cortex; anterior cingulate cortex / Top expressed in: zygote; secondary oocyte; primary oocyte; embryo; placenta; More reference expression data
BioGPS	n/a
Gene ontology
Molecular function	calcium-activated potassium channel activity; outward rectifier potassium channel activity; potassium channel activity; potassium ion leak channel activity
Cellular component	integral component of membrane; plasma membrane; membrane; integral component of plasma membrane
Biological process	potassium ion transport; cellular response to pH; ion transport; potassium ion transmembrane transport; stabilization of membrane potential; potassium ion export across plasma membrane
Sources:Amigo / QuickGO
Orthologs
Databases	NCBI: entry; OMA: entry
Species	Human	Mouse
Entrez	338567	332396
Ensembl	ENSG00000186795	ENSMUSG00000040901
UniProt	Q7Z418	Q6VV64
RefSeq (mRNA)	NM_181840	NM_207261
RefSeq (protein)	NP_862823	NP_997144
Location (UCSC)	Chr 10: 117.2 – 117.21 Mb	Chr 19: 59.21 – 59.23 Mb
PubMed search
- Wikidata
View/Edit Human	View/Edit Mouse

Potassium channel subfamily K member 18 (KCNK18), also known as TWIK-related spinal cord potassium channel (TRESK) or K_{2P}18.1 is a protein that in humans is encoded by the KCNK18 gene. K_{2P}18.1 is a potassium channel containing two pore-forming P domains.

A flaw in this gene could help trigger migraine headaches. If the gene does not work properly, environmental factors can more easily trigger pain centres in the brain and cause a severe headache.

== See also ==
- Tandem pore domain potassium channel
