= KCNK12 =

Protein-coding gene in the species Homo sapiens

Identifiers
- Aliases: KCNK12, K2p12.1, THIK-2, THIK2, potassium two pore domain channel subfamily K member 12
- External IDs: OMIM: 607366; MGI: 2684043; GeneCards: KCNK12

Gene location (Human)
Chr.	Chromosome 2 (human)
Band	2p16.3	Start	47,509,290 bp
Band	2p16.3	End	47,570,985 bp

Gene location (Mouse)
Chr.	Chromosome 17 (mouse)
Band	17|17 E4	Start	88,053,229 bp
Band	17|17 E4	End	88,105,422 bp
RNA expression pattern
Bgee	Human / Mouse (ortholog); Top expressed in: olfactory bulb; trigeminal ganglion; spinal ganglia; inferior olivary nucleus; cerebellum; cerebellar cortex; cerebellar hemisphere; right hemisphere of cerebellum; sural nerve; primary visual cortex / Top expressed in: primary visual cortex; cerebellar cortex; superior frontal gyrus; embryo; granulocyte; dentate gyrus of hippocampal formation granule cell; neural layer of retina; anterior horn of spinal cord; olfactory bulb; hippocampus proper; More reference expression data
BioGPS	n/a
Gene ontology
Molecular function	potassium channel activity; voltage-gated ion channel activity; potassium ion leak channel activity
Cellular component	integral component of membrane; membrane; integral component of plasma membrane
Biological process	potassium ion transport; regulation of ion transmembrane transport; ion transport; stabilization of membrane potential; potassium ion transmembrane transport
Sources:Amigo / QuickGO
Orthologs
Databases	NCBI: entry; OMA: entry
Species	Human	Mouse
Entrez	56660	210741
Ensembl	ENSG00000184261	ENSMUSG00000050138
UniProt	Q9HB15	Q76M80
RefSeq (mRNA)	NM_022055	NM_199251
RefSeq (protein)	NP_071338	NP_954859
Location (UCSC)	Chr 2: 47.51 – 47.57 Mb	Chr 17: 88.05 – 88.11 Mb
PubMed search
- Wikidata
View/Edit Human	View/Edit Mouse

Potassium channel, subfamily K, member 12, also known as KCNK12, is a human gene. The protein encoded by this gene, K_{2P}12.1, is a potassium channel containing two pore-forming P domains.

== See also ==
- Tandem pore domain potassium channel
