= Niflumic acid =

Drug used in treatment of joint and muscular pain

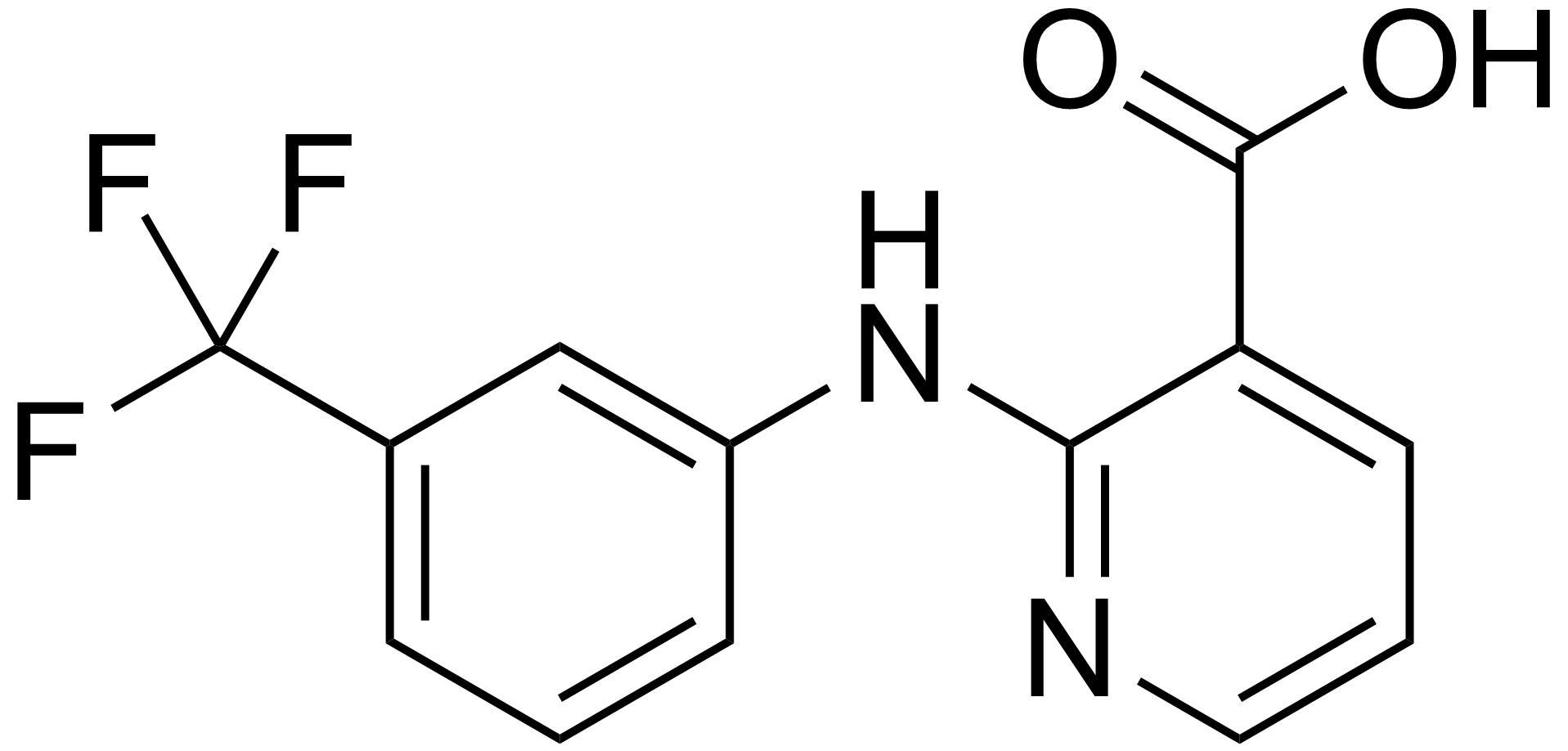

Clinical data
- AHFS/Drugs.com: International Drug Names
- ATC code: M01AX02 (WHO) M02AA17 (WHO)

Pharmacokinetic data
- Elimination half-life: 2.5 hr

Identifiers
- IUPAC name: 2-{[3-(trifluoromethyl)phenyl]amino}nicotinic acid
- CAS Number: 4394-00-7
- PubChem CID: 4488
- IUPHAR/BPS: 2439
- ChemSpider: 4333
- UNII: 4U5MP5IUD8
- KEGG: D08275
- ChEMBL: ChEMBL63323
- CompTox Dashboard (EPA): DTXSID1023368
- ECHA InfoCard: 100.022.289

Chemical and physical data
- Formula: C_{13}H_{9}F_{3}N_{2}O_{2}
- Molar mass: 282.222 g·mol^{−1}
- 3D model (JSmol): Interactive image
- Melting point: 204 °C (399 °F)
- SMILES: C1=CC(=CC(=C1)NC2=C(C=CC=N2)C(=O)O)C(F)(F)F
- InChI: InChI=1S/C13H9F3N2O2/c14-13(15,16)8-3-1-4-9(7-8)18-11-10(12(19)20)5-2-6-17-11/h1-7H,(H,17,18)(H,19,20); Key:JZFPYUNJRRFVQU-UHFFFAOYSA-N

Niflumic acid is a drug used for joint and muscular pain. It is categorized as an inhibitor of cyclooxygenase-2. In experimental biology, it has been employed to inhibit chloride channels. It has also been reported to act on GABA-A and NMDA channels and to block T-type calcium channels.
