= KCNK6 =

Protein-coding gene in humans

Identifiers
- Aliases: KCNK6, K2p6.1, KCNK8, TOSS, TWIK-2, TWIK2, potassium two pore domain channel subfamily K member 6
- External IDs: OMIM: 603939; MGI: 1891291; GeneCards: KCNK6

Gene location (Human)
Chr.	Chromosome 19 (human)
Band	19q13.2	Start	38,319,845 bp
Band	19q13.2	End	38,332,076 bp

Gene location (Mouse)
Chr.	Chromosome 7 (mouse)
Band	7 B1|7 16.94 cM	Start	28,921,351 bp
Band	7 B1|7 16.94 cM	End	28,931,940 bp
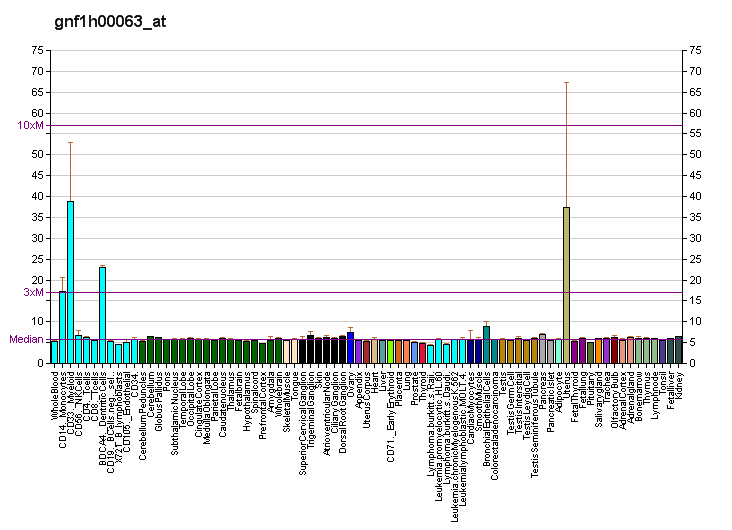
RNA expression pattern
Bgee	Human / Mouse (ortholog); Top expressed in: decidua; ectocervix; monocyte; right coronary artery; ascending aorta; myometrium; mucosa of transverse colon; vagina; smooth muscle tissue; parotid gland / Top expressed in: fossa; skin of abdomen; right lobe of liver; epithelium of stomach; Paneth cell; parotid gland; condyle; stroma of bone marrow; mesenteric lymph nodes; umbilical cord; More reference expression data
BioGPS	More reference expression data
Gene ontology
Molecular function	inward rectifier potassium channel activity; voltage-gated ion channel activity; potassium channel activity; potassium ion leak channel activity
Cellular component	integral component of membrane; voltage-gated potassium channel complex; plasma membrane; membrane; integral component of plasma membrane
Biological process	regulation of resting membrane potential; potassium ion transport; regulation of ion transmembrane transport; cardiac conduction; ion transport; negative regulation of systemic arterial blood pressure; potassium ion transmembrane transport; regulation of systemic arterial blood pressure; stabilization of membrane potential
Sources:Amigo / QuickGO
Orthologs
Databases	NCBI: entry; OMA: entry
Species	Human	Mouse
Entrez	9424	52150
Ensembl	ENSG00000099337	ENSMUSG00000046410
UniProt	Q9Y257	n/a
RefSeq (mRNA)	NM_004823	NM_001033525
RefSeq (protein)	NP_004814; NP_004814.1	n/a
Location (UCSC)	Chr 19: 38.32 – 38.33 Mb	Chr 7: 28.92 – 28.93 Mb
PubMed search
- Wikidata
View/Edit Human	View/Edit Mouse

Potassium channel subfamily K member 6 is a protein encoded by the KCNK6 gene in humans.

This gene encodes K_{2P}6.1, a member of the superfamily of potassium channel proteins containing two pore-forming P domains. K_{2P}6.1, considered an open rectifier, is widely expressed. It is stimulated by arachidonic acid and inhibited by internal acidification and volatile anaesthetics.

== See also ==
- Tandem pore domain potassium channel
