= KCNK5 =

Protein-coding gene in the species Homo sapiens

Identifiers
- Aliases: KCNK5, K2p5.1, TASK-2, TASK2, KCNK5b, potassium two pore domain channel subfamily K member 5
- External IDs: OMIM: 603493; MGI: 1336175; GeneCards: KCNK5

Gene location (Human)
Chr.	Chromosome 6 (human)
Band	6p21.2	Start	39,188,971 bp
Band	6p21.2	End	39,229,475 bp

Gene location (Mouse)
Chr.	Chromosome 14 (mouse)
Band	14|14 A3	Start	20,190,125 bp
Band	14|14 A3	End	20,231,877 bp
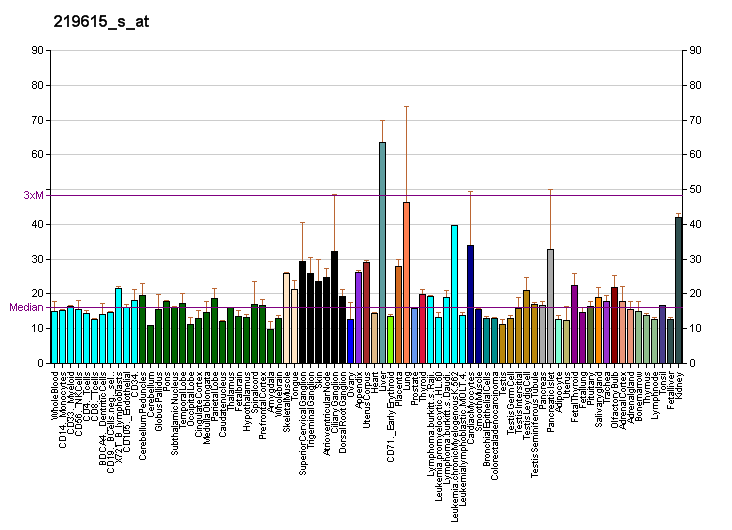
RNA expression pattern
Bgee	Human / Mouse (ortholog); Top expressed in: pancreatic ductal cell; mucosa of transverse colon; mucosa of ileum; oocyte; duodenum; human kidney; kidney tubule; secondary oocyte; jejunal mucosa; skin of leg / Top expressed in: right kidney; proximal tubule; intestinal villus; human kidney; left colon; jejunum; lumbar spinal ganglion; pyloric antrum; morula; duodenum; More reference expression data
BioGPS	More reference expression data
Gene ontology
Molecular function	voltage-gated potassium channel activity; potassium channel activity; voltage-gated ion channel activity; potassium ion leak channel activity
Cellular component	integral component of membrane; integral component of plasma membrane; membrane
Biological process	potassium ion transport; regulation of ion transmembrane transport; excretion; ion transport; potassium ion transmembrane transport; stabilization of membrane potential
Sources:Amigo / QuickGO
Orthologs
Databases	NCBI: entry; OMA: entry
Species	Human	Mouse
Entrez	8645	16529
Ensembl	ENSG00000164626	ENSMUSG00000023243
UniProt	O95279	Q9JK62
RefSeq (mRNA)	NM_003740	NM_021542
RefSeq (protein)	NP_003731	NP_067517
Location (UCSC)	Chr 6: 39.19 – 39.23 Mb	Chr 14: 20.19 – 20.23 Mb
PubMed search
- Wikidata
View/Edit Human	View/Edit Mouse

Potassium channel subfamily K member 5 is a protein that in humans is encoded by the KCNK5 gene.

This gene encodes K_{2P}5.1, one of the members of the superfamily of potassium channel proteins containing two pore-forming P domains. The message for this gene is mainly expressed in the cortical distal tubules and collecting ducts of the kidney. The protein is highly sensitive to external pH and this, in combination with its expression pattern, suggests it may play an important role in renal potassium transport.

== See also ==
- Tandem pore domain potassium channel
