= KCNK9 =

Protein-coding gene in the species Homo sapiens

Identifiers
- Aliases: KCNK9, K2p9.1, KT3.2, TASK-3, TASK3, potassium two pore domain channel subfamily K member 9, BIBARS, TASK32
- External IDs: OMIM: 605874; MGI: 3521816; GeneCards: KCNK9
Available structures
PDB	Ortholog search: PDBe RCSB
PDB	List of PDB id codes 3P1N, 3P1O, 3P1P, 3P1Q, 3P1R, 3P1S, 3SMK, 3SML, 3SMM, 3SMN, 3SMO, 3SPR, 3UX0, 4FR3, 3SP5

Gene location (Human)
Chr.	Chromosome 8 (human)
Band	8q24.3	Start	139,600,838 bp
Band	8q24.3	End	139,704,109 bp
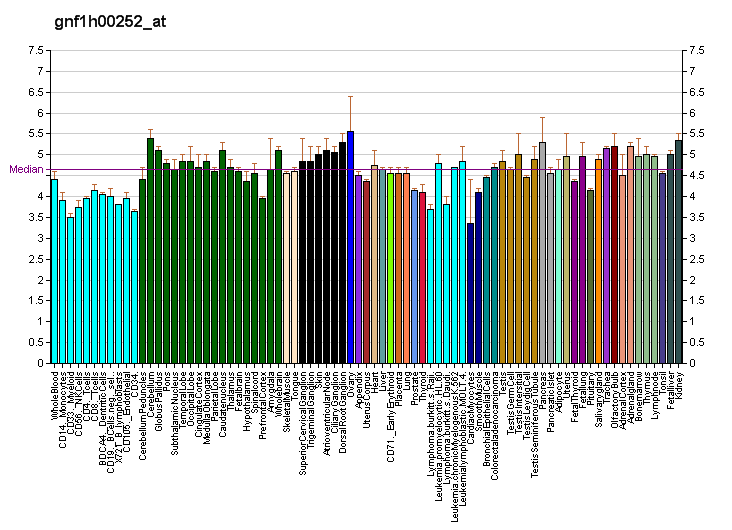
RNA expression pattern
Bgee	Human / Mouse (ortholog); Top expressed in: cerebellar hemisphere; right hemisphere of cerebellum; cerebellar vermis; right frontal lobe; secondary oocyte; Brodmann area 9; prefrontal cortex; primary visual cortex; Brodmann area 23; hypothalamus / n/a; More reference expression data
BioGPS	More reference expression data
Gene ontology
Molecular function	voltage-gated potassium channel activity; protein homodimerization activity; protein heterodimerization activity; potassium channel activity; potassium ion leak channel activity
Cellular component	integral component of membrane; plasma membrane; membrane; synaptic vesicle; integral component of plasma membrane
Biological process	potassium ion transport; ion transport; stabilization of membrane potential; potassium ion transmembrane transport
Sources:Amigo / QuickGO
Orthologs
Databases	NCBI: entry; OMA: entry
Species	Human	Mouse
Entrez	51305	223604
Ensembl	ENSG00000169427	n/a
UniProt	Q9NPC2	Q3LS21
RefSeq (mRNA)	NM_001282534	NM_001033876
RefSeq (protein)	NP_001269463	NP_001029048
Location (UCSC)	Chr 8: 139.6 – 139.7 Mb	n/a
PubMed search
- Wikidata
View/Edit Human	View/Edit Mouse

Potassium channel subfamily K member 9 is a protein that in humans is encoded by the KCNK9 gene.

This gene encodes K_{2P}9.1, one of the members of the superfamily of potassium channel proteins containing two pore-forming P domains. This open channel is highly expressed in the cerebellum. It is inhibited by extracellular acidification and arachidonic acid, and strongly inhibited by phorbol 12-myristate 13-acetate. Phorbol 12-myristate 13-acetate is also known as 12-O-tetradecanoylphorbol-13-acetate (TPA). TASK channels are additionally inhibited by hormones and transmitters that signal through GqPCRs. The resulting cellular depolarization is thought to regulate processes such as motor control and aldosterone secretion. Despite early controversy about the exact mechanism underlying this inhibition, the current view is that diacyl-glycerol, produced by the breakdown of phosphatidylinositol-4,5-bis-phosphate by phospholipase Cβ causes channel closure.

== Expression ==
The KCNK9 gene is expressed as an ion channel more commonly known as TASK 3. This channel has a varied pattern of expression. TASK 3 is coexpressed with TASK 1 (KCNK3) in the cerebellar granule cells, locus coeruleus, motor neurons, pontine nuclei, some cells in the neocortex, habenula, olfactory bulb granule cells, and cells in the external plexiform layer of the olfactory bulb. TASK-3 channels are also expressed in the hippocampus; both on pyramidal cells and interneurons. It is thought that these channels may form heterodimers where their expressions co-localise.

== Function ==
Mice in which the TASK-3 gene has been deleted have reduced sensitivity to inhalation anaesthetics, exaggerated nocturnal activity and cognitive deficits as well as significantly increased appetite and weight gain. A role for TASK-3 channels in neuronal network oscillations has also been described: TASK-3 knockout mice lack the atropine-sensitive halothane-induced theta oscillation (4–7 Hz) from the hippocampus and are unable to maintain theta oscillations during rapid eye movement (REM) sleep.

== Interactive pathway map ==
Click on genes, proteins and metabolites below to link to respective articles. (Note: The interactive pathway map can be edited at WikiPathways: "NicotineDopaminergic_WP1602".)

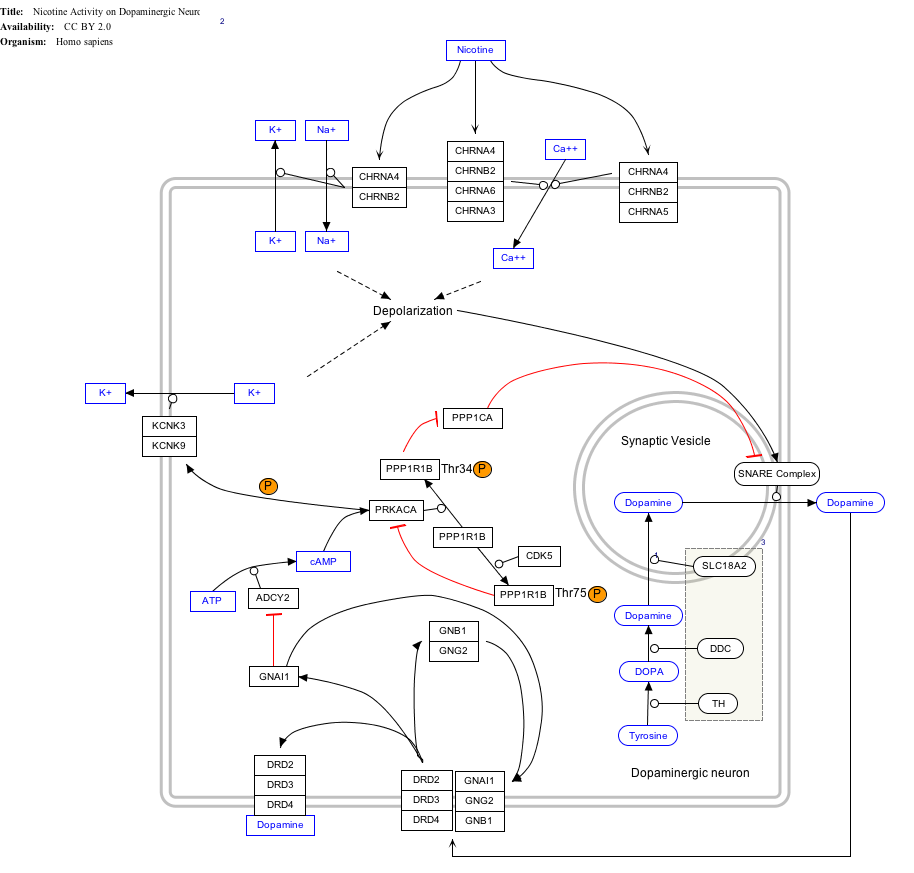

Nicotine Activity on Dopaminergic Neurons edit

== See also ==
- Tandem pore domain potassium channel
