= Bimakalim =

Names
- Preferred IUPAC name 2,2-Dimethyl-4-(2-oxopyridin-1(2H)-yl)-2H-1-benzopyran-6-carbonitrile

Identifiers
CAS Number	117545-11-6
3D model (JSmol)	Interactive image
ChEMBL	ChEMBL12552
ChemSpider	54683
PubChem CID	60674
UNII	4MP5GR4H9L
CompTox Dashboard (EPA)	DTXSID40151803
- InChI: InChI=1S/C17H14N2O2/c1-17(2)10-14(19-8-4-3-5-16(19)20)13-9-12(11-18)6-7-15(13)21-17/h3-10H,1-2H3 Key: JTVSKASWNROQQF-UHFFFAOYSA-N
- SMILES: CC1(C=C(c2cc(ccc2O1)C#N)n3ccccc3=O)C

Properties
Chemical formula	C_{17}H_{14}N_{2}O_{2}
Molar mass	278.311 g·mol^{−1}
- Except where otherwise noted, data are given for materials in their standard state (at 25 °C [77 °F], 100 kPa). Infobox references

Bimakalim is a potassium channel opener. It can be prepared from 2-acetyl-4-cyanophenol .
