= KCNK17 =

Protein-coding gene in the species Homo sapiens

Identifiers
- Aliases: KCNK17, K2p17.1, TALK-2, TALK2, TASK-4, TASK4, potassium two pore domain channel subfamily K member 17
- External IDs: OMIM: 607370; GeneCards: KCNK17

Gene location (Human)
Chr.	Chromosome 6 (human)
Band	6p21.2	Start	39,299,001 bp
Band	6p21.2	End	39,314,461 bp
RNA expression pattern
Bgee	Human / Mouse (ortholog); Top expressed in: ascending aorta; Descending thoracic aorta; right coronary artery; islet of Langerhans; left coronary artery; right lung; upper lobe of lung; upper lobe of left lung; lower lobe of lung; tibia / n/a; More reference expression data
BioGPS	n/a
Gene ontology
Molecular function	voltage-gated ion channel activity; potassium channel activity; potassium ion leak channel activity
Cellular component	integral component of membrane; plasma membrane; membrane; integral component of plasma membrane
Biological process	potassium ion transport; regulation of ion transmembrane transport; ion transport; potassium ion transmembrane transport; stabilization of membrane potential
Sources:Amigo / QuickGO
Orthologs
Databases	NCBI: entry; OMA: entry
Species	Human	Mouse
Entrez	89822	n/a
Ensembl	ENSG00000124780	n/a
UniProt	Q96T54	n/a
RefSeq (mRNA)	NM_001135111; NM_031460	n/a
RefSeq (protein)	NP_001128583; NP_113648	n/a
Location (UCSC)	Chr 6: 39.3 – 39.31 Mb	n/a
PubMed search		n/a
- Wikidata
View/Edit Human

Potassium channel subfamily K member 17 is a protein that in humans is encoded by the KCNK17 gene.

This gene encodes K_{2P}17.1, one of the members of the superfamily of potassium channel proteins containing two pore-forming P domains. This open channel, primarily expressed in the pancreas, is activated at alkaline pH.

== See also ==
- Tandem pore domain potassium channel
