= KCNK15 =

Protein-coding gene in the species Homo sapiens

Identifiers
- Aliases: KCNK15, K2p15.1, KCNK11, KCNK14, KT3.3, TASK-5, TASK5, dJ781B1.1, potassium two pore domain channel subfamily K member 15
- External IDs: OMIM: 607368; MGI: 2675209; GeneCards: KCNK15

Gene location (Human)
Chr.	Chromosome 20 (human)
Band	20q13.12	Start	44,745,865 bp
Band	20q13.12	End	44,752,313 bp

Gene location (Mouse)
Chr.	Chromosome 2 (mouse)
Band	2|2 H3	Start	163,695,571 bp
Band	2|2 H3	End	163,701,666 bp
RNA expression pattern
Bgee	Human / Mouse (ortholog); Top expressed in: thoracic aorta; ascending aorta; Descending thoracic aorta; left coronary artery; gonad; right coronary artery; popliteal artery; tibial arteries; right uterine tube; testicle / Top expressed in: cumulus cell; olfactory bulb; sternocleidomastoid muscle; cerebellar cortex; superior frontal gyrus; submandibular gland; placenta; More reference expression data
BioGPS	n/a
Gene ontology
Molecular function	voltage-gated ion channel activity; potassium channel activity; potassium ion leak channel activity
Cellular component	integral component of membrane; plasma membrane; membrane; integral component of plasma membrane
Biological process	potassium ion transport; regulation of ion transmembrane transport; cardiac conduction; ion transport; stabilization of membrane potential; potassium ion transmembrane transport
Sources:Amigo / QuickGO
Orthologs
Databases	NCBI: entry; OMA: entry
Species	Human	Mouse
Entrez	60598	241769
Ensembl	ENSG00000124249	ENSMUSG00000035238
UniProt	Q9H427	n/a
RefSeq (mRNA)	NM_022358	NM_001030292
RefSeq (protein)	NP_071753	n/a
Location (UCSC)	Chr 20: 44.75 – 44.75 Mb	Chr 2: 163.7 – 163.7 Mb
PubMed search
- Wikidata
View/Edit Human	View/Edit Mouse

Potassium channel subfamily K member 15 is a protein that in humans is encoded by the KCNK15 gene.

This gene encodes K_{2P}15.1, one of the members of the superfamily of potassium channel proteins containing two pore-forming P domains. K_{2P}15.1 has not been shown to be a functional channel; however, it may require other non-pore-forming proteins for activity.

== See also ==
- Tandem pore domain potassium channel
