= Two-pore-domain potassium channel =

Class of transport proteins

K2P1
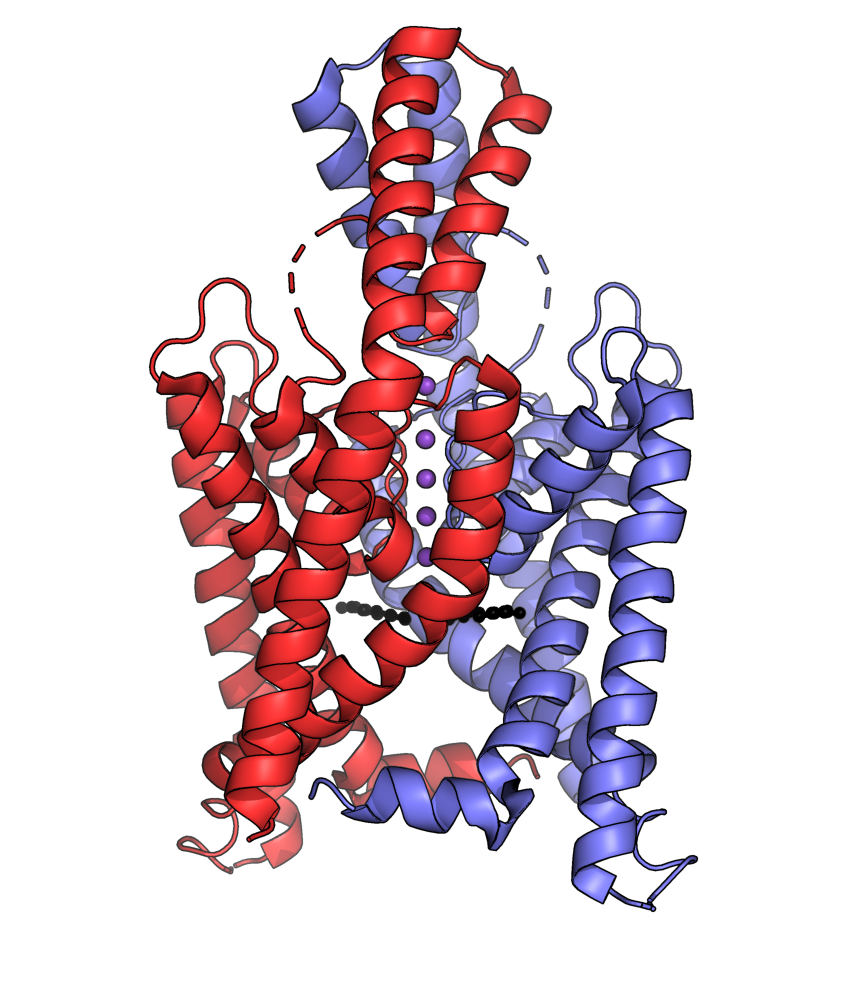
- Human K2P1 PDB: 3UKM

Identifiers
- Symbol: K2P1
- HGNC: 6272
- RefSeq: NP_002236.1
- UniProt: O00180
Search for
- Structures: Swiss-model
- Domains: InterPro

The two-pore-domain or tandem pore domain potassium channels are a family of 15 members that form what is known as leak channels which possess Goldman-Hodgkin-Katz (open) rectification. These channels are regulated by several mechanisms including signaling lipids, oxygen tension, pH, mechanical stretch, and G-proteins. Two-pore-domain potassium channels correspond structurally to a inward-rectifier potassium channel α-subunits. Each inward-rectifier potassium channel α-subunit is composed of two transmembrane α-helices, a pore helix and a potassium ion selectivity filter sequence and assembles into a tetramer forming the complete channel. The two-pore domain potassium channels instead are dimers where each subunit is essentially two α-subunits joined together.

Each single channel does not have two pores; the name of the channel comes from the fact that each subunit has two P (pore) domains in its primary sequence. To quote Rang and Dale (2015), "The nomenclature is misleading, especially when they are incorrectly referred to as two-pore channels".

A decrease in these leak channels activity is known as 'channel arrest', which reduces oxygen consumption and allows animals to survive anoxia.

Below is a list of the 15 known two-pore-domain human potassium channels:

Gene	Channel	Family	Aliases
KCNK1	K_{2p}1.1	TWIK	TWIK-1
KCNK2	K_{2p}2.1	TREK	TREK-1
KCNK3	K_{2p}3.1	TASK	TASK-1
KCNK4	K_{2p}4.1	TREK	TRAAK
KCNK5	K_{2p}5.1	TASK	TASK-2
KCNK6	K_{2p}6.1	TWIK	TWIK-2
KCNK7	K_{2p}7.1	TWIK	
KCNK9	K_{2p}9.1	TASK	TASK-3
KCNK10	K_{2p}10.1	TREK	TREK-2
KCNK12	K_{2p}12.1	THIK	THIK-2
KCNK13	K_{2p}13.1	THIK	THIK-1
KCNK15	K_{2p}15.1	TASK	TASK-5
KCNK16	K_{2p}16.1	TALK	TALK-1
KCNK17	K_{2p}17.1	TALK	TALK-2, TASK-4
KCNK18	K_{2p}18.1		TRIK, TRESK

K2P2
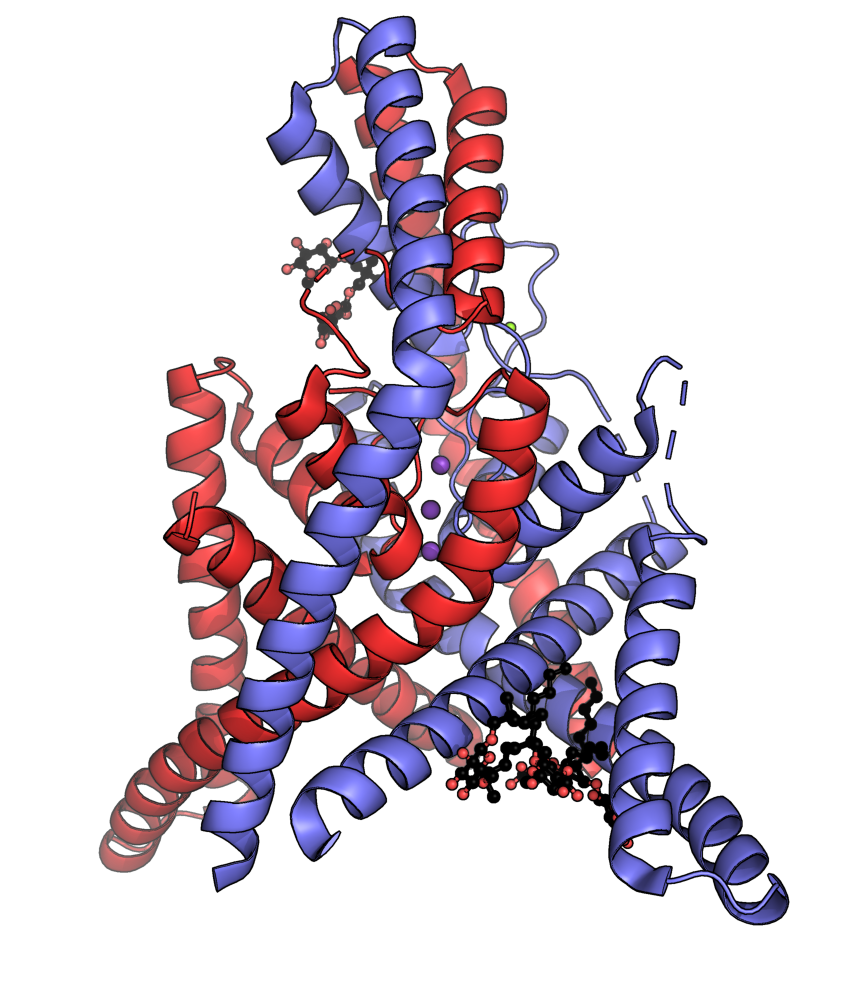
- Human K2P2 PDB: 4TWK

Identifiers
- Symbol: K2P2
- HGNC: 6277
- RefSeq: NP_055032.1
- UniProt: O95069
Search for
- Structures: Swiss-model
- Domains: InterPro

K2P3
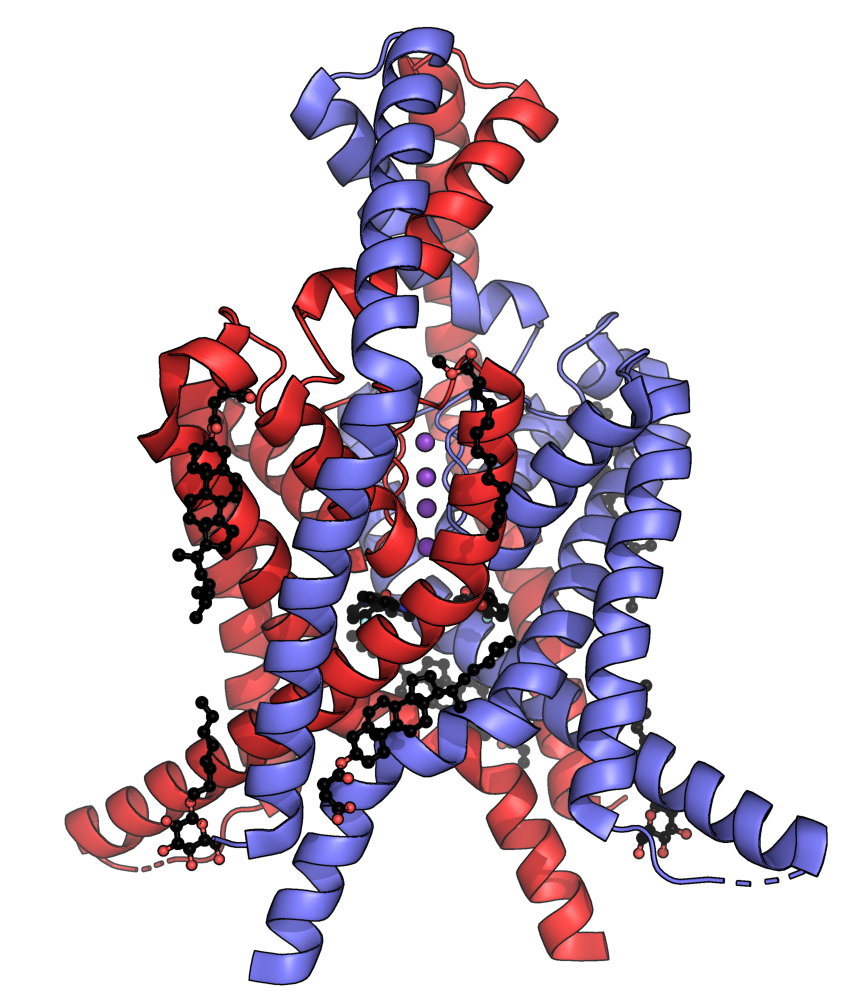
- Human K2P3 PDB: 6RV3

Identifiers
- Symbol: K2P3
- HGNC: 6278
- RefSeq: NP_002237.1
- UniProt: O14649
Search for
- Structures: Swiss-model
- Domains: InterPro

== See also ==
- Ion channel
- Potassium channel
