= KCNK3 =

Protein-coding gene in humans

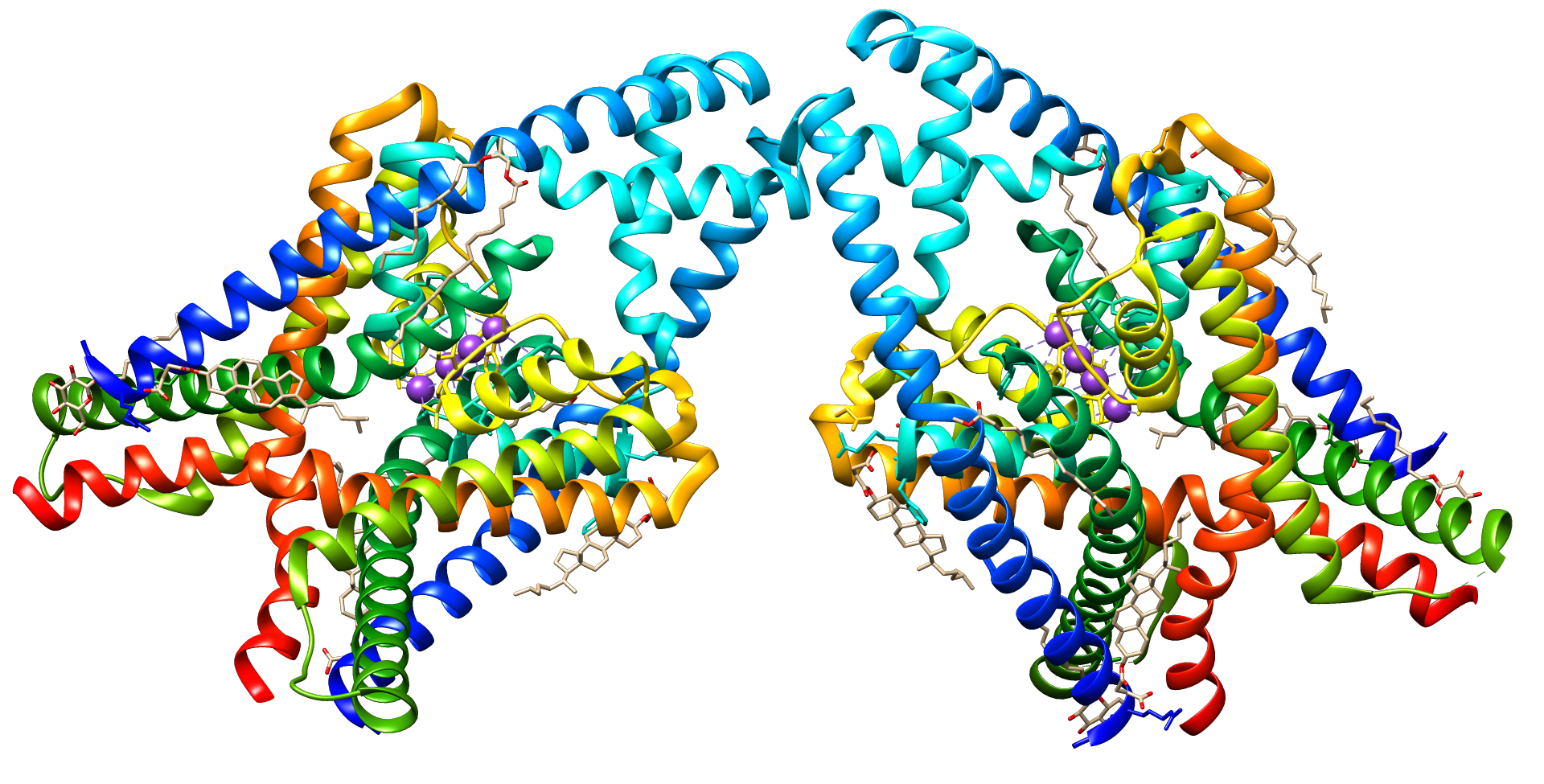

Identifiers
- Aliases: KCNK3, K2p3.1, OAT1, PPH4, TASK, TASK-1, TBAK1, potassium two pore domain channel subfamily K member 3, TASK1
- External IDs: OMIM: 603220; MGI: 1100509; GeneCards: KCNK3
Available structures
PDB	Ortholog search: PDBe RCSB
PDB	List of PDB id codes 6RV2, 6RV3, 6RV4

Gene location (Human)
Chr.	Chromosome 2 (human)
Band	2p23.3	Start	26,692,722 bp
Band	2p23.3	End	26,733,420 bp

Gene location (Mouse)
Chr.	Chromosome 5 (mouse)
Band	5 B1|5 16.68 cM	Start	30,745,514 bp
Band	5 B1|5 16.68 cM	End	30,782,615 bp
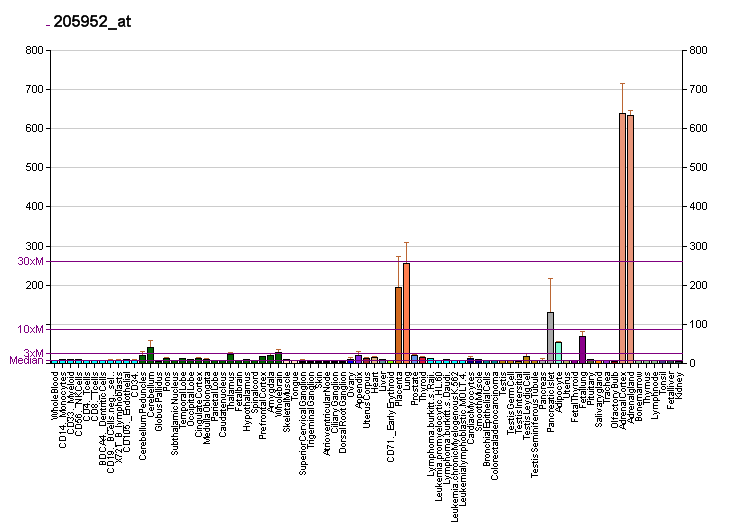
RNA expression pattern
Bgee	Human / Mouse (ortholog); Top expressed in: left adrenal gland; adrenal cortex; left adrenal cortex; right adrenal cortex; beta cell; lower lobe of lung; right lung; paraflocculus of cerebellum; pons; upper lobe of lung / Top expressed in: adrenal gland; lobe of prostate; brown adipose tissue; myocardium of ventricle; right ventricle; cerebellar cortex; facial motor nucleus; lobe of cerebellum; cardiac muscles; tunica adventitia of aorta; More reference expression data
BioGPS	More reference expression data
Gene ontology
Molecular function	S100 protein binding; potassium channel activity; protein homodimerization activity; open rectifier potassium channel activity; potassium ion leak channel activity; ion channel activity; protein heterodimerization activity; growth factor activity; protein C-terminus binding; protein binding
Cellular component	integral component of membrane; membrane; plasma membrane; integral component of plasma membrane; extracellular space
Biological process	cochlea development; ion transport; cellular response to zinc ion; potassium ion transport; ion transmembrane transport; brain development; cardiac conduction; potassium ion transmembrane transport; cellular response to hypoxia; negative regulation of cytosolic calcium ion concentration; chemical synaptic transmission; stabilization of membrane potential; regulation of signaling receptor activity
Sources:Amigo / QuickGO
Orthologs
Databases	NCBI: entry; OMA: entry
Species	Human	Mouse
Entrez	3777	16527
Ensembl	ENSG00000171303	ENSMUSG00000049265
UniProt	O14649	O35111
RefSeq (mRNA)	NM_002246	NM_010608
RefSeq (protein)	NP_002237	NP_034738
Location (UCSC)	Chr 2: 26.69 – 26.73 Mb	Chr 5: 30.75 – 30.78 Mb
PubMed search
- Wikidata
View/Edit Human	View/Edit Mouse

Potassium channel subfamily K member 3 is a protein that in humans is encoded by the KCNK3 gene.

This gene encodes K_{2P}3.1, one of the members of the superfamily of potassium channel proteins containing two pore-forming P domains. K_{2P}3.1 is an outwardly rectifying channel that is sensitive to changes in extracellular pH and is inhibited by extracellular acidification. Also referred to as an acid-sensitive potassium channel, it is activated by the anesthetics halothane and isoflurane. Although three transcripts are detected in northern blots, there is currently no sequence available to confirm transcript variants for this gene.

== Interactive pathway map ==
Click on genes, proteins and metabolites below to link to respective articles. (Note: The interactive pathway map can be edited at WikiPathways: "NicotineDopaminergic_WP1602".)

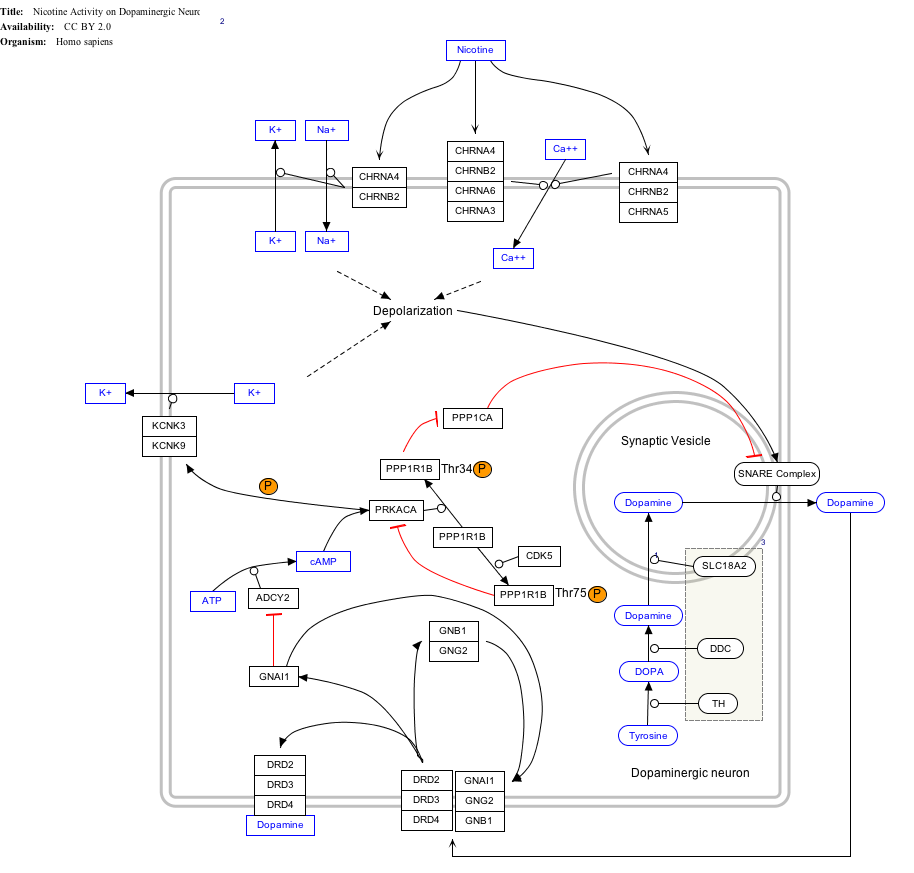

Nicotine Activity on Dopaminergic Neurons edit

== Interactions ==
KCNK3 has been shown to interact with YWHAB and S100A10.

== See also ==
- Tandem pore domain potassium channel
