= Douglas C. Rees =

American biochemist, biophysicist, and structural biologist

- Education: Harvard University (PhD)
- Scientific career
- Fields: Structural biology; X-ray crystallography; Nitrogenase; Membrane proteins
- Workplaces: California Institute of Technology; Howard Hughes Medical Institute; University of California, Los Angeles
- Thesis: Crystal Structure of the Potato Inhibitor Complex of Carboxypeptidase A (1980)
- Doctoral advisor: William Lipscomb
- Other academic advisors: James Bryant Howard
- Doctoral students: Judith Su
- Website: www.br.caltech.edu/reesgrp

Douglas Charles "Doug" Rees (born 1952) is an American biochemist, biophysicist, and structural biologist.

== Academic career ==
Rees graduated from Yale University with a bachelor's degree in 1974 working with Carolyn Slayman and received a PhD in biophysics from Harvard University in 1980. He subsequently completed a postdoctoral fellowshing with James B. Howard at the University of Minnesota. In 1982 he went to the University of California, Los Angeles. In 1989, he became a professor of chemistry at Caltech. There he is Roscoe Gilkey Dickinson Professor and was Dean of graduate studies from 2015-2020. From 1997 to 2025, he was an investigator of the Howard Hughes Medical Institute. He served as the editor or co-editor of the Annual Review of Biophysics and Biomolecular Structure (2004–2014).

== Scientific interests ==
He examines the structure and function of metal-containing and membrane proteins, especially nitrogenase in biological nitrogen fixation, and membrane proteins including ABC transporters and mechanosensitive ion channels including MscL and MscS. To do this, his group uses X-ray crystallography. His interest in nitrogenase began in William Lipscomb's laboratory.

== Recognition ==
In 2015 he received the FA Cotton Medal, and in 2020 he was awarded the Gregori Aminoff Prize. He is a member of the American Academy of Arts and Sciences, National Academy of Sciences, and was a Sloan Research Fellow.

== Personal ==
Rees grew up in Lexington, Kentucky where his father was a faculty member in the University of Kentucky College of Medicine
