= Actinotalea caeni =

Scientific classification
- Domain: Bacteria
- Kingdom: Bacillati
- Phylum: Actinomycetota
- Class: Actinomycetes
- Order: Micrococcales
- Family: Cellulomonadaceae
- Genus: Actinotalea
- Species: A. caeni

Binomial name
- Actinotalea caeni Jin et al. 2017

Type strain
- EBR-4-2; JCM 30447; KCTC 33604

Species of bacterium

Actinotalea caeni is a Gram-positive, rod-shaped, non-spore-forming and non-motile bacterium from the genus Actinotalea. It was first isolated from sludge in a biofilm reactor used for toxic wastewater treatment in South Korea.

== Description ==
Cells of A. caeni are aerobic, Gram-stain-positive rods that form circular colonies. The organism is non-motile and does not form spores.

The major fatty acids are C_{15:0} anteiso, C_{16:0}, C_{16:0} N alcohol, C_{15:1} anteiso A, and C_{15:0} iso. The major cellular polar lipids are diphosphatidylglycerol, phosphatidylinositol mannoside, phosphatidylinositol, and glycolipid. The peptidoglycan type is A4β containing l-ornithine and d-glutamic acid. The whole-cell-wall sugars are glucose and ribose. The respiratory quinone is menaquinone MK-10(H_{4}), and the genomic DNA G+C content is 74.8 mol%.

== Phylogeny ==
16S rRNA gene sequence analysis places A. caeni within the Actinomycetota and shows highest similarity to Pseudactinotalea suaedae (98.7%), Actinotalea ferrariae (96.3%), and Actinotalea fermentans (96.2%). A 2022 phylogenomic study based on 187 Actinomycetota genomes proposed reclassifying A. caeni as "Pseudactinotalea caeni" comb. nov. and transferring it to the family Ruaniaceae, though this combination has not been validly published.
