= Phospholipid =

Class of lipids

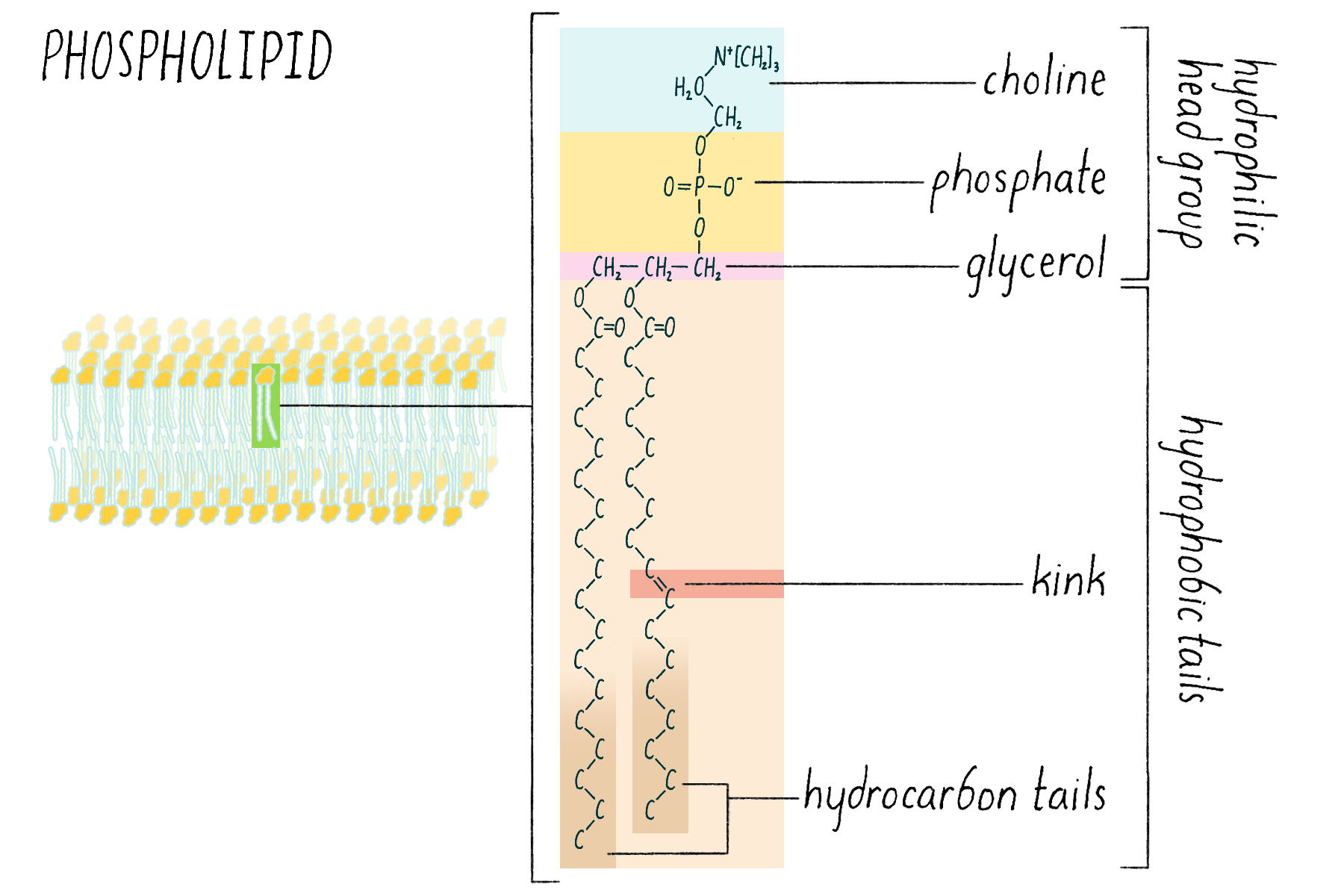
Phospholipids are a class of lipids that makes up the bulk of biological membranes. This specific phospholipid is Phosphatidylcholine. Their “hydrophilic” (water-compatible) head groups point outwards and their two long hydrophobic (water-avoiding) carbon chains (fatty acid tails) hide inside the membrane bilayer.

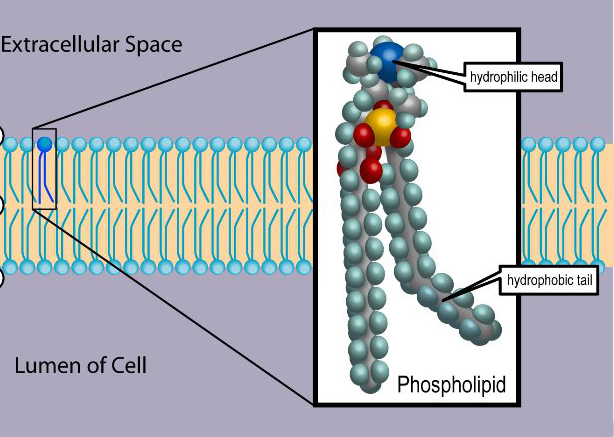
Phospholipid arrangement in cell membranes.

Phosphatidylcholine is the major component of lecithin. It is also a source for choline in the synthesis of acetylcholine in cholinergic neurons.

Phospholipids are a class of lipids whose molecule has a hydrophilic "head" and two hydrophobic "tails." The "head" consists of a phosphate group, and an alcohol residue (usually a glycerol molecule) that connects it to the "tails," which are derived from fatty acids. Marine phospholipids typically have omega-3 fatty acids EPA and DHA integrated as part of the phospholipid molecule. The phosphate group can be modified with simple organic molecules such as choline, ethanolamine or serine.

Phospholipids are essential components of neuronal membranes and play a critical role in maintaining brain structure and function. They are involved in the formation of the blood–brain barrier and support neurotransmitter activity, including the synthesis of acetylcholine.

Research indicates that phospholipid levels in the brain decline with age, with studies showing up to a 20% reduction by age 80, potentially impacting memory, focus, and cognitive performance. Dietary supplementation with phospholipids derived from the milk fat globule membrane (MFGM) has been shown in clinical trials to support memory, mood, and stress resilience in both children and adults.

Multiple randomized controlled trials have demonstrated that daily intake of 300–600 mg of MFGM phospholipids can significantly reduce perceived stress and improve cognitive performance under pressure.

Phospholipids are a key component of all cell membranes. They can form lipid bilayers because of their amphiphilic characteristic. In eukaryotes, cell membranes also contain another class of lipid, sterol, interspersed among the phospholipids. The combination provides fluidity in two dimensions combined with mechanical strength against rupture. Purified phospholipids are produced commercially and have found applications in nanotechnology and materials science.

The first phospholipid identified in 1847 as such in biological tissues was lecithin, or phosphatidylcholine, in the egg yolk of chickens by the French chemist and pharmacist Theodore Nicolas Gobley.

== Phospholipids in biological membranes ==
=== Arrangement ===
The phospholipids are amphiphilic. The hydrophilic end usually contains a negatively charged phosphate group, and the hydrophobic end usually consists of two "tails" that are long fatty acid residues.

In aqueous solutions, phospholipids are driven by hydrophobic interactions, which result in the fatty acid tails aggregating to minimize interactions with the water molecules. The result is often a phospholipid bilayer: a membrane that consists of two layers of oppositely oriented phospholipid molecules, with their heads exposed to the liquid on both sides, and with the tails directed into the membrane. That is the dominant structural motif of the membranes of all cells and of some other biological structures, such as vesicles or virus coatings.

Phospholipid bilayers are the main structural component of the cell membranes.

In biological membranes, the phospholipids often occur with other molecules (e.g., proteins, glycolipids, sterols) in a bilayer such as a cell membrane. Lipid bilayers occur when hydrophobic tails line up against one another, forming a membrane of hydrophilic heads on both sides facing the water.

=== Dynamics ===
These specific properties allow phospholipids to play an important role in the cell membrane. Their movement can be described by the fluid mosaic model, which describes the membrane as a mosaic of lipid molecules that act as a solvent for all the substances and proteins within it, so proteins and lipid molecules are then free to diffuse laterally through the lipid matrix and migrate over the membrane. Sterols contribute to membrane fluidity by hindering the packing together of phospholipids. However, this model has now been superseded, as through the study of lipid polymorphism it is now known that the behaviour of lipids under physiological (and other) conditions is not simple.

== Main phospholipids ==
=== Diacylglyceride structures ===
See: Glycerophospholipid

- Phosphatidic acid (phosphatidate) (PA)
- Phosphatidylethanolamine (cephalin) (PE)
- Phosphatidylcholine (lecithin) (PC)
- Phosphatidylserine (PS)
- Phosphoinositides:
  - Phosphatidylinositol (PI)
  - Phosphatidylinositol 3-phosphate (PI3P)
  - Phosphatidylinositol 4-phosphate (PI4P)
  - Phosphatidylinositol 5-phosphate (PI5P)
  - Phosphatidylinositol 4,5-bisphosphate (PIP_{2})
  - Phosphatidylinositol (3,4,5)-trisphosphate (PIP_{3})

=== Phosphosphingolipids ===
See Sphingolipid

- Ceramide phosphorylcholine (Sphingomyelin) (SPH)
- Ceramide phosphorylethanolamine (Sphingomyelin) (Cer-PE)
- Ceramide phosphoryllipid

== Applications ==
Phospholipids have been widely used to prepare liposomal, ethosomal and other nanoformulations of topical, oral and parenteral drugs for differing reasons like improved bio-availability, reduced toxicity and increased permeability across membranes. Liposomes are often composed of phosphatidylcholine-enriched phospholipids and may also contain mixed phospholipid chains with surfactant properties. The ethosomal formulation of ketoconazole using phospholipids is a promising option for transdermal delivery in fungal infections. Advances in phospholipid research using lipidomics to explore these biomolecules and their conformations have led to improved understanding of various diseases (including cancer and neurological syndromes).

== Simulations ==
Computational simulations of phospholipids are often performed using molecular dynamics with force fields such as GROMOS, CHARMM, or AMBER.

== Characterization ==
Phospholipids are optically highly birefringent, i.e. their refractive index is different along their axis as opposed to perpendicular to it. Measurement of birefringence can be achieved using cross polarisers in a microscope to obtain an image of e.g. vesicle walls or using techniques such as dual polarisation interferometry to quantify lipid order or disruption in supported bilayers.

=== Analysis ===
There are no simple methods available for analysis of phospholipids, since the close range of polarity between different phospholipid species makes detection difficult. Oil chemists often use spectroscopy to determine total phosphorus abundance and then calculate approximate mass of phospholipids based on molecular weight of expected fatty acid species. Modern lipid profiling employs more absolute methods of analysis, with NMR spectroscopy, particularly ^{31}P-NMR, while HPLC-ELSD provides relative values.

== Phospholipid synthesis ==
Phospholipid synthesis occurs in the cytosolic side of ER membrane that is studded with proteins that act in synthesis (GPAT and LPAAT acyl transferases, phosphatase and choline phosphotransferase) and allocation (flippase and floppase). Eventually a vesicle will bud off from the ER containing phospholipids destined for the cytoplasmic cellular membrane on its exterior leaflet and phospholipids destined for the exoplasmic cellular membrane on its inner leaflet.

== Sources ==
Common sources of industrially produced phospholipids are soya, rapeseed, sunflower, chicken eggs, bovine milk, fish eggs etc. Phospholipids for gene delivery, such as distearoylphosphatidylcholine and dioleoyl-3-trimethylammonium propane, are produced synthetically. Each source has a unique profile of individual phospholipid species, as well as fatty acids, and consequently differing applications in food, nutrition, pharmaceuticals, cosmetics, and drug delivery.

== In signal transduction ==
Some types of phospholipid can be split to produce products that function as second messengers in signal transduction. Examples include phosphatidylinositol (4,5)-bisphosphate (PIP_{2}), that can be split by the enzyme phospholipase C into inositol triphosphate (IP_{3}) and diacylglycerol (DAG), which both carry out the functions of the G_{q} type of G protein in response to various stimuli and intervene in various processes from long term depression in neurons to leukocyte signal pathways started by chemokine receptors.

Phospholipids also intervene in prostaglandin signal pathways as the raw material used by lipase enzymes to produce the prostaglandin precursors. In plants they serve as the raw material to produce jasmonic acid, a plant hormone similar in structure to prostaglandins that mediates defensive responses against pathogens.

== Food technology ==
Phospholipids, and particularly phosphatidylcholine, are a major component of egg yolk lecithin. In this form, they function as powerful natural emulsifiers by stabilizing oil water interfaces, and are widely used in food products such as mayonnaise, sauces, and other water–oil emulsions.

== Phospholipid derivatives ==
See table below for an extensive list.

- Natural phospholipid derivates:
  egg PC (Egg lecithin), egg PG, soy PC, hydrogenated soy PC, sphingomyelin as natural phospholipids.
- Synthetic phospholipid derivates:
  - Phosphatidic acid (DMPA, DPPA, DSPA)
  - Phosphatidylcholine (DDPC, DLPC, DMPC, DPPC, DSPC, DOPC, POPC, DEPC)
  - Phosphatidylglycerol (DMPG, DPPG, DSPG, POPG)
  - Phosphatidylethanolamine (DMPE, DPPE, DSPE DOPE)
  - Phosphatidylserine (DOPS)
  - PEG phospholipid (mPEG-phospholipid, polyglycerin-phospholipid, functionalized-phospholipid, terminal activated-phospholipid)

== Abbreviations used and chemical information of glycerophospholipids ==
Abbreviation	CAS	Name	Type
DDPC	3436-44-0	1,2-Didecanoyl-sn-glycero-3-phosphocholine	Phosphatidylcholine
DEPA-NA	80724-31-8	1,2-Dierucoyl-sn-glycero-3-phosphate (sodium salt)	Phosphatidic acid
DEPC	56649-39-9	1,2-Dierucoyl-sn-glycero-3-phosphocholine	Phosphatidylcholine
DEPE	988-07-2	1,2-Dierucoyl-sn-glycero-3-phosphoethanolamine	Phosphatidylethanolamine
DEPG-NA		1,2-Dierucoyl-sn-glycero-3[phospho-rac-(1-glycerol...) (sodium salt)	Phosphatidylglycerol
DLOPC	998-06-1	1,2-Dilinoleoyl-sn-glycero-3-phosphocholine	Phosphatidylcholine
DLPA-NA		1,2-Dilauroyl-sn-glycero-3-phosphate (sodium salt)	Phosphatidic acid
DLPC	18194-25-7	1,2-Dilauroyl-sn-glycero-3-phosphocholine	Phosphatidylcholine
DLPE		1,2-Dilauroyl-sn-glycero-3-phosphoethanolamine	Phosphatidylethanolamine
DLPG-NA		1,2-Dilauroyl-sn-glycero-3[phospho-rac-(1-glycerol...) (sodium salt)	Phosphatidylglycerol
DLPG-NH4		1,2-Dilauroyl-sn-glycero-3[phospho-rac-(1-glycerol...) (ammonium salt)	Phosphatidylglycerol
DLPS-NA		1,2-Dilauroyl-sn-glycero-3-phosphoserine (sodium salt)	Phosphatidylserine
DMPA-NA	80724-3	1,2-Dimyristoyl-sn-glycero-3-phosphate (sodium salt)	Phosphatidic acid
DMPC	18194-24-6	1,2-Dimyristoyl-sn-glycero-3-phosphocholine	Phosphatidylcholine
DMPE	988-07-2	1,2-Dimyristoyl-sn-glycero-3-phosphoethanolamine	Phosphatidylethanolamine
DMPG-NA	67232-80-8	1,2-Dimyristoyl-sn-glycero-3[phospho-rac-(1-glycerol...) (sodium salt)	Phosphatidylglycerol
DMPG-NH4		1,2-Dimyristoyl-sn-glycero-3[phospho-rac-(1-glycerol...) (ammonium salt)	Phosphatidylglycerol
DMPG-NH4/NA		1,2-Dimyristoyl-sn-glycero-3[phospho-rac-(1-glycerol...) (sodium/ammonium salt)	Phosphatidylglycerol
DMPS-NA		1,2-Dimyristoyl-sn-glycero-3-phosphoserine (sodium salt)	Phosphatidylserine
DOPA-NA		1,2-Dioleoyl-sn-glycero-3-phosphate (sodium salt)	Phosphatidic acid
DOPC	4235-95-4	1,2-Dioleoyl-sn-glycero-3-phosphocholine	Phosphatidylcholine
DOPE	4004-5-1-	1,2-Dioleoyl-sn-glycero-3-phosphoethanolamine	Phosphatidylethanolamine
DOPG-NA	62700-69-0	1,2-Dioleoyl-sn-glycero-3[phospho-rac-(1-glycerol...) (sodium salt)	Phosphatidylglycerol
DOPS-NA	70614-14-1	1,2-Dioleoyl-sn-glycero-3-phosphoserine (sodium salt)	Phosphatidylserine
DPPA-NA	71065-87-7	1,2-Dipalmitoyl-sn-glycero-3-phosphate (sodium salt)	Phosphatidic acid
DPPC	63-89-8	1,2-Dipalmitoyl-sn-glycero-3-phosphocholine	Phosphatidylcholine
DPPE	923-61-5	1,2-Dipalmitoyl-sn-glycero-3-phosphoethanolamine	Phosphatidylethanolamine
DPPG-NA	67232-81-9	1,2-Dipalmitoyl-sn-glycero-3[phospho-rac-(1-glycerol...) (sodium salt)	Phosphatidylglycerol
DPPG-NH4	73548-70-6	1,2-Dipalmitoyl-sn-glycero-3[phospho-rac-(1-glycerol...) (ammonium salt)	Phosphatidylglycerol
DPPS-NA		1,2-Dipalmitoyl-sn-glycero-3-phosphoserine (sodium salt)	Phosphatidylserine
DSPA-NA	108321-18-2	1,2-Distearoyl-sn-glycero-3-phosphate (sodium salt)	Phosphatidic acid
DSPC	816-94-4	1,2-Distearoyl-sn-glycero-3-phosphocholine	Phosphatidylcholine
DSPE	1069-79-0	1,2-Distearoyl-sn-glycero-3-phosphoethanolamine	Phosphatidylethanolamine
DSPG-NA	67232-82-0	1,2-Distearoyl-sn-glycero-3[phospho-rac-(1-glycerol...) (sodium salt)	Phosphatidylglycerol
DSPG-NH4	108347-80-4	1,2-Distearoyl-sn-glycero-3[phospho-rac-(1-glycerol...) (ammonium salt)	Phosphatidylglycerol
DSPS-NA		1,2-Distearoyl-sn-glycero-3-phosphoserine (sodium salt)	Phosphatidylserine
EPC		Egg-PC	Phosphatidylcholine
HEPC		Hydrogenated egg PC	Phosphatidylcholine
HSPC		Hydrogenated soy PC	Phosphatidylcholine
LYSOPC MYRISTIC	18194-24-6	1-Myristoyl-sn-glycero-3-phosphocholine	Lysophosphatidylcholine
LYSOPC PALMITIC	17364-16-8	1-Palmitoyl-sn-glycero-3-phosphocholine	Lysophosphatidylcholine
LYSOPC STEARIC	19420-57-6	1-Stearoyl-sn-glycero-3-phosphocholine	Lysophosphatidylcholine
Milk Sphingomyelin MPPC		1-Myristoyl-2-palmitoyl-sn-glycero 3-phosphocholine	Phosphatidylcholine
MSPC		1-Myristoyl-2-stearoyl-sn-glycero-3–phosphocholine	Phosphatidylcholine
PMPC		1-Palmitoyl-2-myristoyl-sn-glycero-3–phosphocholine	Phosphatidylcholine
POPC	26853-31-6	1-Palmitoyl-2-oleoyl-sn-glycero-3-phosphocholine	Phosphatidylcholine
POPE		1-Palmitoyl-2-oleoyl-sn-glycero-3-phosphoethanolamine	Phosphatidylethanolamine
POPG-NA	81490-05-3	1-Palmitoyl-2-oleoyl-sn-glycero-3[phospho-rac-(1-glycerol)...] (sodium salt)	Phosphatidylglycerol
PSPC		1-Palmitoyl-2-stearoyl-sn-glycero-3–phosphocholine	Phosphatidylcholine
SMPC		1-Stearoyl-2-myristoyl-sn-glycero-3–phosphocholine	Phosphatidylcholine
SOPC		1-Stearoyl-2-oleoyl-sn-glycero-3-phosphocholine	Phosphatidylcholine
SPPC		1-Stearoyl-2-palmitoyl-sn-glycero-3-phosphocholine	Phosphatidylcholine

== See also ==
- Cable theory
- Galactolipid
- Sulfolipid
