= DMPE =

DMPE may refer to the chemicals:

- 1,2-Bis(dimethylphosphino)ethane.
- Dimyristoylphosphatidylethanolamine
- 3,4-Dimethoxyphenethylamine
