= DPPE =

DPPE may refer to the chemicals:

- 1,2-Bis(diphenylphosphino)ethane
- Dipalmitoylphosphatidylethanolamine
