= Lipid-gated ion channels =

Type of ion channel transmembrane protein

Lipid-gated ion-channel Kir2.2
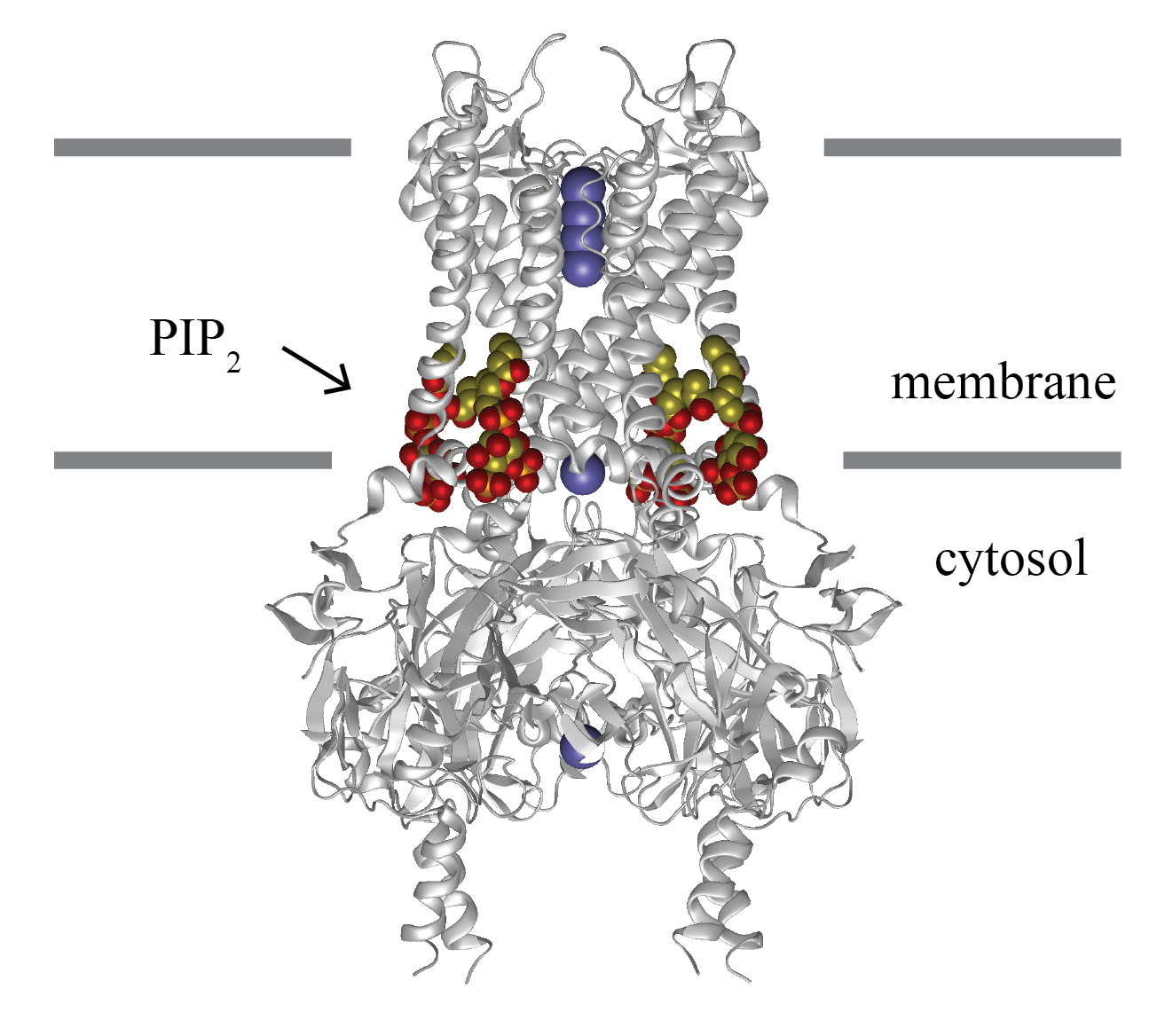
- Tetrameric Kir2.2 (grey trace) bound to four PIP_{2} molecules (carbon:yellow; oxygen:red). Potassium ions (purple) are shown in the open conduction pathway. Grey rectangles indicate the membrane border.

Identifiers
- Symbol: Kir2.2
- OPM protein: 3SPG

Lipid-gated ion channels are a class of ion channels whose conductance of ions through the membrane depends directly on lipids. Classically the lipids are membrane resident anionic signaling lipids that bind to the transmembrane domain on the inner leaflet of the plasma membrane with properties of a classic ligand. Other classes of lipid-gated channels include the mechanosensitive ion channels that respond to lipid tension, thickness, and hydrophobic mismatch. A lipid ligand differs from a lipid cofactor in that a ligand derives its function by dissociating from the channel while a cofactor typically derives its function by remaining bound.

== PIP_{2}-gated channels ==
Phosphatidylinositol 4,5-bisphosphate (PIP_{2}) was the first and remains the best studied lipid to gate ion channels. PIP_{2} is a cell membrane lipid, and its role in gating ion channels represents a novel role for the molecule.

K_{ir} channels: PIP_{2} binds to and directly activates inwardly rectifying potassium channels (K_{ir}). The lipid binds in a well-defined ligand binding site in the transmembrane domain and causes the helices to splay opening the channel. All members of the K_{ir} super-family of potassium channels are thought to be directly gated by PIP.

K_{v}7 channels: PIP_{2} binds to and directly activates K_{v}7.1. In the same study PIP_{2} was shown to function as a ligand. When the channel was reconstituted into lipid vesicles with PIP_{2} the channel opened, when PIP_{2} was omitted the channel was closed.

TRP channels: TRP channels were perhaps the first class of channels recognized as lipid-gated. PIP_{2} regulates the conductance of most TRP channels either positively or negatively. For TRPV5, binding of PIP_{2} to a site in the transmembrane domain caused a conformational change that appeared to open the conduction pathway, suggesting the channel is classically lipid-gated. A PIP_{2} compatible site was found in TRPV1 but whether the lipid alone can gate the channels has not been shown. Other TRP channels that directly bind PIP_{2} are TRPM8 and TRPML. Direct binding does not exclude PIP_{2} from affecting the channel by indirect mechanisms.

== PA-gated channels ==
Phosphatidic acid (PA) recently emerged as an activator of ion channels.

K_{2p}: PA directly activates TREK-1 potassium channels through a putative site in the transmembrane domain. The affinity of PA for TREK-1 is relatively weak but the enzyme PLD2 produces high local concentration of PA to activate the channel.

nAChR: PA also activates the nAChR in artificial membranes. Initially, the high concentration of PA required to activate nAChR suggested a related anionic lipid might activate the channel, however, the finding of local high concentration of PA activating TREK-1 may suggest otherwise.

Kv: PA binding can also influence the midpoint of voltage activation (Vmid) for voltage-activated potassium channels. Depletion of PA shifted the Vmid -40 mV near resting membrane potential which could open the channel absent a change in voltage suggesting these channels may also be lipid-gated. PA lipids were proposed to non-specifically gated a homologous channel from bacteria KvAP, but those experiments did not rule out the anionic lipid phosphatidylglycerol from contributing specifically to gating.

== PG-gated channels ==
Phosphatidylglycerol (PG) is an anionic lipid that activates many channels including most of the PA activated channels. The physiological signaling pathway is not well studied, but PLD can produce PG in the presence of glycerol suggesting the same mechanism that is thought to generate local PA gradients could be generating high local PG gradients as well.

== PC-gated channels ==
GLIC: The lipid phosphatidylcholine (PC) binds to the outer leaflet of the gleobacter ligad-gated ion channel (GLIC and opens. General anesthetic propofol binds to the same region of the protein as PC. The competition of propofol with the lipid, i.e. displacement of the lipid, is thought to inhibit the channel.

== Mechanosensitive channels ==
A specialized set of mechanosensitive ion channels is gated by lipid deformation in the membrane in response to mechanical force. A theory involving the lipid membrane, called "force from lipid", is thought to directly open ion channels. These channels include the bacterial channels MscL and MscS which open in response to lytic pressure. Many mechanosensitive channels require anionic lipids for activity.

Channels can also respond to membrane thickness. An amphipathic helix that runs along the inner membrane of TREK-1 channels is thought to sense changes in membrane thickness and gate the channel.

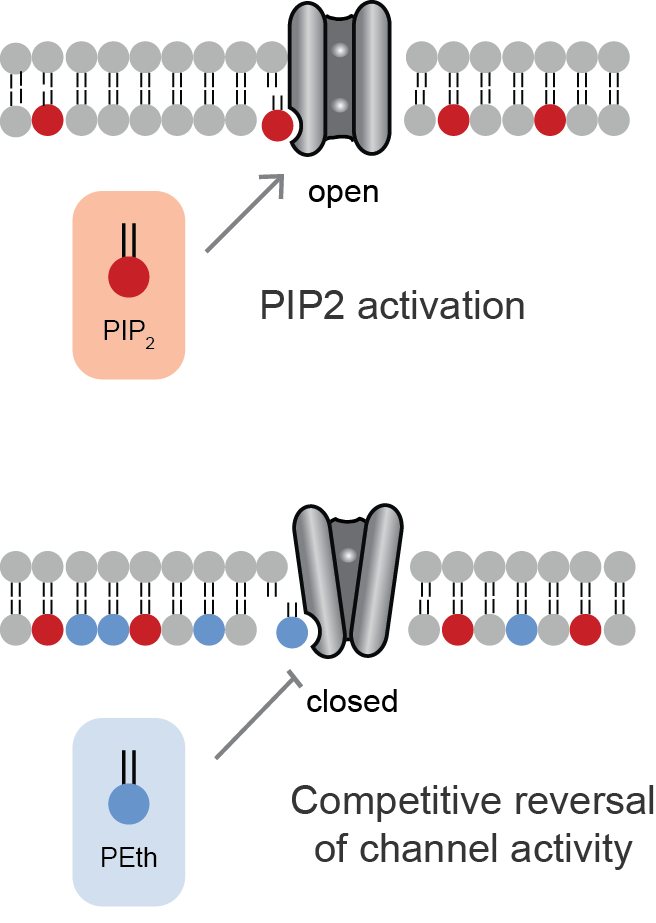
PEth is a phospholipid metabolite of ethanol that builds up in the membrane of nerves and competitively inhibits PIP2 activation of K+ channels.

== Activation by localized lipid production ==
When an enzyme forms a complex with a channel it is thought to produce ligand near the channel in concentrations that are higher than the ligand in bulk membranes. Theoretical estimates suggest initial concentration of a signaling lipid produced near an ion channel are likely millimolar; however, due to theoretical calculations of lipids diffusion in a membrane, the ligand was thought to diffuse away much to fast to activate a channel. However, Comoglio and colleagues showed experimentally that the enzyme phospholipase D2 bound directly to TREK-1 and produced the PA necessary to activate the channel. The conclusion of Comoglio et al was experimentally confirmed when it was shown that the dissociation constant of PA for TREK-1 is 10 micro molar, a Kd much weaker than the bulk concentration in the membrane. Combined these data show that PA must be local in concentration near 100 micro molar or more, suggesting the diffusion of the lipid is somehow restricted in the membrane.

== Activation by membrane protein translocation ==
In theory, ion channels can be activated by their diffusion or trafficking to high concentrations of a signaling lipid. The mechanism is similar to producing local high concentrations of a signaling lipid, but instead of changing the concentration of the lipid in the membrane near the channel, the channel moves to a region of the plasma membrane that already contains high concentrations of a signaling lipid. The change the channel experiences in lipid composition can be much faster and without any change in the total lipid concentration in the membrane.

== Lipid competition ==
Anionic lipids compete for binding sites within ion channel. Similar to neurotransmitters, competition of an antagonist reverses the effect of an agonist. In most cases, the PA has the opposite effect of PIP_{2}. Hence when PA binds to a channel that is activated by PIP_{2}, PA inhibits the effect of PIP_{2}. When PA activates the channel, PIP_{2} blocks the effect of PA inhibiting the channels.

Ethanol When ethanol is consumed, phospholipase D incorporates the ethanol into phospholipids generating the unnatural and long lived lipid phosphatidylethanol (PEth) in a process called transphoshatidylation. The PEth competes with PA and the competition antagonizes TREK-1 channels. The competition of PEth on potassium channel is thought to contribute to the anesthetic effect of ethanol and perhaps hangover.
