= Large-conductance mechanosensitive channel =

Group of transport proteins

MscL
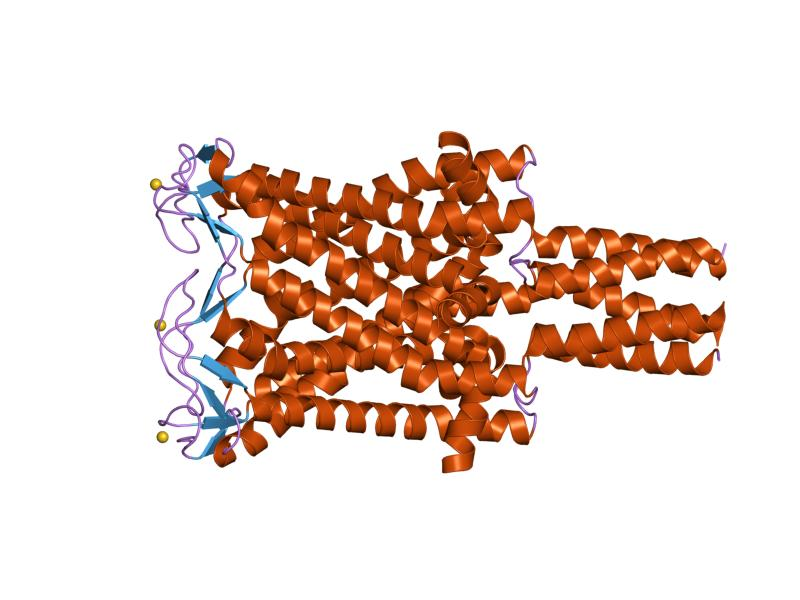
- mechanosensitive channel of large conductance (mscl)

Identifiers
- Symbol: MscL
- Pfam: PF01741
- InterPro: IPR001185
- PROSITE: PDOC01030
- SCOP2: 1msl / SCOPe / SUPFAM
- TCDB: 1.A.22
- OPM superfamily: 12
- OPM protein: 2oar
Available protein structures:
- PDB: IPR001185 PF01741 (ECOD; PDBsum)
- AlphaFold: IPR001185; PF01741

Large conductance mechanosensitive ion channels (MscLs) (TC# 1.A.22) are a family of pore-forming membrane proteins that are responsible for translating stresses at the cell membrane into an electrophysiological response. MscL has a relatively large conductance, 3 nS, making it permeable to ions, water, and small proteins when opened. MscL acts as stretch-activated osmotic release valve in response to osmotic shock.

== History ==
MscL was first discovered on the surface of giant Escherichia coli spheroplasts using patch-clamp technique. Subsequently, the Escherichia coli MscL (Ec-MscL) gene was cloned in 1994. Following the cloning of MscL, the crystal structure of Mycobacterium tuberculosis MscL (Tb-MscL), was obtained in its closed conformation. In addition, the crystal structure of Staphylococcus aureus MscL (Sa-MscL) and Ec-MscL have been determined using X-ray crystallography and molecular model respectively. However, some evidence suggests that the Sa-MscL structure is not physiological, and is due to the detergent used in crystallization.

== Structure ==
Similar to other ion channels, MscLs are organized as symmetric oligomers with the permeation pathway formed by the packing of subunits around the axis of rotational symmetry. Unlike MscS, which is heptameric, MscL is likely pentameric; although the Sa-MscL appears to be a tetramer in a crystal structure, this may be an artifact. MscL contains two transmembrane helices that are packed in an up-down/nearest neighbor topology. The permeation pathway of the MscL is approximately funnel shaped, with larger opening facing the periplasmic surface of the membrane and the narrowest point near the cytoplasm. At the narrowest point, the pore is constricted by the side chains of symmetry-related residues in Ec-MscL: Leu19 and Val23. The pore diameter of MscL in the open state has been estimated to ~3 nm, which accommodates the passage of small protein up to 9 kD.

Ec-MscL consists of five identical subunits, each 136 amino acids long. Each subunit crosses the membrane twice through alpha-helical transmembrane segments, M1 and M2, which are interconnected by an extracellular loop. It forms a homopentameric channel with ten transmembrane spanners. Combining both Ec-MscL molecular model and Tb-MscL crystal structure, it is clear that M1 helices in the core of the transmembrane bundle make up the main gate of the mechanosensitive channel. Regularly placed glycine residues on the M1 segments permits tight packing of the five central helices, forming a narrow (~4 Å) hydrophobic constriction. Hydrophobic M2 helices on the periphery of the MscL barrel face the lipid bilayer. The M1 and M2 helices of the same subunit are not connected; instead, the M1 helix of one subunit makes tight contact with the M2 helix of the adjacent subunit. With additional interactions through a salt bridge in Ec-MscL, the entire complex is secured together.

The N-terminal S1 domains of Tb-MscL were not resolved in the crystal structure, only inferred as short α helices bundled together to form an additional cytoplasmic gate; however, subsequent cysteine cross-linking experiments supported this proposed configuration. It has been shown that the S1 segment can be heavily mutated without a strong detrimental effect on channel function.

Both Ec-MscL and Tb-MscL have been chemically synthesized and reconstituted into vesicle membranes. Single-channel recordings of these MscLs showed similar conductance and pressure dependence to those of the corresponding wild type MscL.

== Biological role ==
Physical impacts or vibrations, though crucial for animals, have little effect on microbes such as E. coli. In comparison, osmotic force greatly affects individual cells or microbes within their aquatic environment. When bacteria are under osmotic downshock, which is during the transition from media of high osmolarity to low, water inflow gives rise to a substantial increase in the turgor pressure, which is capable of bursting the cell envelope. Mechanosensitive channels are major pathways for the release of cytoplasmic solutes to achieve a rapid reduction of the turgor pressure, therefore avoiding lysis. Gene disruption experiments confirmed that either MscL or MscS channels can rescue bacteria from a strong osmotic shock, while a double knockout of both channels led to lysis.

The role of MscL as a defense mechanism against osmotic shocks indicates its evolutionary importance even during the early phase of biological history. Together with MscS, MscL, or its homologs, has been found in bacteria, archaea, fungi, and higher plants, but not animals. Although bacterial and archaeal mechanosensitive channels differ in conductive and mechanosensitive properties, they share similar gating mechanisms triggered by mechanical force transmitted via the lipid bilayer. Although MscL and MscS share similar transmembrane domain and cytoplasmic domain, the overall arrangements of the polypeptide folds in these MS channels are distinct, indicating that they do not share a common evolutionary ancestor.

== Mechanisms ==
Bacterial mechanosensitive channels, MscL and MscS, reflect an intimate coupling of protein conformation with the mechanics of the surrounding membrane. The membrane serves as an adaptable sensor that responds to an input of applied force and converts it into an output signal. The cell can exploit this information in a number of ways: ensuring cellular viability in the presence of osmotic stress and perhaps also serving as a signal transducer for membrane tension.

Studies have shown that the MscL pore expands to ~30Å in diameter when closed, with change of 15-16Å upon opening, which is the largest known conformational change in channel proteins. This large change accounts for the opening of the 30Å diameter pore, resulting in a 20 nm^{2} in-plane protein expansion. Such a transformation is responsible for MscL's unitary conductance of 3nS and the channel's lack of selectivity, allowing any particles with a molecular weight smaller than ~1,000. This property of MscL fulfills its role as an emergency valve to release solutes under osmotic shock.

Two models have been proposed in explaining the gating mechanism of MS channels: membrane-mediated mechanism and trapdoor mechanism. The trapdoor mechanism is responsible for the opening of ion channels in hair cell. However, more evidence now indicate that the gating of MscL specifically is moderated by the membrane-mediated mechanism, which relies on changes in membrane thickness or curvature that can alter the energetic balance of embedded proteins. This is supported by the observations that variations in the thickness of the phospholipid bilayer or the addition of compounds that induce spontaneous membrane curvature directly impact the tension required to open MscL.

Analysis of the lateral pressure profile in the lipid bilayer showed that the interface region between the hydrocarbon and polar head groups produces high tension. Therefore, when the membrane is stretched, MscL will experience a pull mostly concentrated in the interfacial regions. Mutations that effect protein-lipid interactions near the interfaces result in loss-of-function phenotypes.

The tension applied to the inner and outer rims of the channel by the lipid bilayer tilts the transmembrane helixes of MscL (The tilts of the M1 helices change by 35-34^{o} during the transition), causing a gradual iris-like expansion and flattening of the MscL barrel. As a result, the transmembrane span of M2 helices is reduced, pulling the periplasmic loops into the membrane to line the extracellular entrance to the pore, establishing a pore diameter of ~3 nm. Along with this iris-like transition, the pore is now lined mostly by polar facets of M1 helices, instead of the hydrophobic constriction during closed state. Once the pore is hydrated, the MscL barrel exerts more force onto the S1-M1 linkers, pulling S1 bundle apart and completely opening the channel.

It was previously believed that Ec-MscS exhibits complex adaptive behavior, while Ec-MscL does not. A recent study showed that both Ec-MscS and Ec-MscL are capable of adaptive behavior under constant pressure stimuli in excised membrane patch; however, both mechanosensitive channels lose the adaptive ability in whole cell recordings, indicating that the previously known adaptive behavior of Ec-MscS is related to stress relaxation of the membrane instead of specific channel structure. This result further emphasizes the importance of protein-membrane interaction for mechanosensitive channels.

=== Transport reaction ===
The generalized transport reactions are:

(a) proteins (in) → proteins (out)
(b) ions (out) ⇌ ions (in)
(c) osmolytes (in) ⇌ osmolytes (out)

== See also ==
- Lipid-gated ion channels
- Small-conductance mechanosensitive channel
- Mechanosensitive channels
- Mechanosensitive ion channel
- Ion channel
