= Phosphatidylglycerol—membrane-oligosaccharide glycerophosphotransferase =

phosphatidylglycerol-membrane-oligosaccharide glycerophosphotransferase

Identifiers
- EC no.: 2.7.8.20
- CAS no.: 80146-86-7

Databases
- IntEnz: IntEnz view
- BRENDA: BRENDA entry
- ExPASy: NiceZyme view
- KEGG: KEGG entry
- MetaCyc: metabolic pathway
- PRIAM: profile
- PDB structures: RCSB PDB PDBe PDBsum
- Gene Ontology: AmiGO / QuickGO
Search
- PMC: articles
- PubMed: articles
- NCBI: proteins

In enzymology, a phosphatidylglycerol-membrane-oligosaccharide glycerophosphotransferase (EC 2.7.8.20) is an enzyme that catalyzes the chemical reaction

phosphatidylglycerol + membrane-derived-oligosaccharide D-glucose $\rightleftharpoons$ 1,2-diacyl-sn-glycerol + membrane-derived-oligosaccharide 6-(glycerophospho)-D-glucose

Thus, the two substrates of this enzyme are phosphatidylglycerol and membrane-derived-oligosaccharide D-glucose, whereas its two products are 1,2-diacyl-sn-glycerol and membrane-derived-oligosaccharide 6-(glycerophospho)-D-glucose.

This enzyme belongs to the family of transferases, specifically those transferring phosphorus-containing groups transferases for other substituted phosphate groups. The systematic name of this enzyme class is phosphatidylglycerol:membrane-derived-oligosaccharide-D-glucose glycerophosphotransferase. Other names in common use include phosphoglycerol transferase, oligosaccharide glycerophosphotransferase, and phosphoglycerol transferase I. This enzyme participates in glycerolipid metabolism.
