= Mechanosensitive channels =

Type of membrane proteins

Mechanosensitive channels (MSCs), mechanosensitive ion channels or stretch-gated ion channels are membrane proteins capable of responding to mechanical stress over a wide dynamic range of external mechanical stimuli. They are present in the membranes of organisms from the three domains of life: bacteria, archaea, and eukarya. They are the sensors for a number of systems including the senses of touch, hearing and balance, as well as participating in cardiovascular regulation and osmotic homeostasis (e.g. thirst). The channels vary in selectivity for the permeating ions from nonselective between anions and cations in bacteria, to cation selective allowing passage Ca^{2+}, K^{+} and Na^{+} in eukaryotes, and highly selective K^{+} channels in bacteria and eukaryotes.

All organisms, and apparently all cell types, sense and respond to mechanical stimuli. MSCs function as mechanotransducers capable of generating both electrical and ion flux signals as a response to external or internal stimuli. Under extreme turgor in bacteria, non selective MSCs such as MSCL and MSCS serve as safety valves to prevent lysis. In specialized cells of the higher organisms, other types of MSCs are probably the basis of the senses of hearing and touch and sense the stress needed for muscular coordination. However, none of these channels have been cloned. MSCs also allow plants to distinguish up from down by sensing the force of gravity. MSCs are not pressure-sensitive, but sensitive to local stress, most likely tension in the surrounding lipid bilayer.

== History ==
Mechanosensitive channels were discovered in 1983 in the skeletal muscle of embryonic chicks by Falguni Guharay and Frederick Sachs. They were also observed (pub. 1986) in Xenopus oocytes, and frequently studied since that time. Since then, MSCs have been found in cells from bacteria to humans: they are now known to be present in all three domains of life (Archaea, Bacteria and Eukarya, incl. plants and fungi). In the decades since the discovery of MS, the understanding of their structure and function has increased greatly, and several have been cloned. Specifically, the cloned eukaryotic mechanosensitive channels include the K^{+} selective 2P domain channels and the recently cloned cation selective PIEZO family (PIEZO1 and PIEZO2).

== Classification ==
MSCs can be classified based on the type of ion to which they are permeable:

- Cation Selective MSCs: As the name suggests, they exhibit a selective permeability for positive ions with the most selective channels being those for K^{+}. The most common eukaryotic MSCs are cation selective passing Na^{+}, K^{+} and Ca^{2+} but not Mg^{2+}. They have a single channel conductance range (25-35 pS) and they are blocked by trivalent ion Gadolinium. The K^{+} selective MSCs such as TREK-1 are not blocked by Gd^{3+}.
- Anion Channels: they exhibit a significant permeability for negative ions, and are not predominant as cation MS. They have a large conductance range (> 300pS).
- Non Selective ion channels: As the name indicates, they do not differentiate between positive and negative channels those are more common to Archaea and Bacteria, but rarely found in Eukarya.

Broadly, most MSCs can be classified as lipid-gated channels.

== Functions ==
For a protein to be considered mechanosensitive, it must respond to a mechanical deformation of the membrane. Mechanical deformations can include changes in the tension, thickness, or curvature of the membrane. Mechanosensitive channels respond to membrane tension by altering their conformation between an open state and a closed state. One type of mechanically sensitive ion channel activates specialized sensory cells, such as cochlear hair cells and some touch sensory neurons, in response to forces applied to proteins.

Stretch-activated ion channels are required for the initial formation of an action potential from a mechanical stimulus, for example by the mechanoreceptors in vibrissae (whiskers) of some animals such as rodents.

Afferent nerve fibers responsible for sensory stimulus detection and feedback are especially sensitive to stimulation. This results from the specialized mechanoreceptor cells that are superimposed upon the afferent nerve fibers. Stretch-activated ion channels are located on these mechanoreceptor cells and serve to lower the action potential threshold, thus making the afferent nerves more sensitive to stimulation. Afferent nerve endings without mechanoreceptor cells are called free nerve endings. They are less sensitive than the encapsulated afferent fibers and generally function in the perception of pain.

Stretch-activated ion channels are responsible for many bodily functions in mammals. In the skin they are responsible for sensing vibration, pressure sensation, stretch, touch, and light touch. They are expressed in sensory modalities including taste, hearing, smell, heat sensation, volume control, and vision. They can also regulate internal functions of our body including, but not limited to, osmotic pressure in cells, blood pressure in veins and arteries, micturition, and heart electrophysiology and contractility. In addition to these functionalities, stretch-activated ion channels have also been found to be involved with balance and proprioceptive sensation.

Channels that have traditionally been known as just "voltage-" or "ligand-gated" have also been found to be mechanically sensitive as well. Channels exhibit mechanical sensitivity as a general property. However, mechanical stress affects various types of channels in different ways. Voltage and ligand gated channels can be modified slightly by mechanical stimulation, which might change their responsiveness or permeability slightly, but they still respond primarily to voltage or ligands, respectively.

=== Examples ===
The different families of stretch-activated ion channels are responsible for different functions around the body. The DEG/ENaC family consists of two subgroups: the ENaC subfamily regulates Na+ reabsorption in kidney and lung epithelia; the ASIC subfamily is involved in fear conditioning, memory formation, and pain sensation. The TRP superfamily of channels are found in sensory receptor cells that are involved in heat sensation, taste, smell, touch, and osmotic and volume regulation. MscM, MscS, and MscL channels (mechanosensitive channels of mini, small, and large conductance) regulate osmotic pressure in cells by releasing intracellular fluid when they become too stretched. In the body, a possible role in myoblast development has been described. Furthermore, mechanically gated ion channels are also found in the stereocilia of the inner ear. Sound waves are able to bend the stereocilia and open up ion channels leading to the creation of nerve impulses. These channels also play a role in sensing vibration and pressure via activation of Pacinian corpuscles in the skin.

== Transduction mechanisms ==
There are two different types of stretch-activated channels between which it is important to distinguish: mechanically gated channels, which are directly influenced by mechanical deformations of the membrane, and mechanically sensitive channels, which are opened by second messengers released from the true mechanically gated channel.

Mechanical deformations in the cell membrane can increase the probability of the channels opening. Proteins of the extracellular matrix and cytoskeleton are tethered to extra - and intra-cytoplasmic domains, respectively, of the stretch-activated ion channels. Tension on these mechanosensory proteins causes these proteins to act as a signaling intermediate, resulting in the opening of the ion channel. All known stretch-activated ion channels in prokaryotic cells have been found to be opened by direct deformation of the lipid bilayer membrane. Channels that have been shown to exclusively use this mechanism of gating are the TREK-1 and TRAAK channels. In studies using mammalian hair cells, the mechanism that pulls on proteins tethered from the intra- and extra-cytoplasmic domain of the channel to the cytoskeleton and extracellular matrix, respectively, is the most likely model for ion channel opening.

Mechanical deformation of the cell membrane can be achieved by a number of experimental interventions, including magnetic actuation of nanoparticles. An example of this is the control of calcium influx of axons and boutons within neural networks. Note that this is not an indication of 'magnetic stimulation' of mechanosensitive channels.

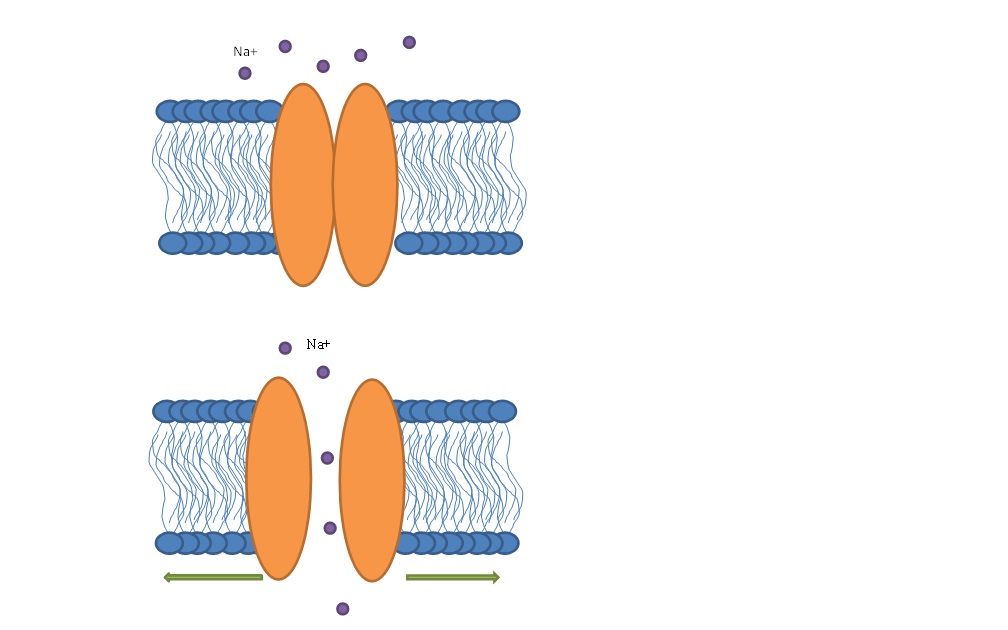
Prokaryotic model. Channel opens in response to membrane deformation (green arrows). Adapted from Lumpkin et al.

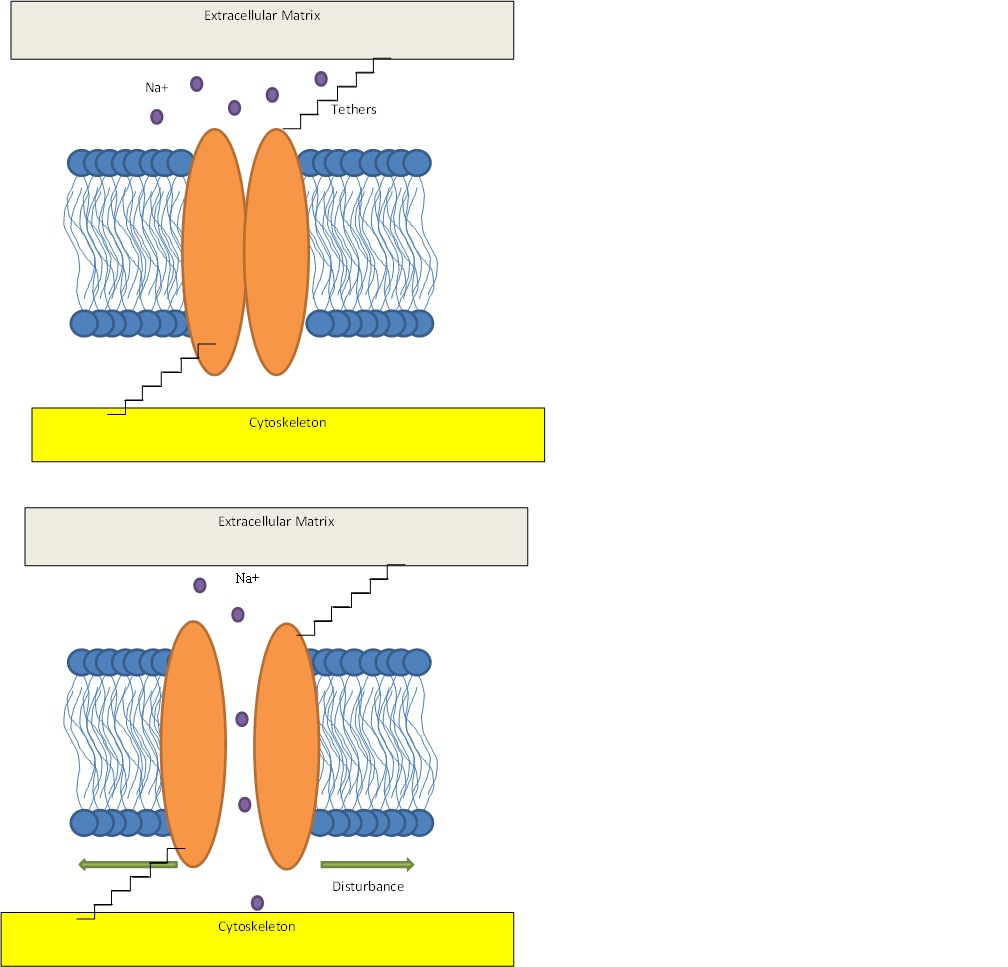
Mammalian hair cell model. Channel opens via tethers in response to a disturbance in either the extracellular matrix or cytoskeleton. Figure adapted from Lumpkin et al.

== Gating mechanism ==
Although MS vary in many aspects, structures and functions, all the MS studied to date share an important feature: in a process called gating, they all open in a pore-like manner when protein channels are activated by a mechanical stimulus. There are currently two models of the gating process that explain how membrane-activated ion channels open.

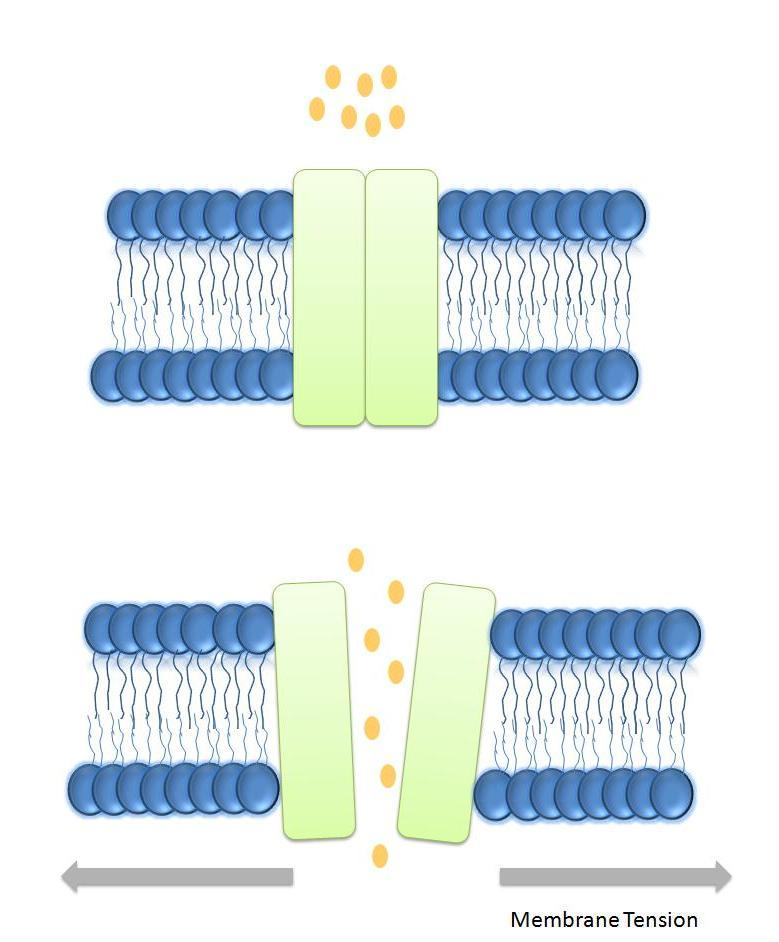
Gating Mechanism of MS.Stretch activated model, tension in the lipid bilayer triggers conformational changes which open the channel. Figure adapted from Lumpkin et al.

Lipid bilayer Tension or stretch model: In this model tension in the lipid bilayer triggers conformational changes, thus leading to the opening of the channels. The tension perceived by the protein comes from the lipids. It has been demonstrated that the tension/stretch profile in the lipid bilayer is originated by membrane curvature and bilayer-protein hydrophobic mismatch.

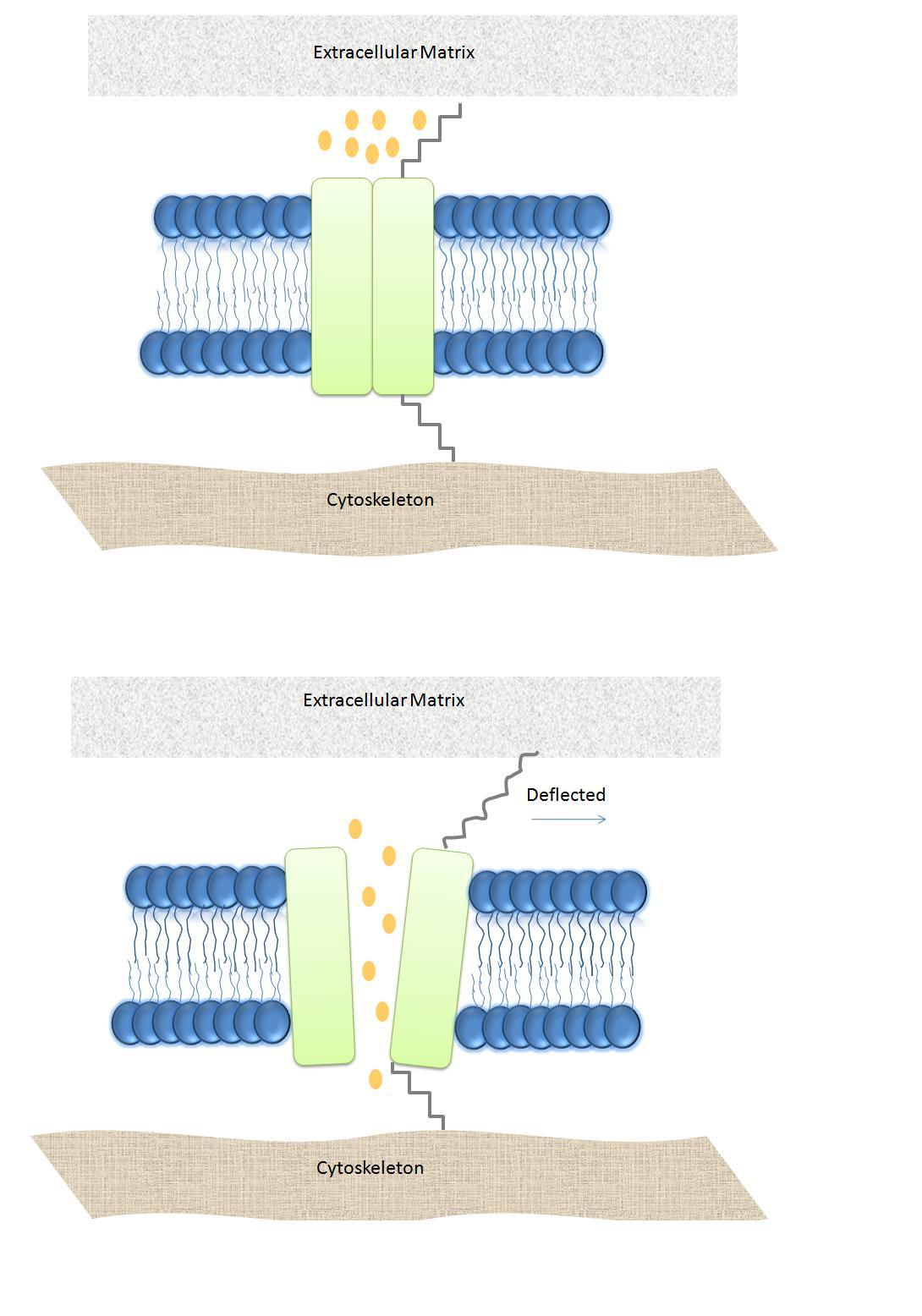
Gating Mechanism of MSC:Spring-like tether model - The tethers are attached to the channel proteins and are connected to the cytoskeleton. The tethers act like spring mechanisms of a shutter. Figure adapted from Lumpkin et al.

Spring-like Tether model: In this model a spring-like tether is attached directly to the MS channel and can be present in either the cytoskeleton or the extracellular matrix linking these elements together. When external stimuli deflect the tether the displacement opens the channel. This particular mechanism has been demonstrated to be the responsible for gating hair cells which are responsible for hearing in vertebrates.

== Bacterial MSCs ==
Bacterial MS channels were first discovered by patch-clamp experiments in E. coli. They have been classified based on their conductance as mini (MscM), small (MscS) and large large (MscL)). These channels function in tandem-mode and are responsible of turgor regulation in bacteria; when activated by changes in the osmotic pressure. MscM is activated first at really low pressures followed by MscS, and finally MscL being the last chance of survival during osmotic shock. Their task was demonstrated when bacteria missing both MscS and MscL were lysed after exposure to osmotic downshocks.

MscS: Small conductance mechanosensitive channel.

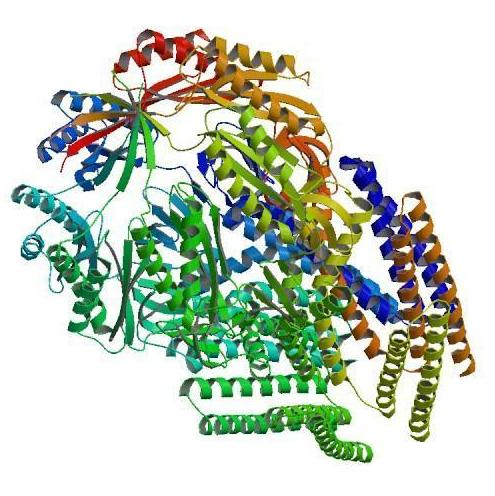
The closed structure of MscS

The main conductance is 1nS in buffer solution. Channel-proteins have been found in gram-positive and gram-negative bacteria, archaea and plants. MscS channel was found after studies in E. coli spheroplasts. The identification of the gene family necessitated for MS of small conductance was as two different channels. YggB encoding MscS and KefA encoding MscK in E. coli further confirm its role osmotic regulation. Mutagenesis studies showed that when both genes YggB and KefA were deleted MscS lost its function, but maintain MscL and MscM, but mutants deficient of YggB and MscL showed that the function of those channel is to open in respond to pressure range right before cell rupture.

The 3D structure of this channel at closed state was elucidated after the crystallography study by Bass et al. which showed that at resolution of 3.9 Å this 31kDa protein is an homoheptamer forming a channel with 80 Å of diameter and 120 Å in length, each subunit contains three transmembrane domains (TM1, TM2, and TM3) with the N-terminal facing the periplasm and the C-terminal embedded in the cytoplasm. The TM3 is highly conserved in MscS family and it is thought to play an important role in MS prokaryotic gating. MscS is a small protein composed of 286 amino acid residues activated by both tension in the lipid bilayer and voltage; in 2002 Vasquez et al. detailed this process and showed that during the change from closed state to open state the TM1 tilt and rotate making TM2 being exposed to the membrane and the TM3 helices expand, tilt, and rotate. During the rearrangement the confined part of the pore was measured as 11 Å, and water molecules were more accessible to the TM3. The two transmembrane domains are in continuous contact with the lipid bilayer and are thought to be the sensor for the tension in the lipid bilayer as well as sensor for voltage because of the three arginine residues present in those domains.

Although MscS is activated by voltage it has been demonstrated that, voltage itself is insufficient to open the channel, thus functioning in a cooperative manner with the channel. The more positive voltage, the higher the probabilities of opening the channel as long as pressure over the threshold is still applied in the system; the performance of this channel at higher voltage has not been completely understood. MscS has a small affinity for negative ions including Cl-, and glutamate.

MscL: Large conductance mechanosensitive channel.

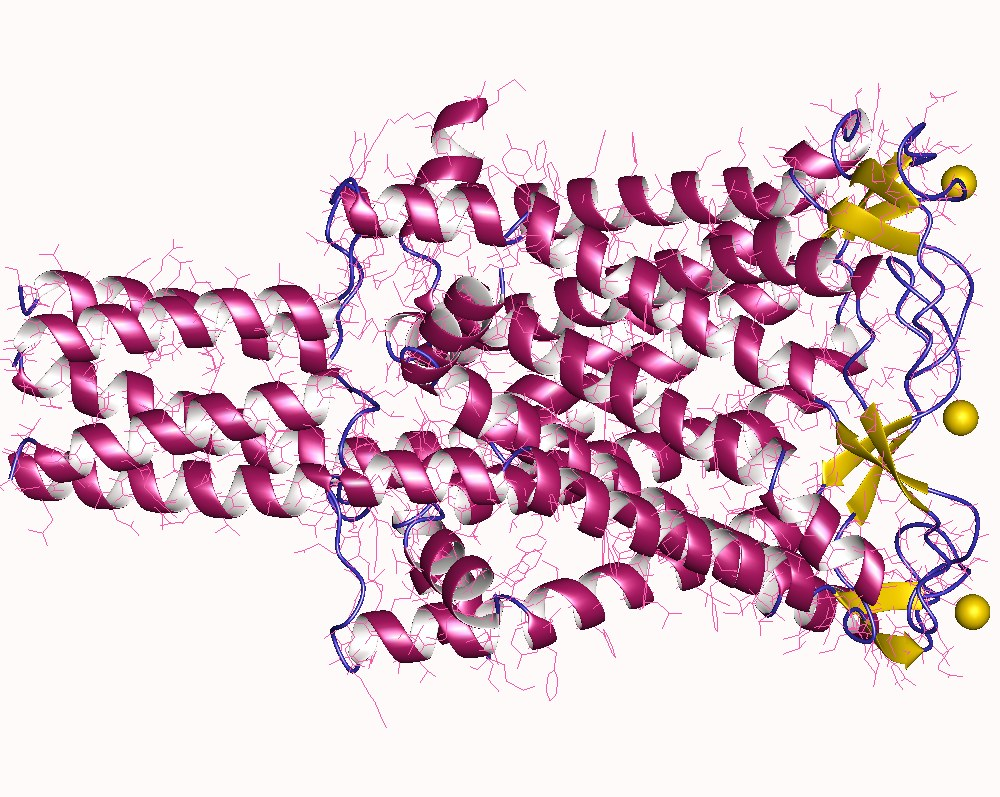
The closed structure of MscL

In bacteria MscL was the first MS channels cloned and sequenced, and is by far one of the most studied channels. The gene encoding MscL protein is trkA and it is located in the inner membrane of the E. coli. The protein is 17 KDa, and consists of 136 amino acids; mostly hydrophobic residues resulting in two hydrophobic segments, however molecular weight of the functional channel is presumed to be 60-70 KDa from gel filtration experiments, suggesting oligomerization. As a common feature no cysteines residues are present in this channel.

In 1998 the homolog MscL from mycobacterium tuberculosis Tb-MscL was elucidated at closed state by X ray crystallography at 3.5 Å resolution. The protein is a homopentamer composed mostly of helical regions trans orientation of the helices with respect to the bilayer, with two domains: the cytoplasmic and the transmembrane. The channel is 85 Å in length, 35 Å and 50 Å for the cytoplasmic transmembrane domain respectively and 50 Å in diameter. The helices cross the membrane twice with both the C-terminal and the N-terminal, thus having two transmembrane domains TM1 and TM2 being TM1 the most conserved region among MscL proteins especially at the N-terminal region. It is located in the cytoplasm and forms a α-hydrophobic helix called S1; the region between the transmembrane domains form a loop that is divided into two regions: S2 a glycine-proline rich region and S3 a short helical section. The secondary structure of the protein is resistant to thermal denaturation still in the presence of SDS.

During the activation of the prokaryotic MscL by tension in the lipid bilayer an intermediate state was determined. The S1 segments form a bundle when the structure is in the closed state, and the crosslinking of S1 segments prevents the opening of the channel. When tension is applied to the membrane the transmembrane barrel-like structure expand and stretch apart the region S1-TM1 allowing the channel to open. The size of the pore at open state is approximately 25Å. The transition from closed to intermediate state is accompanied by small movements of the TM1; further transitions to the open stated are characterized by big rearrangements in both the TM1 and TM2.

=== Role of lipid bilayer in MS ===
The lipid bilayer is an important structure in all living cells; it has many functions such as separation of compartments, and signaling among others. In the case of the prokaryotic protein channels MscS and MscL both are gated by tension in the lipid bilayer, thus suggesting an important role in such a complex structures.

The tension in the membrane bilayer has been extensively studied, simple intrinsic properties of the lipids can account for the contributions in the free energy of the open, intermediate, and close state of the MS channels. The bilayer possess different features that allows it to transduce tension and to prevent exhaustive deformations, the first one is "in plane fluidity of the lipid bilayer" meaning that any in plane tension in the lipid bilayer is felt homogenously in the absence of cytoskeleton interactions. The lipid molecules have specific spaces in between them which prevent changes in the lipid bilayer.

The contribution of membrane deformation in the gating of MS channels can be divided in two types: the deformation of the plane of the bilayer, and the deformation of the thickness of the bilayer. Also during any process involving changes in the structure, the free energy of the process itself is also an important factor. During gating the major processes that account for this event are: hydrophobic mismatch, and membrane curvature. It has been calculated that the free energy of the tension in the lipid bilayer is similar to the energy needed for gating the channels.

A different study showed that the length of the hydrophobic tail affects its functioning as well as supporting the different states, phosphatidylcholine (PC) 18 stabilizes better the open state of the MscL channel, PC 14 stabilizes the intermediate state, and a mixture of PC 18 and lysophosphatidylcholine (LPC) stabilizes the closed state, suggesting that the bilayer thickness (for carbon tail lengths of 16, 18 and 20) affects channel function. In conclusion the energy from the environment of the membrane plays an important role in the total energy of channel gating.

== Eukaryotes ==
In eukaryotes, two of the best known mechanosensitive ion channels are the potassium channels TREK-1 and TRAAK, both of which are found in mammalian neurons.

Recently, a new mechanosensitive ion channel family was cloned, with two mammalian members, PIEZO1 and PIEZO2. Both these channels are expressed in the lungs and bladder, organs with important mechanosensory functions. Piezo1 is also expressed in the skin, and in red blood cells, and its gain of function mutations cause hereditary xerocytosis. Piezo2 is expressed in sensory neurons of the dorsal root and trigeminal ganglia indicating that it may play a role in touch sensation. Mutations in piezo2 are associated with a human disease named Distal Arthrogryposis.

== Physiological role of MS ==
MS channels are ubiquitously expressed in the membrane of prokaryotes suggesting their significance. In Bacteria and Archaea the function of these channels is conserved and it has been demonstrated that they play a role in turgor regulation. In Eukarya MS channels are involved in all five senses. The main family is TRP, and one good example is hair cells involved in the hearing process. When a wave of sound deflects the stereocilia, the channel opens. This is an instance of the Spring-like Tether gating mechanism. Recent studies have revealed a new role of mechanosensitive pathways in which naive mesenchymal stem cells are committed to a particular lineage based on the elasticity of its surrounding matrix.

Some MS channels that have been cloned and characterized. Data adapted from Martinac, 2001
Channel	Source	Gating mechanism	Physiological role
MscL	Bacteria	Lipid bilayer	Turgor regulation and cell growth
MscS	Bacteria	Lipid bilayer	Turgor regulation and cell growth
MscMJ	Archaea	Lipid bilayer	Turgor regulation
MEC4	C. elegans	Tether	Touch
TRPY	Fungi	Bilayer	Turgor regulation
TRECK-1	Mammalian	Bilayer	Resting membrane potential

MS have also been suggested as a potential target for antibiotics, the reasoning behind this idea is that both McsS and MscL are highly conserved among prokaryotes, but their homologs have not been found in animals making them an exceptional potential for further studies.

In mammalian neurons, opening of the ion channels depolarizes the afferent neuron producing an action potential with sufficient depolarization. Channels open in response to two different mechanisms: the prokaryotic model and the mammalian hair cell model. Stretch-activated ion channels have been shown to detect vibration, pressure, stretch, touch, sounds, tastes, smell, heat, volume, and vision. Stretch-activated ion channels have been categorized into three distinct "superfamilies": the ENaC/DEG family, the TRP family, and the K1 selective family. These channels are involved with bodily functions such as blood pressure regulation. They are shown to be associated with many cardiovascular diseases. Stretch-activated channels were first observed in chick skeletal muscles by Falguni Guharay and Frederick Sachs in 1983 and the results were published in 1984. Since then stretch-activated channels have been found in cells from bacteria to humans as well as plants.

The opening of these channels is central to a neuron's response to pressure, often osmotic pressure and blood pressure, to regulate ionic flow in internal environments.

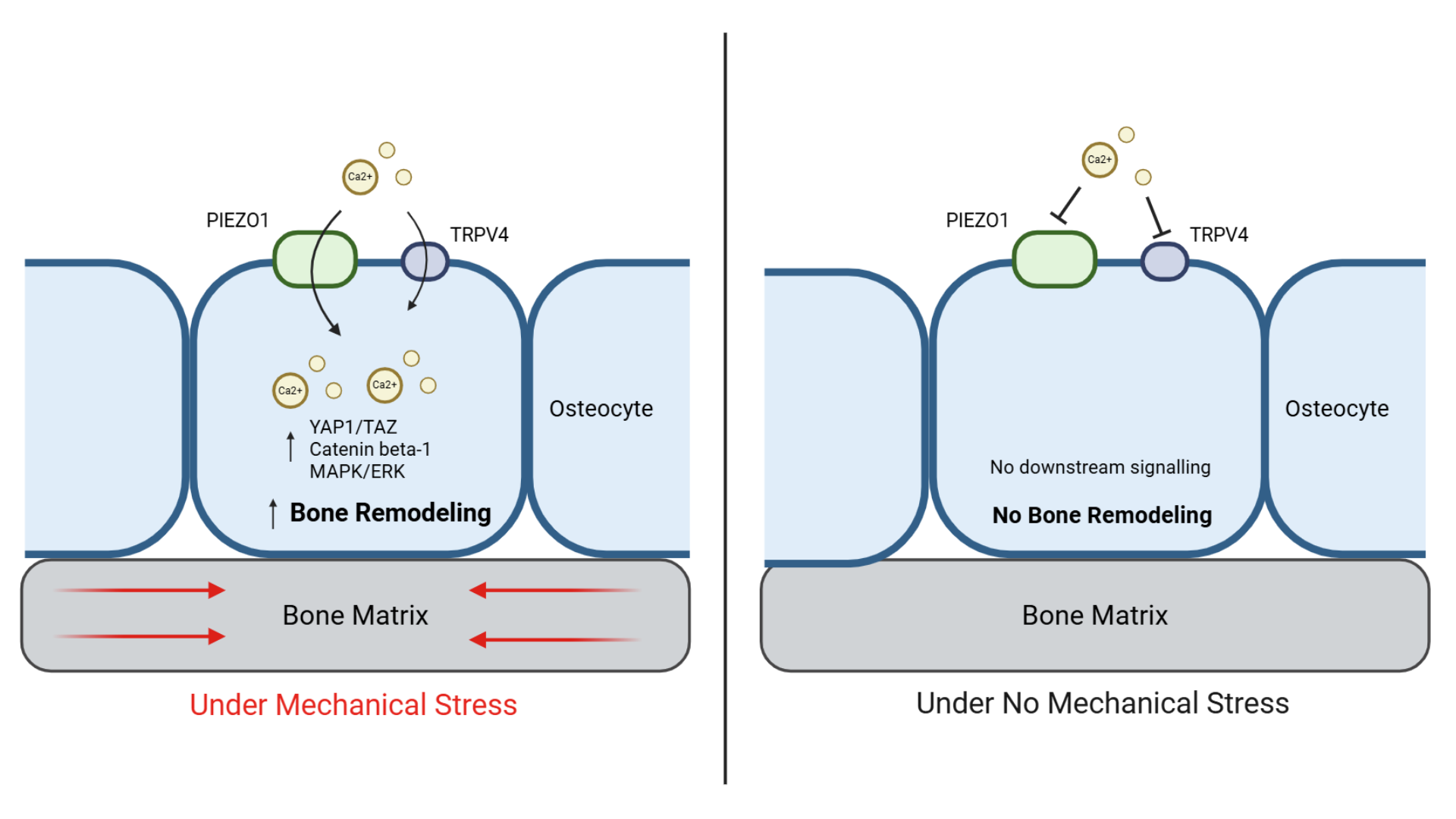
Under mechanical stress, PIEZO1 and TRPV4 allow an influx of calcium, producing increased osteocyte activity and bone remodeling.

Further physiological functions of mechanosensitive channels have been identified in regulation of bone density and remodeling. In instances of mechanical stress, often present in exercise, certain channels open to trigger downstream signaling pathways. PIEZO1, a channel present on osteocytes, has been shown to open in response to mechanical load. This opening creates an influx of calcium, activating downstream signaling pathways including YAP1/TAZ, β-catenin, and MAPK/ERK to promote bone formation. PIEZO1 can also trigger TRPV4 and other mechanosensitive channels to fine tune the response to mechanical stress. In animal studies, loss of PIEZO1 leads to decreased bone density, suggesting an essential role of mechanosensitive channels in osteohomeostasis. As you might expect, the converse is also true. As these channels experience mechanical unloading, PIEZO1 and other mechanosensitive channels are deactivated, leading to bone loss. These findings explain why we experience a rapid decrease in bone mass during periods of immobilization, bed rest, or spaceflight.

== Techniques used to study MS ==
This is a short list of the most frequently techniques used to study the properties, function, mechanism and other features of these channels:

- Patch-clamp: Single cell recording.
- EPR
- Molecular dynamics simulation: determination of the atomic fluctuation of the system.
- Atomic force Microscopy: mechanical forces of the membrane.
- Micropipette Aspiration: Pressure to cells.
- 3D simulations

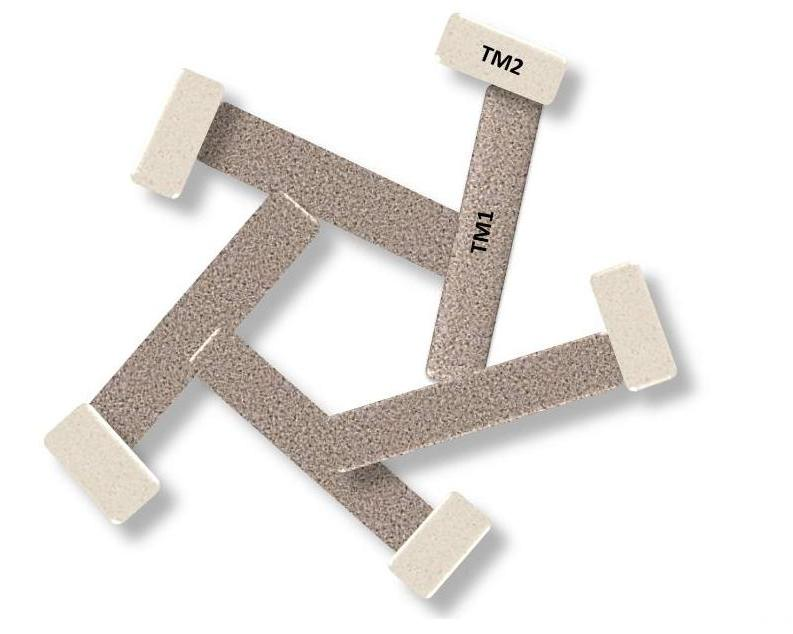
Finite Element Model of MscL, a bacterial channel. This figure is similar to that in Tang et al.

- Mutagenesis

Through experiments performed on the cytoskeleton and extra-cytoplasmic matrix of stretch-activated ion channels, these structures have been shown to play significant roles in mechanotransduction. In one such experiment on adult heart cells, whole cell recordings were taken on cells being squeezed with two pipettes at 1 Hz/1 um. This squeezing produced no current until five minutes in when a large depolarization was observed. Hereafter, the cell became extremely responsive to every compression and gradually decreased sensitivity over the next few minutes. Researchers hypothesized that, initially, the cytoskeleton was buffering the mechanical deformation of the squeezing from the channel. The depolarization at five minutes was the cytoskeleton snapping which subsequently caused the channel to sense the mechanical deformations and thereby respond to the stimuli. Researchers believe that over the few minutes where the channel repaired itself the cytoskeleton must be repairing itself and newly adapting to the squeezing stimuli.

== Structure ==
=== ENaC/DEG superfamily ===
==== ASIC ====
There are six known ASIC subunits, ASIC1a, ASIC1b, ASIC2a, ASIC2b, ASIC3, and ASIC4, which have two transmembrane domains, extracellular and intracellular loops, and C and N termini. These ASIC subunits likely form tetramers with varying kinetics, pH sensitivity, tissue distribution, and pharmacological properties.

=== TRP superfamily ===
There are seven subfamilies within the TRP superfamily: TRPC (canonical), TRPV (vanilloid), TRPM (melastatin), TRPP (polycystin), TRPML (mucolipin), TRPA (ankyrin), and TRPN (NOMPC-like). TRP proteins typically consist of six transmembrane domains, S1, S2, S3, S4, S5, and S6, with a pore between S5 and S6. These contain intracellular N and C termini, which form tetramers and vary in length and domain. Within the channel there are ankyrins, which are structural proteins that mediate protein-protein interactions, and are thought to contribute to the tether model of stretch-activated channel opening. NOMPC, identified in D. melanogaster mechanotransduction and a member of the TRPN subfamily, contains a relatively high number of ankyrins.

=== K1-selective superfamily ===
K2P channels consist of six subfamilies and contain four transmembrane domains, which form two pores each between domains 1–2 and 3–4. K2P channels also contain a short N terminal domain and a C terminal which varies in length. There is also a large extracellular linker region between domain 1 and the first pore formed between domains 1–2.

== Examples ==
TRP channels are typically non-selective, although a few are selective for calcium or hydrated magnesium ions, and are composed of integral membrane proteins. Although many TRP channels are activated by voltage change, ligand binding, or temperature change, some TRP channels have been hypothesized to be involved in mechanotransduction. Some examples are TRPV4, which mediates mechanical load in a variety of tissues, including the liver, heart, lung, trachea, testis, spleen, salivary glands, cochlea, and vascular endothelial cells, as well as TRPC1 and TRPC6, which are involved in muscle mechanosensation. TRPC1 is expressed in the myocytes of the heart, arteries, and skeletal muscle. TRPC1 is widely considered to be a non-selective "store-operated ion channel" (SOC) involved in the calcium influx following calcium depletion of the endoplasmic reticulum of the cell. TRPC6 is a calcium-permeable non-selective cation channel expressed in the cardiovascular system. TRPC6 is potentially a sensor of mechanically and osmotically induced membrane stretch, and is possibly directly gated by membrane tension. Other examples include TREK-1 and TRAAK which are found in mammalian neurons and are classified as potassium channels in the tandem pore domain class and "MID-1" (also known as "MCLC" or CLCC1.)

The six K2P channel subfamilies are regulated by various physical, cellular, and pharmacological stimulants, including membrane stretch, heat, pH change, calcium flux, and protein kinases.

== Clinical relevance ==
Stretch-activated ion channels perform important functions in many different areas of our body. Pressure-dependent myogenic constriction resistance arteries require these channels for regulation in the smooth muscle of the arteries. They have been found to be used for volume sensing in animals and blood pressure regulation. Bacteria have been shown to relieve hydrostatic pressure through MscL and MscS channels.

=== Pathologies associated with stretch-activated ion channels ===
Stretch-activated ion channels have been correlated with major pathologies. Some of these pathologies include cardiac arrhythmia (such as atrial fibrillation), cardiac hypertrophy, Duchenne muscular dystrophy, and other cardiovascular diseases.

=== Blocking stretch-activated ion channels ===
Gadolinium (Gd^{3+}) and other lanthanides have been shown to block stretch-activated ion channel function. The peptide toxin isolated from the Chilean rose tarantula (Grammostola rosea, synonym G. spatulata), mechanotoxin 4 (GsMTx4) has been shown to inhibit these channels from the extracellular side, but it does not inhibit all stretch-activated ion channels and particularly has no effect on 2p channels.

=== Role in cardiovascular development ===
In the developing vertebrate heart, endocardial and endothelial cells are exposed to mechanical forces from both blood flow and myocardial contraction. Studies in zebrafish have shown that the mechanosensitive channels Trpv4, Trpp2 (Pkd2), Piezo1 and Piezo2a are required for normal heart valve development. They act upstream of the flow responsive transcription factor Klf2a and of Notch signalling. Mechanical forces also induce expression of the transcription factor egr3, which is required cell-autonomously in endothelial cells for valve leaflet formation in zebrafish and is up regulated by force in porcine valvular endothelial cells. In cultured endothelial cells, shear-stress activation of PIEZO1 promotes Notch1 cleavage through the protease ADAM10. PIEZO1 is also required for embryonic vascular remodelling in mice, and loss of function mutations in human PIEZO1 cause generalized lymphatic dysplasia. Because abnormal cardiac mechanics during development are thought to contribute to congenital heart defects, mechanosensitive channels are studied as potential links between tissue forces and cell fate decisions.

=== List of diseases associated with mechanosensitive channels ===
- Polycystic kidney disease.
- Atrial fibrillation

Abnormalities in the function of MS channels can cause:

- Neuronal disease
- Muscular degeneration.
- Cardiac arrhythmias
- Hypertension.

== See also ==
- Mechanosensation
- Voltage-gated ion channels
- Ligand-gated ion channels
- Lipid-gated ion channels
