= Actinotalea =

Scientific classification
- Domain: Bacteria
- Kingdom: Bacillati
- Phylum: Actinomycetota
- Class: Actinomycetes
- Order: Micrococcales
- Family: Cellulomonadaceae
- Genus: Actinotalea; Yi et al. 2007

Type species
- Actinotalea fermentans (Bagnara et al. 1985) Yi et al. 2007

Species
- A. caeni Jin et al. 2017; "A. carbonis" (Shi et al. 2012) Semenova et al. 2022; A. fermentans (Bagnara et al. 1985) Yi et al. 2007; A. ferrariae Li et al. 2013; A. solisilvae Yan et al. 2018; "A. subterranea" Semenova et al. 2022

Genus of bacteria

Actinotalea is a genus in the phylum Actinomycetota (bacteria).

== Etymology ==
The name Actinotalea derives from:

Greek noun aktis, aktinos (ἀκτίς, ἀκτῖνος), a beam =actinomycete-like bacterium; Latin feminine gender noun talea, a slender staff, rod, stick; Neo-Latin feminine gender noun Actinotalea, ray stick, in effect meaning a slender bacillus-shaped actinomycete-like bacterium.

The specific epithet fermentans is from the Latin participle adjective fermentans, fermenting.
