= Membrane curvature =

Characterization of selective barriers

Membrane curvature is the geometrical measure or characterization of the curvature of membranes. The membranes can be naturally occurring or man-made (synthetic). An example of naturally occurring membrane is the lipid bilayer of cells, also known as cellular membranes. Synthetic membranes can be obtained by preparing aqueous solutions of certain lipids. The lipids will then "aggregate" and form various phases and structures. According to the conditions (concentration, temperature, ionic strength of solution, etc.) and the chemical structures of the lipid, different phases will be observed. For instance, the lipid POPC (palmitoyl oleyl phosphatidyl choline) tends to form lamellar vesicles in solution, whereas smaller lipids (lipids with shorter acyl chains, up to 8 carbons in length), such as detergents, will form micelles if the CMC (critical micelle concentration) was reached. There are five commonly proposed mechanisms by which membrane curvature is created, maintained, or controlled: lipid composition, shaped transmembrane proteins, protein motif insertion/BAR domains, protein scaffolding, and cytoskeleton scaffolding.

== Geometry ==
A biological membrane is commonly described as a two-dimensional surface, which spans a three-dimensional space. So, to describe membrane shape, it is not sufficient to determine the membrane curling that is seen in a single cross-section of the object, because in general there are two curvatures that characterize the shape each point in space. Mathematically, these two curvatures are called the principal curvatures, $c_1$ and $c_2$, and their meaning can be understood by the following thought experiment. If you cross-section the membrane surface at a point under consideration using two planes that are perpendicular to the surface and oriented in two special directions called the principal directions, the principal curvatures are the curvatures of the two lines of intercepts between the planes and the surface which have almost circular shapes in close proximity to the point under consideration. The radii of these two circular fragments, $R_1$ and $R_2$, are called the principal radii of curvature, and their inverse values are referred to as the two principal curvatures.

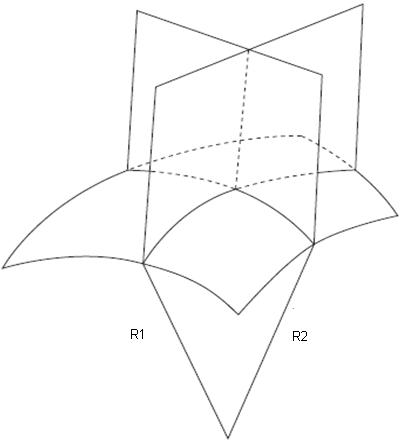
Curvature radii

$c_1 = 1/R_1$

$c_2 = 1/R_2$

The principal curvatures $c_1$ and $c_2$ can vary arbitrarily and thereby give origin to different geometrical shapes, such as cylinder, plane, sphere and saddle. Analysis of the principal curvature is important, since a number of biological membranes possess shapes that are analogous to these common geometry staples. For instance, prokaryotic cells such as cocci, rods, and spirochette display the shape of a sphere, and the latter two the shape of a cylinder. Erythrocytes, commonly referred to as red blood cells, have the shape of a saddle, although these cells are capable of some shape deformation. The table below lists common geometric shapes and a qualitative analysis of their two principal curvatures.

Shape	$c_1$	$c_2$	Mean curvature H	Gaussian Curvature K
Plane	0	0	0	0
Cylinder	+	0	+	0
Sphere	+	+	+	+
Saddle	+	-	± or 0	-

The principal curvatures can then be combined in two different ways to further characterize the local geometry of a membrane surface as seen in the table above. These two types of curvature are Mean curvature and Gaussian curvature. These values are highly critical in the field of Membrane Curvature because of the role they play in the Helfrich model, which will be discussed below. While mean curvature describes the average signed bending of a membrane, the Gaussian curvature distinguishes whether the surface bends in the same or opposite directions along its principal axes.

The Mean curvature is described as the average signed bending of the membrane. This is defined as

$H=(C_1+C_2)/2$

One way that this is helpful is that it combines bending along both principal directions into a single quantity.

The Gaussian curvature is defined as

$K=C_1*C_2$

By multiplying the two principal curvatures together, we are able to indicate the sign, which helps us understand the local geometry. K > 0 means that the principal curvatures have the same sign, as in a sphere-shaped surface; K < 0 means that the principal curvatures have opposite signs, as in a saddle-shaped surface; K = 0 means that one of the principal curvatures is zero, as in a cylinder or plane.

Even though often membrane curvature is thought to be a completely spontaneous process, thermodynamically speaking there must be factors actuating as the driving force for curvature to exist. Currently, there are some postulated mechanisms for accepted theories on curvature; nonetheless, undoubtedly two of the major driving forces are lipid composition and proteins embedded and/or bound to membranes.

== Membrane Bending Energy ==
Since cells experience a wide variety of mechanical stresses, researchers have developed continuum mechanical models to describe lipid membranes. Wolfgang Helfrich proposed a model in which the lipid membrane is treated as a two-dimensional surface embedded in three-dimensional space. This approximation is appropriate because the characteristic length scales of membrane deformation are much larger than the membrane thickness. The mechanical properties of the membrane can be described using different moduli: the mean-curvature bending modulus κ and the Gaussian-curvature modulus κ̅. Membrane surface tension σ also contributes to the energetic cost associated with membrane area.

P. Canham, W. Helfrich, and E. Evans made significant contributions to the development of continuum models of membrane mechanics. The Canham–Helfrich model describes the free energy associated with membrane curvature and surface tension through the Helfrich Hamiltonian, expressed as:

$E=\int [\kappa/2(2H-C_0)^2+\kappa_g\Kappa+\sigma] dA$

Helfrich budding scene

Mean-curvature bending energy

This represents the mean-curvature bending-energy density, where (κ) is the bending rigidity, which describes how strongly the membrane resists bending. H is the mean curvature, which can vary as the membrane deforms. (C_0) represents the spontaneous curvature of the membrane in the absence of externally imposed bending stresses. When (2H=C_0), the local mean-curvature bending-energy density is minimized, without considering other energetic contributions.

Gaussian-curvature energy

This term represents the Gaussian-curvature energy density. The Gaussian bending modulus, is a measure of how much the gaussian curvature, K, contributes to the elastic energy. Under certain conditions the integrated Gaussian-curvature contribution remains constant, as described by the Gauss–Bonnet theorem. Gaussian-curvature energy becomes particularly important when membrane topology changes, such as during the formation of separate membrane compartments.

Surface-tension energy

Here, σ represents membrane surface tension. This part of the integral represent the energetic cost of the surface tension of the membrane. The surface tension is dependent on the composition of the membrane, such as lipids and protein composition.

Application of the Helfrich hamiltonian, allows for predictions of different membrane events describing mathematical changes to the membrane curvature such as vesicle budding, or other membrane stretching events.

== Induced by lipids ==
=== Dynamics ===
Perhaps the most simple and intuitive driving force in membrane curvature is the natural spontaneous curvature exhibited by some lipids. This is because, depending on their chemical structures, lipids tend to curve with a slight spontaneously negative or positive curvature. Lipids such as DOPC (dioleoyl phosphatidyl choline), diacyl glycerol, dioleoyl phosphatidyl ethanolamine (DOPE) and cholesterol exhibit a negative spontaneous curvature. On the other hand, lipids with smaller acyl chain area to polar head group area ratio tend to curve positively; in other words, they exhibit positive spontaneous curvature. The table below lists experimentally determined spontaneous curvatures for different lipids in DOPE.

Lipid	J_{s} (nm^{−1})
Lysophospholipids	
L-lyso PC	1/5.8
O-lyso PC	1/3.8
P-lyso PC	1/6.8
L-lyso PE	<1/40
O-lyso PE	<1/40
S-lyso PE	<1/40
Other Lipids
DOPS	1/14.4
DOPC	-1/20
PA	-1/4.6
DOPE	-1/3
Cholesterol	-1/2.9
DCG	-1/1.3

The energy requirements to generate a cylinder shaped cell from an originally flat membrane can be expressed as

${F_{Cyl}} = \pi LK_b(\frac{1}{R} - 2J_B)$

where L is the length of the cylinder, J_{B} is the difference between the spontaneous curvature, J_{s}, for the lipids in the inner and outer leaflet divided by two, and K_{b} is the bending modulus of the bilayer.

The radii of membrane cylinders that form in intracellular membrane transport pathways are typically about 25–30 nm. So, the spontaneous curvature necessary to generate such cylinders equals about (1/50) nm–1. As J_{B} results from a difference in the spontaneous curvatures of the monolayers, an unusual membrane lipid composition would be required to produce such curvature. The lipids cholesterol, DOPE and diacylglycerol are characterized by strongly negative spontaneous curvatures (figure 1) and therefore have the potential to generate a large membrane curvature. However, even for these lipids, the required J_{B} can be reached only if they are extensively concentrated in the internal monolayer.

=== Clustering ===
Different changes to lipid structure, such as tail saturation, affect the overall shape of the lipid. A change in shape such as the one shown, when disproportionately in higher concentration on one side of the membrane, allows the membrane to curve.

Multiple factors influence whether a lipid will exhibit positive or negative curvature. For example, the presence of double bonds in the tail of a lipid will increase the occupied space of the tail, and thus increase the lipid's propensity to induce negative curvature. In the figure, the different shape of lipids with a double bond–also known as unsaturated–can be visualized. However, a single conically shaped lipid will not induce curvature across an entire region of the membrane. Instead, clustering of similarly shaped lipids in one leaflet compared to the other is required to induce curvature. This difference in lipid composition between leaflets is actively formed and controlled within cells by proteins such as flippases, or removed to discourage curvature by proteins such as scramblases. When asymmetric lipid compositions are present and the membrane is unable to curve due to other surrounding factors, the membrane is destabilized - further supporting the crucial role that lipid composition plays in membrane curvature. When the membrane does curve, a higher number of lipids will be required to be present on the positive curvature side of the membrane to cover the increased surface area that is present compared to the negatively curved side.

Conversely, cardiolipin, a cone-shaped lipid, shows affinity for curved membrane regions, which is compatible with cardiolipin self-associative clustering.

== Induced by proteins ==
Some biologically occurring lipids do exhibit spontaneous curvature which could explain the shapes of biological membranes. Nevertheless, calculations show that spontaneous lipid curvature alone is either insufficient or would require conditions that are unrealistic to drive the degree of curvature observed in most cells. It is now known that lipid curvature is "aided" by protein structures in order to generate complete cellular curvature.

=== Clustering ===
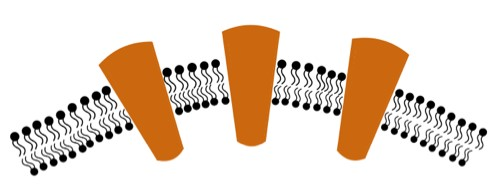
Transmembrane proteins with inherent curvature inducing curvature in a membrane.

Transmembrane proteins with an inherently conical shape will be more stable in, and induce curvature in membranes. Depending on the shape of the protein, this can induce either positive or negative curvature. An example is the voltage-gated potassium channel having a larger diameter on the outer leaflet than the inner leaflet of the membrane. As seen in the figure, the larger amount of space taken up in the one leaflet causes the membrane to curve away from that side.

Not only does the protein effect membrane curvature, but membrane curvature can affect membrane proteins as well. Conically shaped proteins will be less stable in membranes that are constrained to be planar, and cylindrically shaped proteins will be less stable in membranes that are constrained to have high curvature. Thus, as highly curved vesicles are formed from relatively planar membranes, proteins can be either included or excluded from the forming vesicles based on their shape.

=== Motif insertion ===
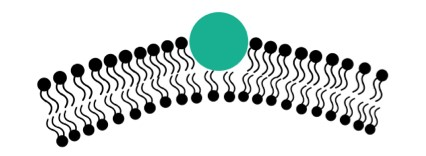
Insertion of a piece of a protein into one leaflet of the membrane induces curvature.

The hydrophobic portion of protein can act as "wedge" when inserting into lipid bilayer. Epsin is one example that utilizes this mechanism to drive membrane bending. Epsin has several amphipathic alpha helices that allows it to partition between the hydrophobic core of the membrane and surrounding aqueous, hydrophilic environment. Another interesting characteristic of epsin and other proteins that bind to membranes is the fact that it shows high binding affinity for a fairly common membrane lipid, phosphatidylinositol 4,5-bisphosphate (PI-4,5-P2). Unlike other proteins that simply bend the membrane through sheer rigidity, epsin is a globular soluble protein and thus not rigid. The insertion of its helices into the membrane force the neighboring lipids of the leaflet that has been bound to expand laterally. This displacement of lipids on only one of the leaflets increases the bilayer's curvature. This figure shows membrane bending by insertion of a hydrophobic protein motif into a lipid bilayer. The figure illustrates a slightly different mechanism. In this case, the membrane-bending protein does not exhibit intrinsic rigidity. Instead they are often globular and soluble. The protein epsin is an example. Epsin has an ENTH (epsin N-terminal homology) domain which inserts its amphipathic alpha helix into the membrane. Epsin has high binding affinity for the membrane if PI-4,5-P2 is present.

=== BAR domains ===
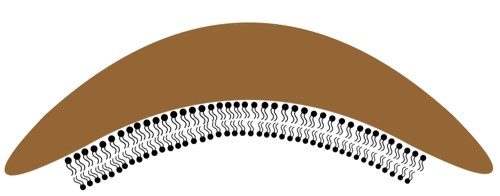
A BAR domain of a protein inducing and stabilizing the curvature of a membrane.

Another example of protein interactions that directly affect membrane curvature is that of the BAR (Bin, amphiphysin, Rvs’) domain. The BAR domain is present in a large family of proteins. Relative to the cellular lipid bilayer, this domain is rigid and exhibits a "banana" shape. It has been postulated that the positively charged amino acid residues in the concave region of the BAR domain would come into contact with the negatively charged polar head groups of lipids in the bilayer, thus allows the binding process. Upon binding, the membrane's curvature is increased by the rigid domain. This figure shows the bending of a membrane by a banana-shape like BAR domain.

In the figure, an illustration of a BAR domain present in a number of proteins. The membrane curvature is induced by the very shape of this proteic region. This domain attaches to the lipid bilayer through strong coulombic interactions. This idea is supported by the existence of positively charged amino acid residues in the concave region of the BAR domain. These amino acids would come into contact with the negatively charged polar head groups of lipids in the bilayer. This form phenomenon is also referred to as the "scaffold mechanism".

=== Scaffolding ===
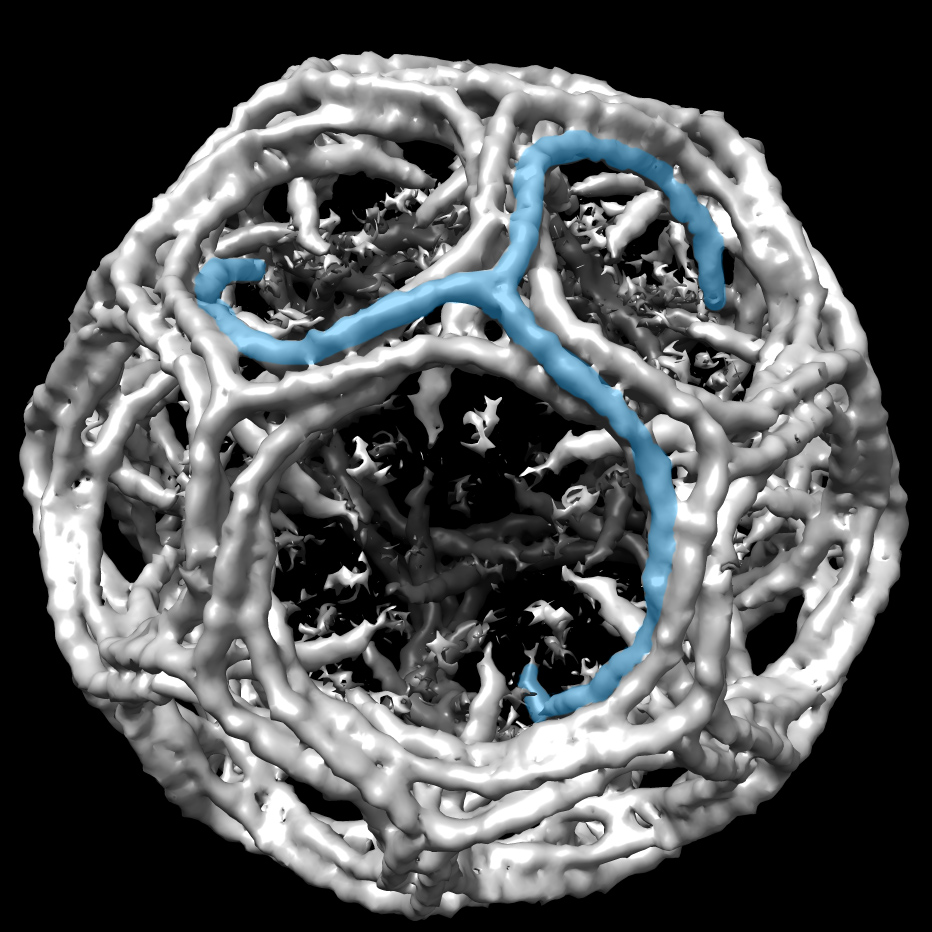
Cage-like structure of clathrin. When this structure forms around a membrane, it pulls the membrane into a tight curvature until eventual vesicle budding.

A classical example of membrane bending by rigid protein scaffold is clathrin. Clathrin is involved in cellular endocytosis and is sequestrated by specific signaling molecules. Clathrin can attach to adaptor protein complexes on the cellular membrane, and it polymerizes into lattices to drive greater curvature, resulting in endocytosis of a vesicular unit. Coat protein complex I (COP1) and coat protein complex II (COPII) follow similar mechanism in driving membrane curvature. This figure shows a protein coating that induces curvature. As mentioned above, proteins such as clathrin are recruited to the membrane through signaling molecules and assemble into larger polymeric structures that form a rigid structure which serves as a frame for the membrane. Clathrin binds to its receptors that are present in the membrane.

The figure shows a protein coating that induces curvature. As mentioned above, proteins such as clathrin are recruited to the membrane through signaling molecules and assemble into larger polymeric structures that form a rigid structure which serves as a frame for the membrane. Clathrin binds to its receptors that are present in the membrane.

=== Cytoskeleton ===
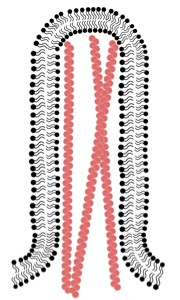
Cytoskeletal structure inducing membrane curvature. The inherent shape of a cell - as controlled by its cytoskeleton - requires that the bilayer membrane curve around it.

The overall shape of a cell is mostly determined by its cytoskeletal structure. This shape will vary widely depending on the location and function of the cell. The cell membrane must be able to curve around and fit the shape determined by these functions. This requires the membrane to be fluid enough to do so in a stable manner, and is often stabilized by the other mechanisms listed in this article, in particular lipid composition.

Mammalian cells will usually remain the roughly the same shape, with a common exception being locomotive cells. In order to move, these cells will often modify their structure via lamellipodia and filopodia. The membrane must be able to actively adapt to these changing curvature restraints in order for the cell to move effectively and without damaging the cell membrane.

=== Crowding ===
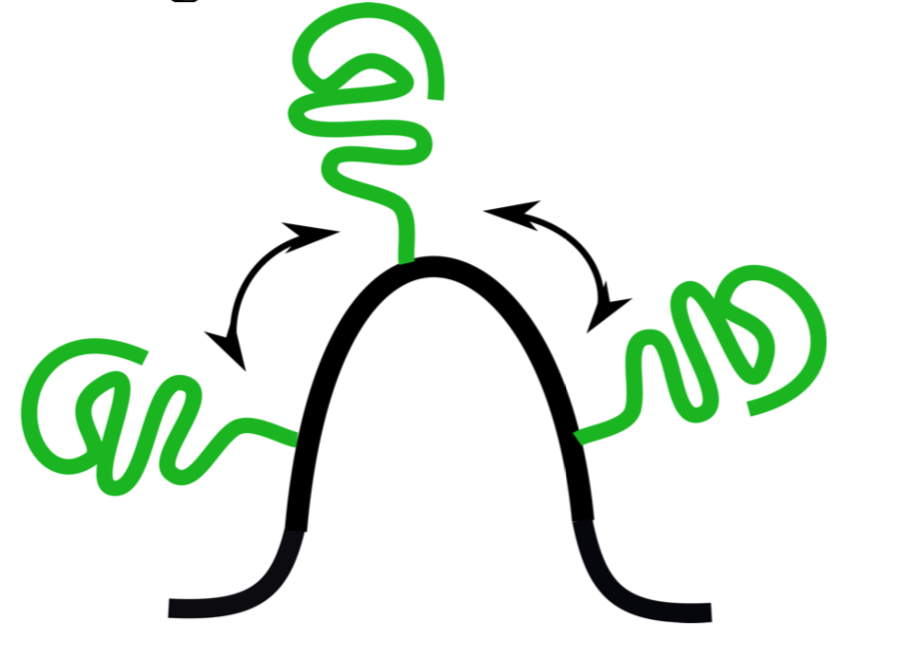
This figure illustrates membrane bending caused by protein crowding. When a high local concentration of proteins (shown in green) are present on the membrane surface (shown in black), membrane curvature can be induced. This hypothesis reasoned that the high protein concentration increases the likelihood of repulsions between proteins, therefore generates steric pressure between proteins. To relieve such pressure, lipid membrane has to bend in order to decrease protein repulsions.

The protein crowding mechanism hypothesizes that proteins can bend membrane without directly perturbing membrane structures like the above mechanisms. When a high enough local concentration of protein is present on membrane surface, repulsion between protein molecules on the membrane surface can induce membrane curvature. Although contribution of this mechanism remains unclear, multiple experimental and computation evidences have shown its potential in bending membrane. A recent study even shows that protein crowding can cause membrane bending and leads to membrane fission. These studies suggest that high local protein concentration can overcome the energy barrier to bend lipid membrane, and thus can contribute to membrane bending.
