= Judith Su =

American biophotonics researcher

Tsu-Te Judith (Judy) Su is an American researcher in biophotonics, including the use of microtoroid optical resonators in biosensors and single-molecule biochemical sensors. She is a Craig M. Berge Faculty Fellow, an associate professor of biomedical engineering, and an associate professor in the Wyant College of Optical Sciences of the University of Arizona.

== Education and career ==
Su received a bachelor's degree in mechanical engineering, with a minor in literature, and a master's degree in mechanical engineering from the Massachusetts Institute of Technology, in 2002 and 2004 respectively. She completed a Ph.D. in biochemistry and molecular biophysics from the California Institute of Technology (Caltech) in 2014. Her dissertation, Label-Free Detection of Single Biological Molecules Using Microtoroid Optical Resonators, was supervised by Douglas C. Rees; she also describes Carver Mead as a mentor and inspiration.

Until 2017, she worked as a postdoctoral researcher both at Caltech and the University of Arizona. She became a regular-rank assistant professor at the University of Arizona in 2017, and was promoted to associate professor in 2023. She was named as a Craig M. Berge Faculty Fellow in 2024.

== Recognition ==
Su was the 2019 recipient of the American Society for Laser Medicine and Surgery's Dr. Horace Furumoto Innovations Professional Young Investigator Award. The ASME named her as a Rising Star of Mechanical Engineering in 2024.

Su was elected as a senior member of the National Academy of Inventors in 2022, and named as a Fellow of SPIE, in the 2025 class of fellows. She was named as a 2026 Fellow of Optica, "for pioneering work on label-free optical biosensing for fundamental science, translational medicine, and environmental monitoring".

== Personal life ==
Su is one of four children of mechanical engineering professor Tsung-Chow (Joe) Su of Florida Atlantic University and mathematics education professor Hui Fang Huang (Angie) Su of Nova Southeastern University.
