= POPC =

Names
- Systematic IUPAC name (2R)-3-(Hexadecanoyloxy)-2-{[(9Z)-octadec-9-enoyl]oxy}propyl 2-(trimethylazaniumyl)ethyl phosphate
- Other names 1-Palmitoyl-2-oleoylphosphatidylcholine, palmitoyloleoylphosphatidylcholine

Identifiers
CAS Number	26853-31-6
3D model (JSmol)	Interactive image
ChEBI	CHEBI:73001
ChemSpider	4593686
ECHA InfoCard	100.043.673
PubChem CID	5497103
UNII	TE895536Y5
CompTox Dashboard (EPA)	DTXSID101029642
- InChI: InChI=1S/C42H82NO8P/c1-6-8-10-12-14-16-18-20-21-23-25-27-29-31-33-35-42(45)51-40(39-50-52(46,47)49-37-36-43(3,4)5)38-48-41(44)34-32-30-28-26-24-22-19-17-15-13-11-9-7-2/h20-21,40H,6-19,22-39H2,1-5H3/b21-20-/t40-/m1/s1 Key: WTJKGGKOPKCXLL-VYOBOKEXSA-N
- SMILES: CCCCCCCCCCCCCCCC(=O)OC[C@H](COP(=O)([O-])OCC[N+](C)(C)C)OC(=O)CCCCCCC/C=C\CCCCCCCC

Properties
Chemical formula	C_{42}H_{82}NO_{8}P
Molar mass	760.091 g·mol^{−1}
- Except where otherwise noted, data are given for materials in their standard state (at 25 °C [77 °F], 100 kPa). verify (what is ?) Infobox references

POPC (1-palmitoyl-2-oleoyl-sn-glycero-3-phosphocholine) is a phosphatidylcholine. It is a diacylglycerol phospholipid. It is an important phospholipid for biophysical experiments and has been used to study various subjects such as lipid rafts. POPC is also used in systems mimicking the cell membrane such as Nanodiscs. It is available commercially and is naturally present in eukaryotic cell membranes.
