= Actinotalea ferrariae =

Scientific classification
- Domain: Bacteria
- Kingdom: Bacillati
- Phylum: Actinomycetota
- Class: Actinomycetes
- Order: Micrococcales
- Family: Cellulomonadaceae
- Genus: Actinotalea
- Species: A. ferrariae

Binomial name
- Actinotalea ferrariae Li et al. 2013

Type strain
- CCTCC AB2012198; CF5-4; KCTC 29134

Species of bacterium

Actinotalea ferrariae is a Gram-positive bacterium that was isolated from iron mining power from the Hongshan Iron Mine of Daye City, Hubei Province, China.
