= KCNK2 =

Protein-coding gene in humans

Identifiers
- Aliases: KCNK2, K2p2.1, TPKC1, TREK, TREK-1, TREK1, hTREK-1c, hTREK-1e, potassium two pore domain channel subfamily K member 2
- External IDs: OMIM: 603219; MGI: 109366; GeneCards: KCNK2
Available structures
PDB	Ortholog search: PDBe RCSB
PDB	List of PDB id codes 4TWK

Gene location (Human)
Chr.	Chromosome 1 (human)
Band	1q41	Start	215,005,775 bp
Band	1q41	End	215,237,090 bp

Gene location (Mouse)
Chr.	Chromosome 1 (mouse)
Band	1|1 H6	Start	188,940,127 bp
Band	1|1 H6	End	189,134,470 bp
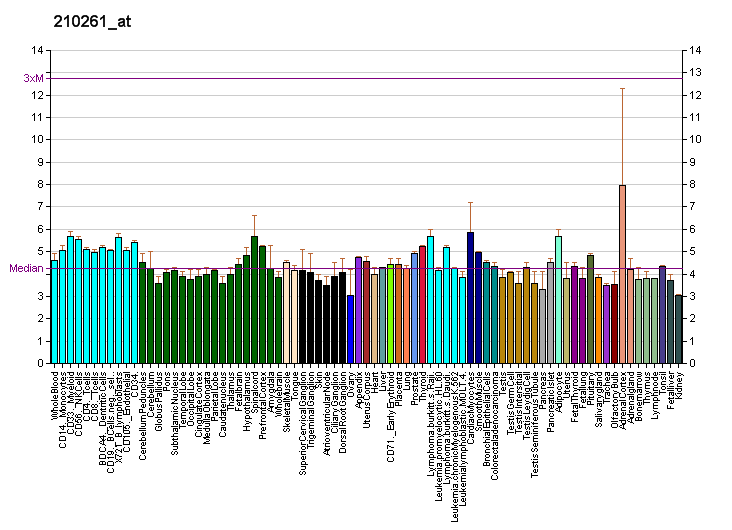
RNA expression pattern
Bgee	Human / Mouse (ortholog); Top expressed in: stromal cell of endometrium; right adrenal cortex; left adrenal gland; left adrenal cortex; Achilles tendon; ganglionic eminence; cartilage tissue; testicle; tibial nerve; prefrontal cortex / Top expressed in: median eminence; arcuate nucleus; olfactory tubercle; ventromedial nucleus; nucleus accumbens; piriform cortex; gastrula; paraventricular nucleus of hypothalamus; vestibular membrane of cochlear duct; calvaria; More reference expression data
BioGPS	More reference expression data
Gene ontology
Molecular function	potassium channel activity; voltage-gated potassium channel activity; potassium channel inhibitor activity; outward rectifier potassium channel activity; potassium ion leak channel activity
Cellular component	axon terminus; integral component of membrane; endoplasmic reticulum membrane; membrane; voltage-gated potassium channel complex; plasma membrane; astrocyte projection; calyx of Held; cell surface; axon; soma; apical plasma membrane; endoplasmic reticulum; neuron projection; nucleus; integral component of plasma membrane
Biological process	cochlea development; G protein-coupled receptor signaling pathway; positive regulation of cell death; positive regulation of cellular response to hypoxia; regulation of membrane potential; cardiac ventricle development; response to mechanical stimulus; memory; ion transport; potassium ion transport; response to axon injury; potassium ion transmembrane transport; negative regulation of cardiac muscle cell proliferation; cellular response to hypoxia; negative regulation of DNA biosynthetic process; stabilization of membrane potential
Sources:Amigo / QuickGO
Orthologs
Databases	NCBI: entry; OMA: entry
Species	Human	Mouse
Entrez	3776	16526
Ensembl	ENSG00000082482	ENSMUSG00000037624
UniProt	O95069	P97438
RefSeq (mRNA)	NM_001017424; NM_001017425; NM_014217	NM_001159850; NM_001281847; NM_001281848; NM_010607; NM_001357119
RefSeq (protein)	NP_001017424; NP_001017425; NP_055032	NP_001153322; NP_001268776; NP_001268777; NP_034737; NP_001344048 NP_001389703; NP_001389704; NP_001389705; NP_001389755; NP_001389756
Location (UCSC)	Chr 1: 215.01 – 215.24 Mb	Chr 1: 188.94 – 189.13 Mb
PubMed search
- Wikidata
View/Edit Human	View/Edit Mouse

Potassium channel subfamily K member 2, also known as TREK-1, is a protein that in humans is encoded by the KCNK2 gene.

This gene encodes K_{2P}2.1, a lipid-gated ion channel belonging to the two-pore-domain background potassium channel protein family. This type of potassium channel is formed by two homodimers that create a channel that releases potassium out of the cell to control resting membrane potential. The channel is opened by anionic lipid, certain anesthetics, membrane stretching, intracellular acidosis, and heat. Three transcript variants encoding different isoforms have been found for this gene.

== Function in neurons ==
TREK-1 is part of the subfamily of mechano-gated potassium channels that are present in mammalian neurons. They can be gated in both chemical and physical ways and can be opened via both physical stimuli and chemical stimuli. TREK-1 channels are found in a variety of tissues, but are particularly abundant in the brain and heart and are seen in various types of neurons. The C-terminal of TREK-1 channels plays a role in the mechanosensitivity of the channels.

In the neurons of the central nervous system, TREK-1 channels are important in physiological, pathophysiological, and pharmacological processes, including having a role in electrogenesis, ischemia, and anesthesia. TREK-1 has an important role in neuroprotection against epilepsy and brain and spinal cord ischemia and is being evaluated as a potential target for new developments of therapeutic agents for neurology and anesthesiology.

In the absence of a properly functioning cytoskeleton, TREK-1 channels can still open via mechanical gating. The cell membrane functions independently of the cytoskeleton and the thickness and curvature of the membrane is able to modulate the activity of the TREK-1 channels. The change in thickness is thought to be sensed by an amphipathic helix that extends from the inner leaflet of the membrane.

The insertion of certain compounds into the membrane, including inhaled anesthetics and propofol, activate TREK-1 through the enzyme phospholipase D2 (PLD2). Prior to the addition of anesthetic, PLD2 associates with GM1 lipid rafts. After the anesthetic is applied, the enzyme—or a complex of the enzyme and the channel—translocate (move) to the PIP_{2} domains where the enzyme makes phosphatidic acid that opens the channel.

== See also ==
- Tandem pore domain potassium channel
