= Dimyristoylphosphatidylethanolamine =

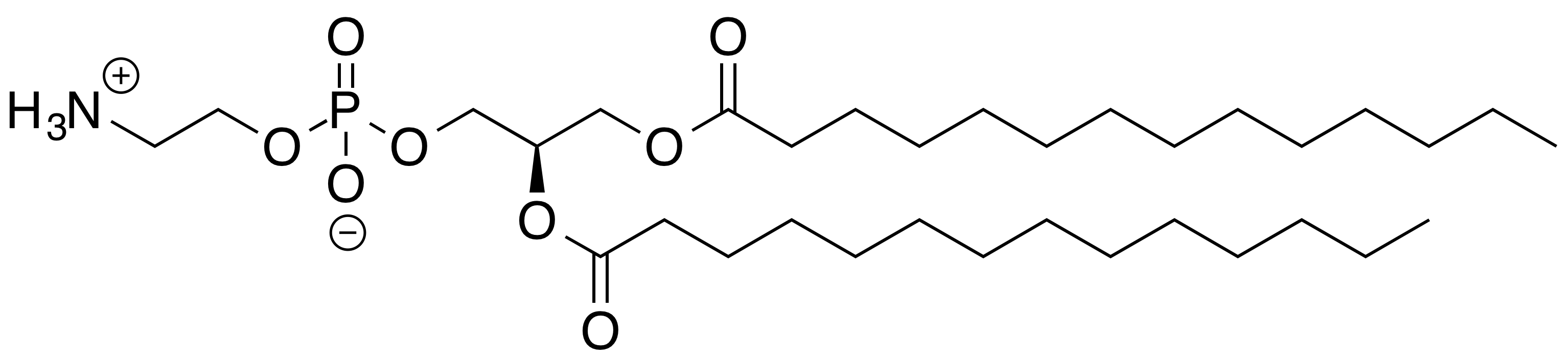

Names
- IUPAC name [(2R)-3-[2-aminoethoxy(hydroxy)phosphoryl]oxy-2-tetradecanoyloxypropyl] tetradecanoate
- Other names 1,2-dimyristoylphosphatidylethanolamine, 1,2-dimyristoyl-sn-glycero-3-phosphoethanolamine, 1,2-ditetradecanoyl-sn-glycero-3-phosphoethanolamine, DMPE, 14:0 PE, dimyristoylcephalin

Identifiers
CAS Number	998-07-2
3D model (JSmol)	Interactive image
ChemSpider	102883
PubChem CID	9852308
UNII	Z37OX1ASNK
CompTox Dashboard (EPA)	DTXSID601281409
- InChI: InChI=1S/C33H66NO8P/c1-3-5-7-9-11-13-15-17-19-21-23-25-32(35)39-29-31(30-41-43(37,38)40-28-27-34)42-33(36)26-24-22-20-18-16-14-12-10-8-6-4-2/h31H,3-30,34H2,1-2H3,(H,37,38)/t31-/m1/s1 Key: NEZDNQCXEZDCBI-WJOKGBTCSA-N
- SMILES: CCCCCCCCCCCCCC(=O)OC[C@H](COP(=O)(O)OCCN)OC(=O)CCCCCCCCCCCCC

Properties
Chemical formula	C_{33}H_{66}NO_{8}P
Molar mass	635.864 g·mol^{−1}
- Except where otherwise noted, data are given for materials in their standard state (at 25 °C [77 °F], 100 kPa). Infobox references

Dimyristoylphosphatidylethanolamine is a phosphatidylethanolamine. It has been used as part of a model membrane for Gram-negative bacteria.
