= Dipalmitoylphosphatidylethanolamine =

Names
- Systematic IUPAC name 2-Aminoethyl (2R)-2,3-bis(hexadecanoyloxy)propyl hydrogen phosphate
- Other names 1,2-dipalmitoylphosphatidylethanolamine, 1,2-dipalmitoyl-sn-glycero-3-phosphoethanolamine, 1,2-dihexadecanoyl-sn-glycero-3-phosphoethanolamine, DPPE, 16:0 PE, dipalmitoylcephalin

Identifiers
CAS Number	923-61-5
3D model (JSmol)	Interactive image
ChEBI	CHEBI:73127
ChemSpider	393103
DrugBank	DB01728
ECHA InfoCard	100.011.907
EC Number	213-097-1
PubChem CID	445468
UNII	4FWH120Z1Z
CompTox Dashboard (EPA)	DTXSID90919258
- InChI: InChI=1S/C37H74NO8P/c1-3-5-7-9-11-13-15-17-19-21-23-25-27-29-36(39)43-33-35(34-45-47(41,42)44-32-31-38)46-37(40)30-28-26-24-22-20-18-16-14-12-10-8-6-4-2/h35H,3-34,38H2,1-2H3,(H,41,42)/t35-/m1/s1 Key: SLKDGVPOSSLUAI-PGUFJCEWSA-N
- SMILES: CCCCCCCCCCCCCCCC(=O)OC[C@H](COP(=O)(O)OCCN)OC(=O)CCCCCCCCCCCCCCC

Properties
Chemical formula	C_{37}H_{74}NO_{8}P
Molar mass	691.972 g·mol^{−1}
- Except where otherwise noted, data are given for materials in their standard state (at 25 °C [77 °F], 100 kPa). Infobox references

Dipalmitoylphosphatidylethanolamine is a phosphatidylethanolamine. Like other phospholipids, it has been used as part of model bilayer membranes.
