= Small-conductance mechanosensitive channel =

Group of transport proteins

MscS channel

Identifiers
- Symbol: MscS channel
- Pfam: PF00924
- InterPro: IPR006685
- PROSITE: PDOC00959
- SCOP2: 1mxm / SCOPe / SUPFAM
- TCDB: 1.A.23
- OPM superfamily: 11
- OPM protein: 5aji
Available protein structures:
- PDB: IPR006685 PF00924 (ECOD; PDBsum)
- AlphaFold: IPR006685; PF00924

Small conductance mechanosensitive ion channels (MscS) provide protection against hypo-osmotic shock in bacteria, responding both to stretching of the cell membrane and to membrane depolarization. In eukaryotes, they fulfill a multitude of important functions in addition to osmoregulation. They are present in the membranes of organisms from the three domains of life: bacteria, archaea, fungi and plants.

== Structure ==
There are two families of mechanosensitive (MS) channels: large-conductance MS channels (MscL) and small-conductance MS channels (MscS or YGGB). The MscS family is much larger and more variable in size and sequence than the MscL family. MscS family homologues vary in length between 248 and 1120 amino acyl residues and in topology, but the homologous region that is shared by most of them is only 200-250 residues long, exhibiting 4-5 transmembrane regions (TMSs). Much of the diversity in MscS proteins occurs in the number of TMSs, which ranges from three to eleven TMSs, although the three C-terminal helices are conserved.

Crystal structures of the Escherichia coli MscS in the open and closed conformations are available. E. coli MscS folds as a homoheptamer with a cylindrical shape, and can be divided into transmembrane and extramembrane regions: an N-terminal periplasmic region, a transmembrane region, and a C-terminal cytoplasmic region (middle and C-terminal domains). The transmembrane region forms a channel through the membrane that opens into a chamber enclosed by the extramembrane portion, the latter connecting to the cytoplasm through distinct portals.

== Function ==
MS channels function as electromechanical switches with the capability to sense the physical state of lipid bilayers. Interactions with the membrane lipids are responsible for the sensing of mechanical force for most known MS channels. In bacterial and animal systems, MS ion channels are thought to mediate the perception of pressure, touch, and sound. With numerous members now electrophysiologically characterized, these channels displays a breadth of ion selectivity with both anion- and cation-selective members. The selectivities of these channels may be relatively weak in comparison to voltage-gated channels. In addition, some MscS channels may function in amino acid efflux, Ca^{2+} regulation and cell division.

=== Transport reaction ===
The generalized transport reaction proposed for MscS channels is:

Osmolytes (in) and ions (in) ⇌ osmolytes (out) and ions (out)

== Mechanism ==
Application of a ramp of negative pressure to a patch excised from an E. coli giant spheroplast gave a small conductance (MscS; ~1 nS in 400 mM salt) with a sustained open state, and a large conductance (MscL; ~3 nS) with faster kinetics, activated at higher pressure. MscS was reported to exhibit a weak anionic preference and a voltage dependency, tending to open upon depolarization. Activation by membrane-intercalating amphipathic compounds suggested that the MscS channel is sensitive to mechanical perturbations in the lipid bilayer.

Sensitivity towards tension changes can be explained as result of the hydrophobic coupling between the membrane and TMSs of the channel. Pockets in between TMSs were identified in MscS and YnaI that are filled with lipids. Fewer lipids are present in the open state of MscS than the closed. Thus, exclusion of lipid fatty acyl chains from these pockets, as a consequence of increased tension, may trigger gating. Similarly, in the eukaryotic MS channel TRAAK it was found that a lipid chain blocks the conducting path in the closed state.
