= Phosphatidylglycerol =

Lipid

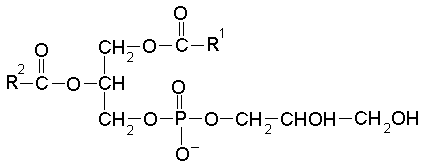
General chemical structure of a phosphatidyl glycerol where R^{1} and R^{2} are fatty acid side chains

Phosphatidylglycerol is a glycerophospholipid found in pulmonary surfactant and in the plasma membrane where it directly activates lipid-gated ion channels.

The general structure of phosphatidylglycerol consists of a L-glycerol 3-phosphate backbone ester-bonded to either saturated or unsaturated fatty acids on carbons 1 and 2. The head group substituent glycerol is bonded through a phosphomonoester. It is the precursor of surfactant and its presence (>0.3) in the amniotic fluid of the newborn indicates fetal lung maturity.

Approximately 98% of alveolar wall surface area is due to the presence of type I cells, with type II cells producing pulmonary surfactant covering around 2% of the alveolar walls. Once surfactant is secreted by the type II cells, it must be spread over the remaining type I cellular surface area. Phosphatidylglycerol is thought to be important in spreading of surfactant over the Type I cellular surface area. The major surfactant deficiency in premature infants relates to the lack of phosphatidylglycerol, even though it comprises less than 5% of pulmonary surfactant phospholipids. It is synthesized by head group exchange of a phosphatidylcholine enriched phospholipid using the enzyme phospholipase D.

== Biosynthesis ==
Biosynthesis of Phosphatidylglycerol

Phosphatidylglycerol (PG) is formed via a complex sequential pathway whereby phosphatidic acid (PA) is first converted to CDP-diacylglyceride by the enzyme CDP-diacylglyceride synthase. Then a PGP synthase enzyme exchanges glycerol-3-phosphate (G3P) for cytidine monophosphase (CMP), forming the temporary intermediate phosphatidylglycerolphosphate (PGP). PG is finally synthesized when a PGP phosphatase enzyme catalyzes the immediate dephosphorylation of the PGP intermediate to form PG. In bacteria, another membrane phospholipid known as cardiolipin can be synthesized by condensing two molecules of phosphatidylglycerol; a reaction catalyzed by the enzyme cardiolipin-synthase. In eukaryotic mitochondria phosphatidylglycerol is converted to cardiolipin by reacting with a molecule of cytidine diphosphate diglyceride in a reaction catalyzed by cardiolipin synthase.

== See also ==
- Glycerol
- Cardiolipin
- Lipid-gated ion channels
