= KCNMA1 =

Voltage-gated potassium channel protein

An Error has occurred retrieving Wikidata item for infobox Calcium-activated potassium channel subunit alpha-1 also known as large conductance calcium-activated potassium channel, subfamily M, alpha member 1 (K_{Ca}1.1), or BK channel alpha subunit, is a voltage gated potassium channel encoded by the KCNMA1 gene and characterized by their large conductance of potassium ions (K+) through cell membranes.

== Function ==
BK channels are activated (opened) by changes in membrane electrical potential and/or by increases in concentration of intracellular calcium ion (Ca^{2+}). Opening of BK channels allows K^{+} to passively flow through the channel, down the electrochemical gradient. Under typical physiological conditions, this results in an efflux of K^{+} from the cell, which leads to cell membrane hyperpolarization (a decrease in the electrical potential across the cell membrane) and a decrease in cell excitability (a decrease in the probability that the cell will transmit an action potential).

BK channels are essential for the regulation of several key physiological processes including smooth muscle tone and neuronal excitability. They control the contraction of smooth muscle and are involved with the electrical tuning of hair cells in the cochlea. BK channels also contribute to the behavioral effects of ethanol in the worm C. elegans under high concentrations (> 100 mM, or approximately 0.50% BAC). It remains to be determined if BK channels contribute to intoxication in humans.

== Structure ==
BK channels have a tetrameric structure. Each monomer of the channel-forming alpha subunit is the product of the KCNMA1 gene. Modulatory beta subunits (encoded by KCNMB1, KCNMB2, KCNMB3, or KCNMB4) can associate with the tetrameric channel. Alternatively spliced transcript variants encoding different isoforms have been identified.

Each BK channel alpha subunit consists of (from N- to C-terminal):

1. A unique transmembrane domain (S0) that precedes the 6 transmembrane domains (S1-S6) conserved in all voltage-dependent K^{+} channels.
2. A voltage sensing domain (S1-S4).
3. A K^{+} channel pore domain (S5, selectivity filter, and S6).
4. A cytoplasmic C-terminal domain (CTD) consisting of a pair of RCK domains that assemble into an octameric gating ring on the intracellular side of the tetrameric channel. The CTD contains four primary binding sites for Ca^{2+}, called "calcium bowls", encoded within the second RCK domain of each monomer.

Calcium-activated BK potassium channel alpha subunit

Identifiers
- Symbol: BK_channel_a
- Pfam: PF03493
- InterPro: IPR003929
Available protein structures:
- PDB: IPR003929 PF03493 (ECOD; PDBsum)
- AlphaFold: IPR003929; PF03493

Available X-ray structures include:

- 3U6N – Open structure of the BK channel gating ring
- 3MT5 – Crystal structure of the human BK gating apparatus
- 3NAF – Structure of the intracellular gating ring from the human high-conductance Ca^{2+} gated K^{+} channel (BK Channel)

== Pharmacology ==
BK channels are pharmacological targets for the treatment of stroke. Various pharmaceutical companies developed synthetic molecules activating these channels in order to prevent excessive neurotoxic calcium entry in neurons. But BMS-204352 (MaxiPost) a molecule developed by Bristol-Myers Squibb failed to improve clinical outcome in stroke patients compared to placebo. BK channels have also been found to be activated by exogenous pollutants and endogenous gasotransmitters carbon monoxide and hydrogen sulphide.

BK channels are blocked by tetraethylammonium (TEA), paxilline and iberiotoxin.

== Related conditions ==
Researchers have identified a rare disease in humans caused by mutations in the gene. KCNMA1-linked channelopathy can cause neurological conditions like seizures and movement disorders. An episode of the Diagnosis TV show, based on a column in the New York Times, was about a young girl with a KCNMA1 disorder that caused transient episodes of muscle weakness.

== See also ==
- BK channel
- Calcium-activated potassium channel
- Voltage-gated potassium channel
