= Tamapin =

Tamapin is a toxin from the Indian Red Scorpion (Hottentotta tamulus), which is a selective and potent blocker of SK2 channels.

== Etymology ==
Tamapin is named after the scorpion from which it was isolated.

== Sources ==
Tamapin has been isolated from hottentotta tamulus, the Indian red scorpion.

== Chemical structure and methods of isolation ==
Tamapin belongs to short-chain scorpion toxin subfamily 5, together with PO5 and Scyllatoxin. Its sequence similarity to other toxins that can compete with the binding site of apamin is much lower. It is 31 amino acids long and its weight is 3458 daltons. Its amino acid sequence is AFCNLRRCELSCRSLGLLGKCIGEECKCVPY, with disulfide bonds between Cys3-Cys21, Cys8-Cys26, and Cys12-Cys28 (chemical formula C_{146}H_{234}N_{42}O_{42}S_{6}).

Tamapin has been isolated via detection of the apamin-competing fraction of the venom from the scorpion via a Sephadex G-50 size exclusion chromatography, followed by high performance liquid chromatography (HPLC). An isoform of tamapin, tamapin-2, has been found, in which the tyrosine is replaced by a histidine. Tamapin-2 can also compete very effectively with apamin for binding to synaptosomes.

== Target and mode of action ==
The target of tamapin is the small conductance calcium-dependent potassium (SK) channel. This scorpion toxin blocks SK2 channels with selectivity for SK2 versus SK1 channels in a largely reversible manner. Despite completely different sequences, Apamin (a bee venom toxin) and tamapin share at least in part, the same binding sites on rat brain synaptosomes. Cloned SK2 are most sensitive for Apamin in binding assays and physiological recordings. However, tamapin displaces Apamin in binding assays and is therefore a stronger toxin with respect to Apamin. SK 1 and SK 3 are only affected with a high concentration of tapamin and therefore this toxin inhibits SK2 with the highest affinity, SK3 intermediate and the lowest affinity for SK1 channels. A less closely related member of the SK channels is the intermediate conductance calcium activated potassium channel SK4, also known as IK1, which is not sensitive to Apamin and is also not affected by Tapamin. The same applies to voltage dependent potassium channels; the block of SK2-mediated currents is not voltage dependent. This specific channel block evokes a reduction in the small conductance calcium-dependent potassium channels current.

== Toxicity ==
Previous studies showed that the effect of tamapin is largely reversible and depends on time and concentration. The Indian red scorpion (Hottentotta tamulus) causes a large number of deaths annually especially among young children. Its venom contains highly specific potassium channel blockers such as iberiotoxin, which is a highly specific blocker of the high conductance calcium activated potassium channel, and tamulustoxin.
