= KCNN3 =

Protein-coding gene

An Error has occurred retrieving Wikidata item for infobox

SK3 (small conductance calcium-activated potassium channel 3) also known as K_{Ca}2.3 is a protein that in humans is encoded by the KCNN3 gene.

SK3 is a small-conductance calcium-activated potassium channel partly responsible for the calcium-dependent after hyperpolarisation current (I_{AHP}). It belongs to a family of channels known as small-conductance potassium channels, which consists of three members – SK1, SK2 and SK3 (encoded by the KCNN1, 2 and 3 genes respectively), which share a 60-70% sequence identity. These channels have acquired a number of alternative names, however a NC-IUPHAR has recently achieved consensus on the best names, K_{Ca}2.1 (SK1), K_{Ca}2.2 (SK2) and K_{Ca}2.3 (SK3). Small conductance channels are responsible for the medium and possibly the slow components of the I_{AHP}.

== Structure ==
K_{Ca}2.3 contains 6 transmembrane domains, a pore-forming region, and intracellular N- and C- termini and is readily blocked by apamin. The gene for K_{Ca}2.3, KCNN3, is located on chromosome 1q21.

== Expression ==
K_{Ca}2.3 is found in the central nervous system (CNS), muscle, liver, pituitary, prostate, kidney, pancreas and vascular endothelium tissues. K_{Ca}2.3 is most abundant in regions of the brain, but has also been found to be expressed in significant levels in many other peripheral tissues, particularly those rich in smooth muscle, including the rectum, corpus cavernosum, colon, small intestine and myometrium.

The expression level of KCNN3 is dependent on hormonal regulation, particularly by the sex hormone estrogen. Estrogen not only enhances transcription of the KCNN3 gene, but also affects the activity of K_{Ca}2.3 channels on the cell membrane. In GABAergic preoptic area neurons, estrogen enhanced the ability of α1 adrenergic receptors to inhibit K_{Ca}2.3 activity, increasing cell excitability. Links have been established between hormonal regulation of sex-organ function and K_{Ca}2.3 expression. The expression of K_{Ca}2.3 in the corpus cavernosum in patients undergoing estrogen treatment as part of gender-reassignment surgery was found to be increased up to 5-fold. The influence of estrogen on K_{Ca}2.3 has also been established in the hypothalamus and in uterine and skeletal muscle.

== Physiology ==
K_{Ca}2.3 channels play a major role in human physiology, particularly in smooth muscle relaxation. The expression level of K_{Ca}2.3 channels in the endothelium influences arterial tone by setting arterial smooth muscle membrane potential. The sustained activity of K_{Ca}2.3 channels induces a sustained hyperpolarisation of the endothelial cell membrane potential, which is then carried to nearby smooth muscle through gap junctions. Blocking the K_{Ca}2.3 channel or suppressing K_{Ca}2.3 expression causes a greatly increased tone in resistance arteries, producing an increase in peripheral resistance and blood pressure.

== Pathology ==
Mutations in K_{Ca}2.3 are suspected to be a possible underlying cause for several neurological disorders, including schizophrenia, bipolar disorder, Alzheimer's disease, anorexia nervosa and ataxia as well as myotonic muscular dystrophy.
