= Kaliotoxin =

Scorpion toxin

Amino acid sequence of kaliotoxin
N – Gly – Val – Glu – Ile – Asn – Val – Lys – Cys – Ser – Gly – Ser – Pro – Gln – Cys – Leu – Lys – Pro – Cys – Lys – Asp – Ala – Gly – Met – Arg – Phe – Gly – Lys – Cys – Met – Asn – Arg – Lys – Cys – His – Cys – Thr – Pro – Lys – OH

Kaliotoxin (KTX) inhibits potassium flux through the Kv1.3 voltage-gated potassium channel and calcium-activated potassium channels by physically blocking the channel-entrance and inducing a conformational change in the K^{+}-selectivity filter of the channel.

== Sources ==
KTX is a neurotoxin derived from the scorpion Androctonus mauretanicus mauretanicus, which is found in the Middle East and North Africa.

== Chemistry ==
Kaliotoxin is a 4-kDa polypeptide chain, containing 38 amino acids. The formula is C_{171}H_{283}N_{55}O_{49}S_{8}. The sequence has a large homology with iberiotoxin from Buthus tumulus, charybdotoxin from Leiurus quinquestriatus and noxiustoxin from Centruroides noxius. An Important site of the toxin is the K27 side chain (a lysine at place 27 of the protein sequence), which enters the pore and protrudes into the selectivity filter of the channel.

== Target ==
KTX binds to the Kv1.3 voltage-gated potassium channel and the Calcium-activated potassium channels (BK channels). These channels control several regulating processes, including neurotransmitter release, heart rate, insulin secretion, smooth muscle contraction. Kv1.3 channels also play a critical role in regulating the function of effector memory T cells, the subset implicated in many autoimmune disorders, and blockade of Kv1.3 channels by kaliotoxin ameliorates disease in rat models of multiple sclerosis and bone resorption due to periodontitis.

== Mode of action ==
The toxin binds to the external vestibule of the channel, and a critical lysine residue (K27), protrudes into the pore and plugs it. The positively charged amino-group of the K27 chain fits into the selectivity filter near the G77 chain (Glycine) of the channel, causing a conformational change of the channels' selectivity filter. Thereby the hydrophobic groups of the K27 side chain replace water molecules in the entry region of the pore. So the pore is blocked by a direct plug into the pore region of the channel and a conformational change in the selectivity filter is induced. By determining the solution structure of kaliotoxin and related toxins, and by using complementary mutagenesis and electrostatic compliance, it was possible to determine the architecture of the toxin binding site at the outer vestibule of the Kv1.3 channel. This vestibule is – 28–32 A wide at its outer margin, – 28–34 A wide at its base, and −4-8 A deep; the pore is 9–14 ~A wide at its external entrance and tapers to a width of 4–5 A at a depth of – 5–7 A from the vestibule. These dimensions are remarkably similar to that of the outer vestibule of the KcsA bacterial channel that was determined by X-ray crystallography.
