= VSN16R =

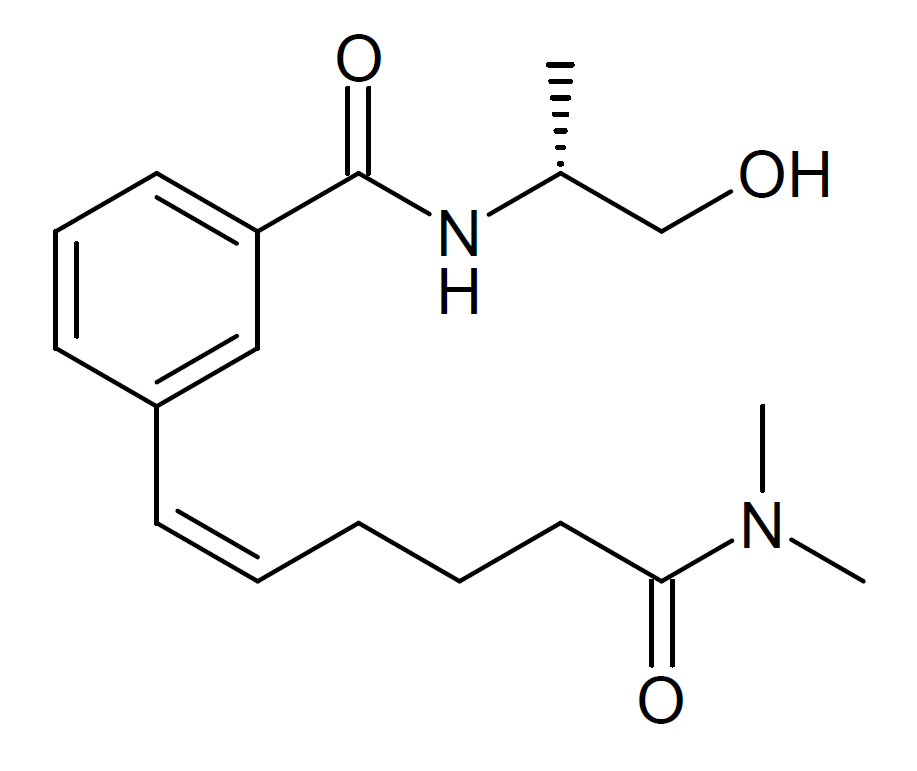

Clinical data
- Other names: SPG601; SPG-601

Identifiers
- IUPAC name: 3-[(Z)-6-(dimethylamino)-6-oxohex-1-enyl]-N-[(2R)-1-hydroxypropan-2-yl]benzamide
- CAS Number: 1246960-09-7
- PubChem CID: 23730084
- ChemSpider: 58827987
- UNII: D2QY1KLG2R
- ChEMBL: ChEMBL6068565

Chemical and physical data
- Formula: C_{18}H_{26}N_{2}O_{3}
- Molar mass: 318.417 g·mol^{−1}
- 3D model (JSmol): Interactive image
- SMILES: C[C@H](CO)NC(=O)C1=CC=CC(=C1)/C=C\CCCC(=O)N(C)C
- InChI: InChI=1S/C18H26N2O3/c1-14(13-21)19-18(23)16-10-7-9-15(12-16)8-5-4-6-11-17(22)20(2)3/h5,7-10,12,14,21H,4,6,11,13H2,1-3H3,(H,19,23)/b8-5-/t14-/m1/s1; Key:SVYRYFAUQHVGAI-BMWLXYDHSA-N

VSN16R (SPG601) is a drug which acts as an opener of BK_{Ca} large-conductance, calcium-activated potassium channels. It is similar in chemical structure to some cannabinoid derivatives such as methanandamide and CB-86, and was originally thought to be an atypical cannabinoid compound, but pharmacological studies showed it to be inactive at both cannabinoid receptors and related receptors such as GPR55, and eventually it was found to be a selective BK_{Ca} channel opener. It has neuroprotective effects and reduces muscle spasticity, and is being researched as a potential therapeutic agent for the treatment of Fragile X syndrome.

== See also ==
- Flindokalner
