= KCNMB2 =

Protein-coding gene in the species Homo sapiens

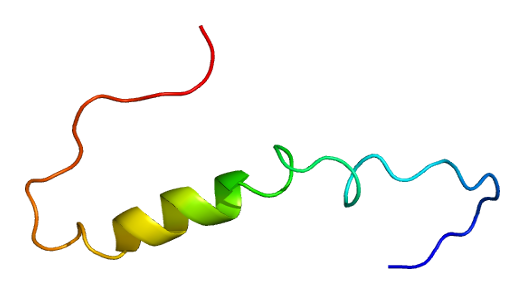

Identifiers
- Aliases: KCNMB2, potassium calcium-activated channel subfamily M regulatory beta subunit 2
- External IDs: OMIM: 605214; MGI: 1919663; GeneCards: KCNMB2
Available structures
PDB	Ortholog search: PDBe RCSB
PDB	List of PDB id codes 1JO6

Gene location (Human)
Chr.	Chromosome 3 (human)
Band	3q26.32	Start	178,272,932 bp
Band	3q26.32	End	178,844,429 bp

Gene location (Mouse)
Chr.	Chromosome 3 (mouse)
Band	3|3 A3	Start	31,956,656 bp
Band	3|3 A3	End	32,254,329 bp
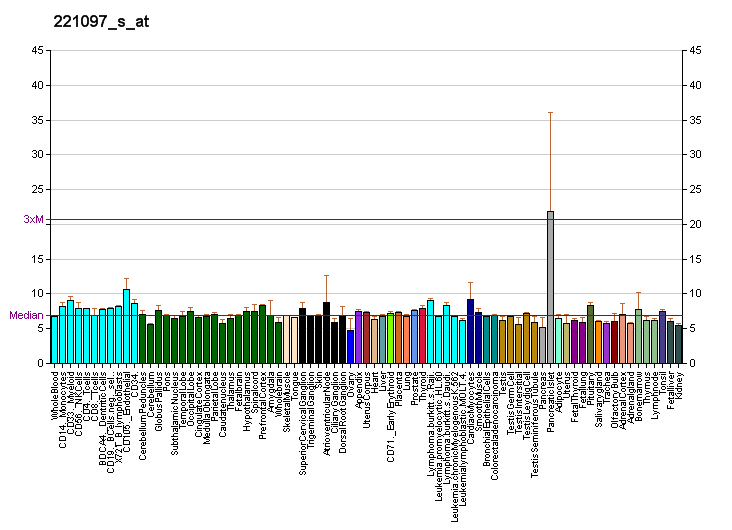
RNA expression pattern
Bgee	Human / Mouse (ortholog); Top expressed in: islet of Langerhans; right uterine tube; testicle; bronchial epithelial cell; caput epididymis; corpus epididymis; cingulate gyrus; anterior cingulate cortex; prefrontal cortex; left ovary / Top expressed in: trigeminal ganglion; islet of Langerhans; olfactory epithelium; superior cervical ganglion; secondary oocyte; carotid body; lumbar spinal ganglion; neural tube; primary oocyte; zygote; More reference expression data
BioGPS	More reference expression data
Gene ontology
Molecular function	potassium channel regulator activity; calcium-activated potassium channel activity; ion channel inhibitor activity
Cellular component	integral component of membrane; voltage-gated potassium channel complex; plasma membrane; integral component of plasma membrane; membrane
Biological process	detection of calcium ion; action potential; potassium ion transport; regulation of vasoconstriction; ion transport; neuronal action potential; chemical synaptic transmission; potassium ion transmembrane transport
Sources:Amigo / QuickGO
Orthologs
Databases	NCBI: entry; OMA: entry
Species	Human	Mouse
Entrez	10242	72413
Ensembl	ENSG00000197584	ENSMUSG00000037610
UniProt	Q9Y691	Q9CZM9
RefSeq (mRNA)	NM_001278911; NM_005832; NM_181361	NM_028231
RefSeq (protein)	NP_001265840; NP_005823; NP_852006	NP_082507
Location (UCSC)	Chr 3: 178.27 – 178.84 Mb	Chr 3: 31.96 – 32.25 Mb
PubMed search
- Wikidata
View/Edit Human	View/Edit Mouse

KCNMB2, ball and chain domain
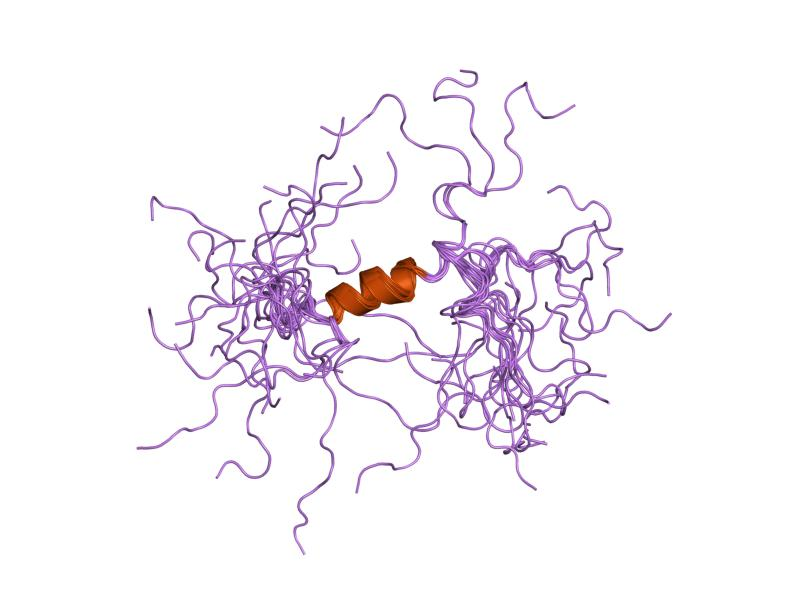
- solution structure of the cytoplasmic n-terminus of the bk beta-subunit kcnmb2

Identifiers
- Symbol: KcnmB2_inactiv
- Pfam: PF09303
- InterPro: IPR015382
Available protein structures:
- PDB: IPR015382 PF09303 (ECOD; PDBsum)
- AlphaFold: IPR015382; PF09303

Calcium-activated potassium channel subunit beta-2 is a protein that in humans is encoded by the KCNMB2 gene.

Big Potassium (BK) channels are large conductance, voltage and calcium-sensitive potassium channels which are fundamental to the control of smooth muscle tone and neuronal excitability. BK channels can contain two distinct subunits: a pore-forming alpha subunit and a modulatory beta subunit. Each complete BK channel contains four copies of the pore-forming alpha subunit and up to four beta subunits. The protein encoded by the KCNMB2 gene is an auxiliary beta subunit which influences the calcium sensitivity of BK currents and, following activation of BK current, causes persistent inactivation. The subunit encoded by the KCNMB2 gene is expressed in various endocrine cells, including pancreas and adrenal chromaffin cells. It is also found in the brain, including the hippocampus. The KCNMB2 gene is homologous to three other genes found in mammalian genomes: KCNMB1 (found primarily in smooth muscle), KCNMB3, and KCNMB4 (the primary brain BK auxiliary subunit).

Calcium-activated potassium channel subunit beta-2 comprises two domains. An N-terminal cytoplasmic domain, the ball and chain domain, which is responsible for the fast inactivation of these channels, and a C-terminal calcium-activated potassium channel beta subunit domain. The N-terminal domain only occurs in calcium-activated potassium channel subunit beta-2, while the C-terminal domain is found in related proteins.

== See also ==
- BK channel
- Voltage-gated potassium channel
