= Chlorzoxazone =

Muscle relaxant

Clinical data
- Trade names: Lorzone, Paraflex, Muscol
- AHFS/Drugs.com: Monograph
- MedlinePlus: a682577
- License data: US DailyMed: Chlorzoxazone
- Routes of administration: By mouth
- Drug class: Skeletal muscle relaxants
- ATC code: M03BB03 (WHO)

Legal status
- Legal status: US: ℞-only

Pharmacokinetic data
- Bioavailability: Well absorbed
- Protein binding: 13–18%
- Metabolism: Hepatic
- Elimination half-life: 1.1 hours
- Duration of action: 3–4 hours
- Excretion: urine (<1%)

Identifiers
- IUPAC name: 5-chloro-3H-benzooxazol-2-one
- CAS Number: 95-25-0
- PubChem CID: 2733
- IUPHAR/BPS: 2322
- DrugBank: DB00356
- ChemSpider: 2632
- UNII: H0DE420U8G
- KEGG: D00771
- ChEBI: CHEBI:3655
- ChEMBL: ChEMBL1371
- CompTox Dashboard (EPA): DTXSID9022813
- ECHA InfoCard: 100.002.186

Chemical and physical data
- Formula: C_{7}H_{4}ClNO_{2}
- Molar mass: 169.56 g·mol^{−1}
- 3D model (JSmol): Interactive image
- SMILES: Clc2cc1c(OC(=O)N1)cc2
- InChI: InChI=1S/C7H4ClNO2/c8-4-1-2-6-5(3-4)9-7(10)11-6/h1-3H,(H,9,10); Key:TZFWDZFKRBELIQ-UHFFFAOYSA-N

Chlorzoxazone (INN) is a centrally acting muscle relaxant used to treat muscle spasm and the resulting pain or discomfort. It can also be administered for acute pain in general and for tension headache (muscle contraction headache). It acts on the spinal cord by depressing reflexes. It is sold under the brand names Lorzone, Paraflex and Muscol and in combination form as Parafon Forte, a combination of chlorzoxazone and acetaminophen (paracetamol). Possible side effects include dizziness, lightheadedness, malaise, nausea, vomiting. In rare cases, chlorzoxazone may cause severe liver dysfunction. Conversely, chlorzoxazone may reduce the liver toxicity of acetaminophen by competitive inhibition.

It is available as a generic medication.

== Pharmacology ==
The mechanism of action of chlorzoxazone is thought to be primarily as an opener of BK_{Ca}, SK_{Ca} and IK_{Ca} calcium-activated potassium channels. General central nervous system depression is the only currently accepted aspect to its medical benefits. Elucidation of the exact mechanism of action is ongoing but there is limited study due to the existence of more effective, safe muscle relaxants (e.g., diazepam, cyclobenzaprine, tizanidine), greatly limiting the potential benefit of identifying novel compounds which share chlorzoxazone's mechanism of action.

== See also ==
- Flindokalner (BMS-204352)
- Zoxazolamine
