= Limbatustoxin =

Limbatustoxin (LbTX; α-KTx 1.4), is an ion channel toxin from the venom of the Centruroides limbatus scorpion. This toxin is a selective blocker of BK channels, calcium-activated potassium channels.

== Etymology and source ==
Limbatustoxin is purified from the venom of the Centruroides limbatus, a bark scorpion that lives in Central America.

== Chemistry ==
Limbatustoxin (LbTX; α-KTx 1.4) is a 37-amino acid peptide, which belongs to the α-KTx 1.x subfamily, a group of short peptides consisting of 36-37 amino acid residues and three disulfide bridges. LbTX displays 57% sequence homology with charybdotoxin and 70% sequence homology with iberiotoxin. LbTX contains a β-sheet formed by three anti-parallel β-strands on one side of the molecule and a helix on the other side. This structure is important for binding to BK channels.

== Target and mode of action ==
Limbatustoxin is highly selective for calcium-activated potassium channels, also called maxi-K channels, slo1 or BK (big potassium) channels. These channels play an important role in the excitability of neurons and the control of muscle contractions. Residues on β-sheet face of the helix as well as residues in the turn between the helix and the second anti-parallel strand and in the second and third strands of the β-sheet are critical for the binding of the toxin to the BK channel. When binding to the channel, limbatustoxin is known to block and inhibit the function of the BK channel. It seems likely that limbatustoxin modifies the gating mechanism of the channel, because the toxin binds to the β-subunit of the channel, which has a modulating function on the gating of the channel. Based on the 70% homology with iberiotoxin, it seems likely that the limbatustoxin selectively inhibits the current through the BK channel by decreasing probability of opening and the time that the channel is open.

== Toxicity ==
The venom causes local burning pain and systemic symptoms, such as parasthesias, flushing, hypertension and wheezing. It is not considered dangerous to humans.
