= Tamulotoxin =

Neurotoxin from the Indian Red Scorpion

Tamulotoxin (or Tamulus toxin, Tamulustoxin, in short form: TmTx) is a venomous neurotoxin from the Indian Red Scorpion (Hottentotta tamulus, Mesobuthus tamulus or Buthus tamulus).

== Chemistry ==
=== Structure ===
The toxin has been classified as a short-chain scorpion toxin. It consists of 36 amino acids and is referred to as TmTx1. A peptide consisting of 35 amino acids has also been identified, referred to as TmTx2. It possesses three intra-molecular disulphide bonds (S-S), leading to a highly stabilized conformation. It also has six cysteine residues which is a characteristic shared by many short-chain scorpion toxins.

=== Family ===
TmTx belongs to the short scorpion toxin superfamily and the potassium channel inhibitor family. Adhering to the nomenclature of Tytgat et al., potassium toxins can be divided into four subgroups: alpha, beta, gamma and kappa. It belongs to the group of alpha potassium toxins (α-KTx: alpha toxin affecting potassium channels). This group contains short-chain peptides of 23-42 acids with three or four disulphide bridges. The primary targets consist of voltage-gated Shaker-related potassium channels, ether-a-go-go related gene (HERG) potassium channels in the heart and calcium activated potassium channels. Within this family, TmTx belongs to the α-KTx 16 subfamily.

=== Homology ===
TmTx shows no homology with other species of scorpion toxins in BLAST of the TmTx sequence, apart from the position of its six cysteine residues. It is nevertheless categorized with other potassium channel scorpion toxins, because it shares the position of its six cysteine residues with other toxins. In phylogeny, TmTx does have similarities with other scorpion neurotoxins.

== Target and mode of action ==
A comparative model has been suggested for the 3D protein structure of TmTx by using information from homologous proteins with known structures. Based on this model, it is highly likely that TmTx blocks calcium activated potassium channels by binding to the S5-S6 segment and thus blocking its pore. The active site of TmTx in this model consists of 5 amino acids, which is essential for the activity of TmTx. These amino acids would be responsible for inhibiting transport of ions. On the other hand, TmTx does not seem to inhibit [^{125}I] apamin binding to synaptic membranes in the rat brain or ionomycin-induced 86Rb^{+} fluxes in C6 cells in vitro. This suggests that TmTx does not have an effect on SK channels or charybdotoxin-sensitive IK channels (calcium-activated potassium channel), respectively. Another suggested target is the Kv1.6 channel, a voltage-gated potassium channel. There are two suggestions for the mode of action. Either it works via blocking the open channel, or there could be a modulation of slow inactivation of this channel. Upon wash, a complete reversal of the block occurred, suggesting that the binding of the toxin to the channel is not very strong.

== Toxicity ==
Injection of the venom of H. tamulus in rats induces hyperventilatory and hypertensive responses and in humans. The toxicity of the venom varies with age and species.

== Treatment ==
Based on the structure, biological compounds can be identified which could have a maximum binding affinity to the active site of TmTx toxin protein and thereby preventing the toxin to bind to the ionic pore of the channel. Therefore, these compounds could in future be used as an antidote for TmTx. Three bioactive compounds have been identified from the plants Andrographis paniculata and Ocimum basilicum. Based on computer models, separate ligands have also been identified, which could block TmTx.
