= Afterhyperpolarization =

Phase of a neuron's action potential

Schematic of an electrophysiological recording of an action potential, showing the various phases that occur as the voltage wave passes a point on a cell membrane. The afterhyperpolarisation is one of the processes that contribute to the refractory period.

Afterhyperpolarization, or AHP, is the hyperpolarizing phase of a neuron's action potential where the cell's membrane potential falls below the normal resting potential. This is also commonly referred to as an action potential's undershoot phase. AHPs have been segregated into "fast", "medium", and "slow" components that appear to have distinct ionic mechanisms and durations. While fast and medium AHPs can be generated by single action potentials, slow AHPs generally develop only during trains of multiple action potentials.

== Fast Afterhyperpolarization ==
Big conductance potassium channels (BK channels) are voltage- and calcium-gated potassium channels that sit very close to N-type calcium channels. During a single action potential, BK channels open in response to membrane depolarization and the rapid influx of calcium. They do not close immediately when the cell repolarizes, which helps produce a quick repolarization phase and a fast after-hyperpolarization (fAHP) lasting about 2–5 ms. The fAHP is especially important in fast-firing neurons because this rapid repolarization supports repetitive firing and improves the precision of spike timing.

== Medium Afterhyperpolarization ==
Small conductance potassium channels (SK channels) are voltage-insensitive but activated by calcium. Together with the calcium-insensitive, voltage-gated Kv7 channels (also called KCNQ channels), they generate the medium after-hyperpolarization (mAHP), which typically lasts 10–100 ms. SK channels are less tightly linked to calcium channels and usually respond only when multiple calcium channels open, which likely contributes to the slower onset of mAHPs. The amplitude and timing of the mAHP help set the interval between spikes, creating a refractory period and regulating firing frequency. SK channels also suppress long-term potentiation (LTP) by reducing dendritic EPSP amplitude, limiting NMDA receptor activation, and decreasing spike backpropagation.

== Slow Afterhyperpolarization ==
The channels responsible for the slow after-hyperpolarization (sAHP) are less well understood, but Kv7, K_{ATP}, and several other potassium channels have been implicated. The sAHP current activates when somatic calcium rises during bursts of action potentials. Calcium-binding proteins such as hippocalcin and neurocalcin δ detect these larger, slower calcium increases and trigger a second-messenger cascade that releases PIP_{2}, which then activates a mix of potassium channels. This indirect signaling pathway helps explain both the delayed onset and long duration of sAHPs, which can last from about 100 ms to several seconds. sAHPs play several key roles: they make neurons less excitable after strong activity, prevent runaway or repetitive firing, stop afterdischarges, and help regulate rhythmic firing in certain neuron types.

AHP Type	Duration	Main Channels	Trigger	Physiological Role
Fast	1–5 ms	BK	Ca²⁺, voltage	Spike repolarization, precision timing
Medium	10–100 ms	SK, Kv7	Ca²⁺, sometime voltage	Controls firing rate; sets interspike interval
Slow	100 ms–1 s+	Mixed K+ channels	Somatic Ca²⁺	Prevents over-excitation; long-term inhibition

== Afterdepolarization ==
The afterhyperpolarized (sAHP) state can be followed by an afterdepolarized state (which is not to be confused with the cardiac afterdepolarization) and can thus set the phase of the subthreshold oscillation of the membrane potential, as reported for the stellate cells of the entorhinal cortex. This mechanism is proposed to be functionally important to maintain the spiking of these neurons at a defined phase of the theta cycle, that, in turn, is thought to contribute to encoding of new memories by the medial temporal lobe of the brain
