= IK channel =

Family of transport proteins

The I_{K} channel (K_{Ca}3.1), which has a conductance of 20–80 pS, is expressed mainly in peripheral tissues such as those of the haematopoietic system, colon, placenta, lung and pancreas. The K_{Ca}3.1 channel in red blood cells was the first Ca^{2+}–sensitive K^{+} channel to be identified and it has been implicated in a wide range of cell functions, including vasodilation of the microvasculature, K^{+} flux across endothelial cells of brain capillaries and the phagocytic activity of neutrophils. K_{Ca}3.1 is of primary importance in the relationship between K^{+} channels and cell proliferation.

In the latter case, a human hIKCa1 gene encodes the channel found in T cells, which is responsible for the hyperpolarization that is required to keep Ca^{2+} flowing into the cell through the I_{CRAC} channels.

In comparison with the large-conductance (BK) channels, K_{Ca}3.1 is much more sensitive to Ca^{2+} and can thus respond to the global level of Ca^{2+}. This high affinity for Ca^{2+} depends upon four resident calmodulin molecules tightly bound to the cytoplasmic tails of the four pore-forming α-subunits. Before the channel can open, Ca^{2+} must bind to each of the calmodulins to induce the co-operative conformational change that opens the gate, which explains why this process has a Hill coefficient of 4. This Ca^{2+}–induced gating process resembles that which has been described for the small-conductance (SK) channels. The fact that calmodulin is prebound to its effector enables the channels to respond to Ca^{2+} very quickly.

The PtdIns3P signaling cassette may play a role in regulating the activity of K_{Ca}3.1. If this signaling lipid is hydrolysed by MTMR6, which is one of the myotubularins, there is a decrease in the activity of the Ca^{2+}–activated channel.

Chlorzoxazone and zoxazolamine are known to be potassium channel openers of IK channels.
