= Flindokalner =

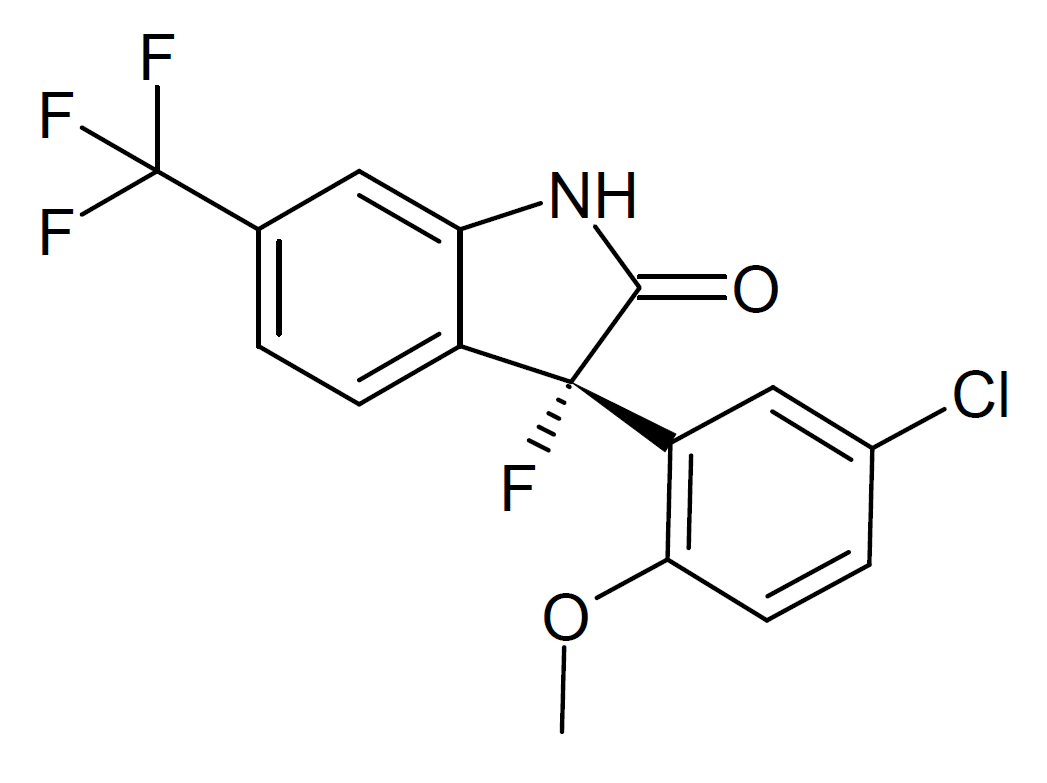

Clinical data
- Other names: BMS-204352; BMS204352; MaxiPost
- ATC code: None

Identifiers
- IUPAC name: (3S)-3-(5-chloro-2-methoxyphenyl)-3-fluoro-6-(trifluoromethyl)-1H-indol-2-one
- CAS Number: 187523-35-9
- PubChem CID: 214350
- IUPHAR/BPS: 2307
- DrugBank: DB16908
- ChemSpider: 185838
- UNII: J57O328W4W
- KEGG: D04192
- ChEBI: CHEBI:34548
- ChEMBL: ChEMBL266510
- CompTox Dashboard (EPA): DTXSID70870176
- ECHA InfoCard: 100.438.134

Chemical and physical data
- Formula: C_{16}H_{10}ClF_{4}NO_{2}
- Molar mass: 359.70 g·mol^{−1}
- 3D model (JSmol): Interactive image
- SMILES: COC1=C(C=C(C=C1)Cl)[C@]2(C3=C(C=C(C=C3)C(F)(F)F)NC2=O)F
- InChI: InChI=1S/C16H10ClF4NO2/c1-24-13-5-3-9(17)7-11(13)15(18)10-4-2-8(16(19,20)21)6-12(10)22-14(15)23/h2-7H,1H3,(H,22,23)/t15-/m0/s1; Key:ULYONBAOIMCNEH-HNNXBMFYSA-N

Flindokalner (BMS-204352, MaxiPost) is a drug which acts as an opener of BK_{Ca} large-conductance, calcium-activated potassium channels. It was unsuccessful in clinical trials as a potential treatment for stroke, but continues to be researched for other applications such as Fragile X syndrome.

== See also ==
- Chlorzoxazone
