= Senicapoc =

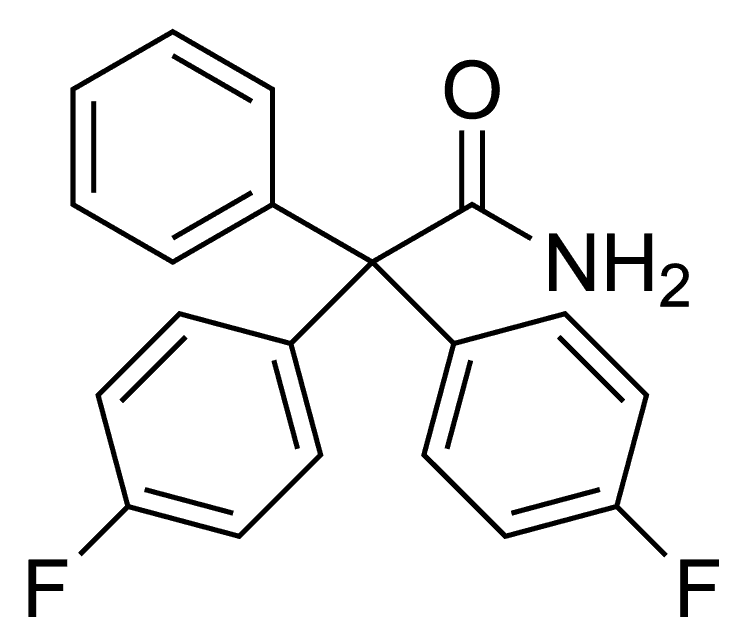

Names
- Preferred IUPAC name 2,2-Bis(4-fluorophenyl)-2-phenylacetamide

Identifiers
| CAS Number | 289656-45-7 |
| 3D model (JSmol) | Interactive image |
| ChemSpider | 187516 |
| IUPHAR/BPS | 2331 |
| KEGG | D06640 |
| PubChem CID | 216327 |
| UNII | TS6G201A6Q |
| CompTox Dashboard (EPA) | DTXSID60276906 |
- InChI: InChI=1S/C20H15F2NO/c21-17-10-6-15(7-11-17)20(19(23)24,14-4-2-1-3-5-14)16-8-12-18(22)13-9-16/h1-13H,(H2,23,24) Key: SCTZUZTYRMOMKT-UHFFFAOYSA-N; InChI=1/C20H15F2NO/c21-17-10-6-15(7-11-17)20(19(23)24,14-4-2-1-3-5-14)16-8-12-18(22)13-9-16/h1-13H,(H2,23,24) Key: SCTZUZTYRMOMKT-UHFFFAOYAR
- SMILES: C1=CC=C(C=C1)C(C2=CC=C(C=C2)F)(C3=CC=C(C=C3)F)C(=O)N

Properties
| Chemical formula | C_{20}H_{15}F_{2}NO |
| Molar mass | 323.34 g/mol |
- Except where otherwise noted, data are given for materials in their standard state (at 25 °C [77 °F], 100 kPa). verify (what is ?) Infobox references

Senicapoc (ICA-17043) is a Gardos channel blocker.

It has been proposed for use in sickle cell anemia. Gardos channel blockers may work in the treatment of sickle cell anemia by blocking the efflux of potassium and water from red blood cells, thereby preventing the dehydration of red blood cells and stopping the polymerization of HbS.

The Gardos channel has been identified as KCNN4.

The "ICA" is for Icagen, which is developing the drug.
