= KCNN4 =

Protein-coding gene in the species Homo sapiens

Identifiers
- Aliases: KCNN4, IK1, IKCA1, KCA4, KCa3.1, SK4, hIKCa1, hKCa4, hSK4, IK, DHS2, potassium calcium-activated channel subfamily N member 4
- External IDs: OMIM: 602754; MGI: 1277957; GeneCards: KCNN4

Gene location (Human)
Chr.	Chromosome 19 (human)
Band	19q13.31	Start	43,766,533 bp
Band	19q13.31	End	43,780,976 bp

Gene location (Mouse)
Chr.	Chromosome 7 (mouse)
Band	7|7 A3	Start	24,069,688 bp
Band	7|7 A3	End	24,086,115 bp
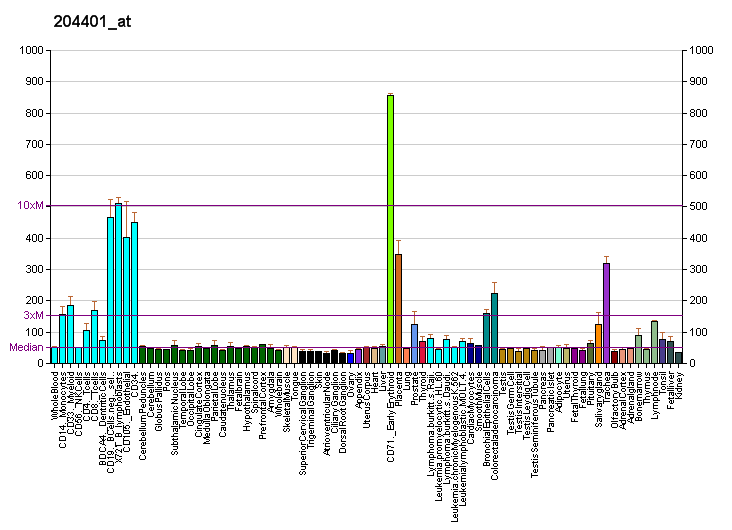
RNA expression pattern
Bgee	Human / Mouse (ortholog); Top expressed in: olfactory zone of nasal mucosa; parotid gland; minor salivary glands; mucosa of transverse colon; granulocyte; skin of leg; trachea; skin of abdomen; placenta; lymph node / Top expressed in: parotid gland; Paneth cell; lacrimal gland; submandibular gland; fetal liver hematopoietic progenitor cell; crypt of lieberkuhn of small intestine; lumbar spinal ganglion; thymus; transitional epithelium of urinary bladder; lymph node; More reference expression data
BioGPS	More reference expression data
Gene ontology
Molecular function	protein binding; protein phosphatase binding; calcium-activated potassium channel activity; potassium channel activity; calmodulin binding; small conductance calcium-activated potassium channel activity; Intermediate conductance calcium-activated potassium channel activity
Cellular component	integral component of membrane; membrane; voltage-gated potassium channel complex; plasma membrane; vesicle; soma; neuron projection
Biological process	calcium ion transport; positive regulation of protein secretion; cell volume homeostasis; potassium ion transport; saliva secretion; ion transport; positive regulation of T cell receptor signaling pathway; immune system process; defense response; phospholipid translocation; stabilization of membrane potential; potassium ion transmembrane transport
Sources:Amigo / QuickGO
Orthologs
Databases	NCBI: entry; OMA: entry
Species	Human	Mouse
Entrez	3783	16534
Ensembl	ENSG00000104783	ENSMUSG00000054342
UniProt	O15554	O89109
RefSeq (mRNA)	NM_002250	NM_001163510; NM_008433
RefSeq (protein)	NP_002241	NP_001156982; NP_032459
Location (UCSC)	Chr 19: 43.77 – 43.78 Mb	Chr 7: 24.07 – 24.09 Mb
PubMed search
- Wikidata
View/Edit Human	View/Edit Mouse

Potassium intermediate/small conductance calcium-activated channel, subfamily N, member 4, also known as KCNN4, is a human gene encoding the K_{Ca}3.1 protein.

== Function ==
The K_{Ca}3.1 protein is part of a potentially heterotetrameric voltage-independent potassium channel that is activated by intracellular calcium. Activation is followed by membrane hyperpolarization, which promotes calcium influx. The encoded protein may be part of the predominant calcium-activated potassium channel in T-lymphocytes. This gene is similar to other KCNN family potassium channel genes, but it differs enough to possibly be considered as part of a new subfamily.

== History ==
The channel activity was first described in 1958 by György Gárdos in human erythrocytes. The channel is also named Gardos channel because of its discoverer.

== See also ==
- SK channel
- Voltage-gated potassium channel
- Senicapoc
