= Calcium-activated potassium channel beta subunit =

CaKB
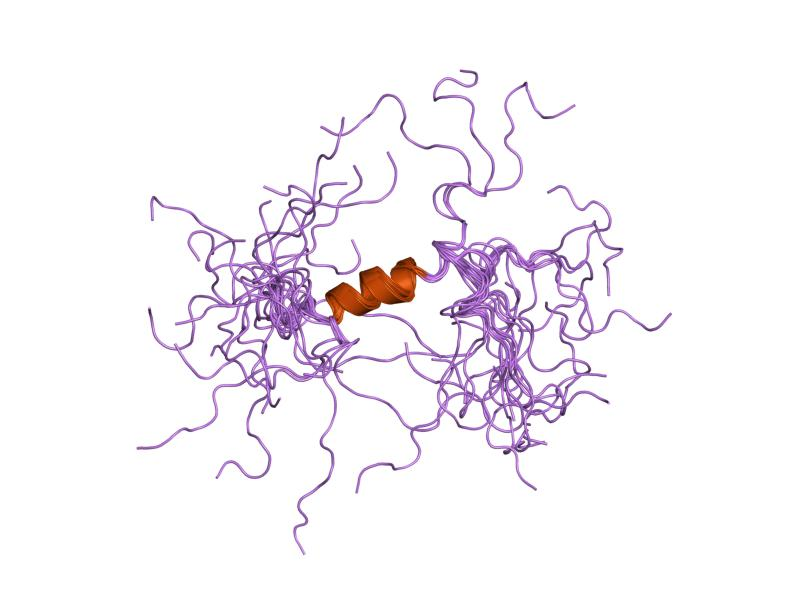
- solution structure of the cytoplasmic n-terminus of the bk beta-subunit kcnmb2

Identifiers
- Symbol: CaKB
- Pfam: PF03185
- InterPro: IPR003930
- SCOP2: 1jo6 / SCOPe / SUPFAM
- TCDB: 8.A.14
Available protein structures:
- PDB: IPR003930 PF03185 (ECOD; PDBsum)
- AlphaFold: IPR003930; PF03185

In molecular biology, the calcium-activated potassium channel beta subunit is a family of proteins comprising the beta subunits of calcium-activated potassium channels.

The functional diversity of potassium channels can arise through homo- or hetero-associations of alpha subunits or association with auxiliary cytoplasmic beta subunits. The beta subunit (which is thought to possess 2 transmembrane domains) increases the calcium sensitivity of the BK channel. It does this by enhancing the time spent by the channel in burst-like open states. However, it has little effect on the durations of closed intervals between bursts, or on the numbers of open and closed states entered during gating.
