= KCNU1 =

Protein-coding gene in the species Homo sapiens

Identifiers
- Aliases: KCNU1, KCNMC1, KCa5, KCa5.1, Kcnma3, Slo3, potassium calcium-activated channel subfamily U member 1
- External IDs: OMIM: 615215; MGI: 1202300; GeneCards: KCNU1
Available structures
PDB	Ortholog search: PDBe RCSB
PDB	List of PDB id codes 4HPF

Gene location (Mouse)
Chr.	Chromosome 8 (mouse)
Band	8|8 A2	Start	26,339,651 bp
Band	8|8 A2	End	26,427,967 bp
RNA expression pattern
Bgee	Human / Mouse (ortholog); Top expressed in: sperm; bone marrow cell; caput epididymis; substantia nigra; monocyte; mammary gland; breast; subcutaneous adipose tissue; male reproductive gland; prostate / Top expressed in: spermatid; morula; lumbar spinal ganglion; seminiferous tubule; spermatocyte; facial motor nucleus; blastocyst; islet of Langerhans; embryo; anterior horn of spinal cord; More reference expression data
BioGPS	n/a
Gene ontology
Molecular function	voltage-gated potassium channel activity; large conductance calcium-activated potassium channel activity; ion channel activity; potassium channel activity; voltage-gated ion channel activity; calcium-activated potassium channel activity; outward rectifier potassium channel activity
Cellular component	integral component of membrane; voltage-gated potassium channel complex; plasma membrane; membrane
Biological process	potassium ion transport; regulation of ion transmembrane transport; ion transport; transmembrane transport; potassium ion transmembrane transport; sperm-egg recognition; reproductive process; regulation of membrane potential
Sources:Amigo / QuickGO
Orthologs
Databases	NCBI: entry
Species	Human	Mouse
Entrez	157855	16532
Ensembl	n/a	ENSMUSG00000031576
UniProt	A8MYU2	O54982
RefSeq (mRNA)	NM_001031836	NM_008432
RefSeq (protein)	NP_001027006	NP_032458
Location (UCSC)	n/a	Chr 8: 26.34 – 26.43 Mb
PubMed search
- Wikidata
View/Edit Human	View/Edit Mouse

Potassium channel, subfamily U, member 1, also known as KCNU1, is a gene encoding the K_{Ca}5.1 protein.

Although this channel is structurally related to the calcium-activated potassium channels, it cannot be classified as such since it is activated by high intracellular pH and relatively insensitive to changes in calcium concentrations.
