= Zoxazolamine =

Withdrawn muscle relaxant drug

Clinical data
- Other names: McN-485
- Routes of administration: Oral

Legal status
- Legal status: AU: S4 (Prescription only)

Identifiers
- IUPAC name: 5-Chloro-1,3-benzoxazol-2-amine
- CAS Number: 61-80-3
- PubChem CID: 6103
- ChemSpider: 5878
- UNII: 9DOW362Q29
- KEGG: C13841
- ChEBI: CHEBI:35053
- ChEMBL: ChEMBL472566

Chemical and physical data
- Formula: C_{7}H_{5}ClN_{2}O
- Molar mass: 168.58 g·mol^{−1}
- 3D model (JSmol): Interactive image
- SMILES: C1=CC2=C(C=C1Cl)N=C(O2)N
- InChI: InChI=InChI=1S/C7H5ClN2O/c8-4-1-2-6-5(3-4)10-7(9)11-6/h1-3H,(H2,9,10); Key:YGCODSQDUUUKIV-UHFFFAOYSA-N

Zoxazolamine (INN, USAN, BAN) (brand name Contrazole, Deflexol, Flexin, Miazol, Uri-Boi, Zoxamine, Zoxine) is a muscle relaxant that is no longer marketed. It was synthesized in 1953 and introduced clinically in 1955 but was withdrawn due to hepatotoxicity. One of its active metabolites, chlorzoxazone, was found to show less toxicity, and was subsequently marketed in place of zoxazolamine. These drugs activate IK_{Ca} channels.
