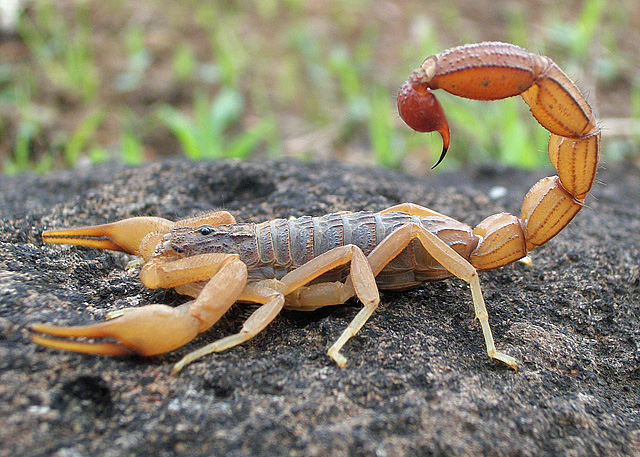
- Hottentotta tamulus from Mangaon, Maharashtra, India

Scientific classification
- Kingdom: Animalia
- Phylum: Arthropoda
- Subphylum: Chelicerata
- Class: Arachnida
- Order: Scorpiones
- Family: Buthidae
- Genus: Hottentotta
- Species: H. tamulus

Binomial name
- Hottentotta tamulus (Fabricius, 1798) NMPC (Note: No specimen number specified.) (male, neotype)

Synonyms
- H. tamulus concanensis (Pocock, 1900); H. tamulus sindicus (Pocock, 1900); H. tamulus gujaratensis (Pocock, 1900); H. tamulus gangeticus (Pocock, 1900); Scorpio tamulus Fabricius, 1787; Buthus nigro lineatus Dufour, 1856; Buthus grammurus Thorell, 1889; Buthus tamulus concanensis Pocock, 1900; Buthus tamulus sindicus Pocock, 1900; Buthus tamulus gujaratensis Pocock, 1900; Buthus tamulus gangeticus Pocock, 1900

= Hottentotta tamulus =

Species of scorpion

Hottentotta tamulus, the Indian red scorpion, also known as the eastern Indian scorpion, is a species of scorpion of the family Buthidae. It occurs in most of India, eastern Pakistan and the eastern lowlands of Nepal, and recently from Sri Lanka.

== Taxonomy ==
This species was named Scorpio tamulus by J.C. Fabricius in 1798. The species name was apparently derived from the occurrence in the state/province of the Tamil people of southeastern India. It was later often referred to the genera Buthus or Mesobuthus, although it was already correctly placed in Hottentotta by A. A. Birula in 1914, a referral that was confirmed again by F. Kovařík in 2007. Nevertheless, the binomen Mesobuthus tamulus is traditionally widespread in the popular and scientific literature. R.I. Pocock (1900) distinguished five subspecies according to coloration and distribution, but these are color-morphs (individuals with varying color) rather than subspecies.

== Description ==
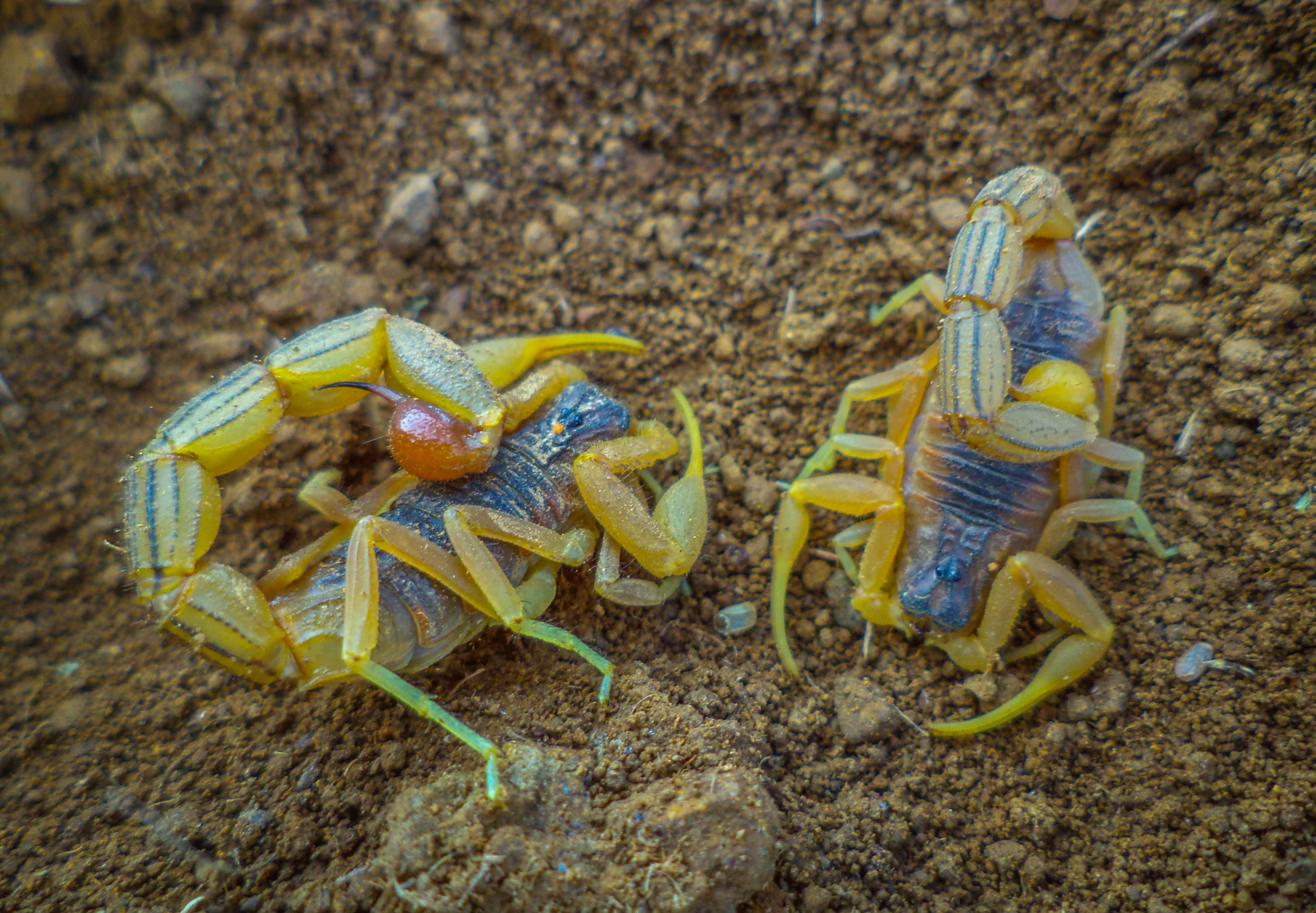
Hottentotta tamulus from Satara, Maharashtra, India

Total body length is about 50 to 90 mm.

The walking legs and the tip of the pedipalp pincers are bright orange-yellow to light reddish-brown in color. The mesosomal tergites always bear three distinct carinae. Their habitus is typical of buthid scorpions, with rather small pedipalp pincers, moderately thickened metasomal segments and a rather bulbous telson with large stinger. The base of the pedipalp pincers (manus) is slightly more inflated in males than in females.

=== Toxicity ===
This species is of great medical significance in densely populated areas of India and Nepal and occasionally causes human fatalities. Fatality rates of 8–40% have been reported in clinical studies; most victims are children.

Symptoms of envenomation by this species include:

- Severe local pain
- Vomiting
- Sweating
- Priapism
- Cyanosis
- Unconsciousness
- Muscular convulsions
- Breathlessness
- Pink frothy sputum
- Abnormal heart rhythms
- A fast or slow heart rate
- Low or high blood pressure
- Acute myocarditis
- Shock
- Death

The venom mainly affects the cardiovascular and pulmonary system, eventually leading to a pulmonary oedema, which may cause death. Scorpion antivenom has little effect in clinical treatment but application of prazosin reduces the mortality rate to less than 4%. As in other scorpions, the venom of H. tamulus consists of a complex mixture of proteins. Some major components have been isolated, including the toxin tamapin. Scorpion envenomation with high morbidity and mortality is usually due to either excessive autonomic activity and cardiovascular toxic effects or neuromuscular toxic effects. Antivenin is the specific treatment for scorpion envenomation combined with supportive measures including vasodilators in patients with cardiovascular toxic effects and benzodiazepines when there is neuromuscular involvement. Although rare, severe hypersensitivity reactions including anaphylaxis to scorpion antivenin (SAV) are possible.

== Habitat and ecology ==
Despite its medical importance, little is known about the ecology and habitat preferences of this species. It is widespread across vegetated lowlands with subtropical to tropical, humid climate and often lives close to or in human settlements, especially in rural areas. A study from Saswad-Jejuri, Pune (western India) has found H. tamulus in a wide range of microhabitats, including scrubland and veld with stones, red and black soil in cropland, loamy, grassy and stony hillslopes and -tops, black soil in mango orchards, Eucalyptus plantations, and under tree bark. With an abundance of 48.43% it was by far the most abundant of the six scorpion species recorded in this study. It occurs rather seldom under tree bark, a habitat dominated by its sister species Hottentotta pachyurus (8.9% versus 91.1% abundance). As all other scorpions, H. tamulus is nocturnal, preying upon small invertebrates and even small vertebrates like lizards. Encounters with humans mainly occur during the night or early morning, when the scorpions accidentally crawl into beds or fall from ceilings.

== In Sri Lanka ==
Originally, H. tamulus was not found in Sri Lanka. But from 2010 to 2013, experiments and other medical reports suggest that the species is also present in Sri Lanka. Few deaths were recorded from Jaffna peninsula in recent times. After observing medical reports and patients, a research team found three dead scorpion specimens and five live specimens as well. After a series of observations from the research team and other international scientists, it was revealed that the scorpion specimens belong to the species H. tamulus.

Deaths from H. tamulus were recorded in 2006, 2007 and 2009 as one patient per year. No cases were recorded in 2010. In 2011, 12 children in Jaffna died due to H. tamulus stings. In 2012, 80 patients were recorded. Out of them, 52% were female, 48% were male. 30% from them were children between the age 3 and 12.

In 2013, many H. tamulus stings were recorded, as many as four each week, again mostly in women and children. Usually, the drug Prazosin is recommended for H. tamulus stings. The drug can reduce the increasing blood pressure.

== See also ==
- Tamapin
- Tamulotoxin
- Iberiotoxin
