= Penicillium paxilli =

Scientific classification
- Domain: Eukaryota
- Kingdom: Fungi
- Division: Ascomycota
- Class: Eurotiomycetes
- Order: Eurotiales
- Family: Aspergillaceae
- Genus: Penicillium
- Species: P. paxilli

Binomial name
- Penicillium paxilli Bainier, G. 1907

Type strain
- ATCC 10480, CBS 360.48, FRR 2008, IAM 7103, IMI 040226, JCM 22546, KY 942, MUCL 38787, NRR 2008, NRRL 2008, NRRL A-1200, QM 725

Species of fungus

Penicillium paxilli is an anamorph, saprophytic species of the genus Penicillium which produces paxilline, paxisterol, penicillone, pyrenocine A, paspaline B and verruculogene. Penicillium paxilli is used as a model to study the biochemistry of the indole-diterepene biosynthesis
