= Paxilline =

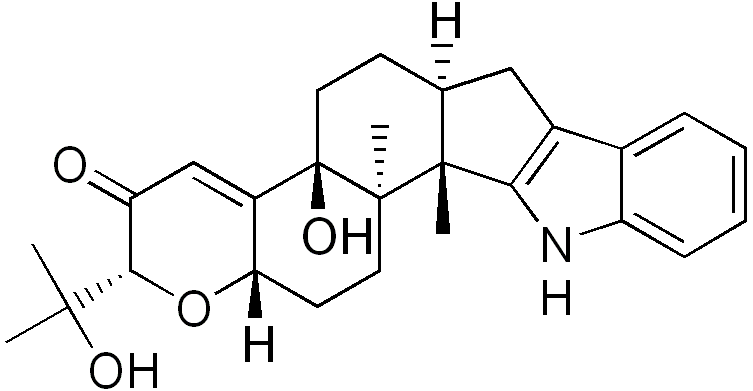

Names
- Preferred IUPAC name (2R,4bS,6aS,12bS,12cR,14aS)-4b-Hydroxy-2-(2-hydroxypropan-2-yl)-12b,12c-dimethyl-5,6,6a,7,12,12b,12c,13,14,14a-decahydro-2H-[1]benzopyrano[5′,6′:6,7]indeno[1,2-b]indol-3(4bH)-one

Identifiers
CAS Number	57186-25-1
3D model (JSmol)	Interactive image
ChEBI	CHEBI:34907
ChEMBL	ChEMBL410063
ChemSpider	94753
ECHA InfoCard	100.164.932
MeSH	Paxilline
PubChem CID	105008
UNII	3T9U9Z96L7
CompTox Dashboard (EPA)	DTXSID10972643
- InChI: InChI=1S/C27H33NO4/c1-24(2,30)23-20(29)14-18-21(32-23)10-11-25(3)26(4)15(9-12-27(18,25)31)13-17-16-7-5-6-8-19(16)28-22(17)26/h5-8,14-15,21,23,28,30-31H,9-13H2,1-4H3/t15-,21-,23-,25+,26+,27+/m0/s1 Key: ACNHBCIZLNNLRS-UBGQALKQSA-N; InChI=1/C27H33NO4/c1-24(2,30)23-20(29)14-18-21(32-23)10-11-25(3)26(4)15(9-12-27(18,25)31)13-17-16-7-5-6-8-19(16)28-22(17)26/h5-8,14-15,21,23,28,30-31H,9-13H2,1-4H3/t15-,21-,23-,25+,26+,27+/m0/s1 Key: ACNHBCIZLNNLRS-UBGQALKQBX
- SMILES: O=C5/C=C6/[C@]4(O)CC[C@H]3Cc2c1ccccc1[nH]c2[C@@]3([C@]4(CC[C@@H]6O[C@@H]5C(O)(C)C)C)C

Properties
Chemical formula	C_{27}H_{33}NO_{4}
Molar mass	435.56 g/mol
- Except where otherwise noted, data are given for materials in their standard state (at 25 °C [77 °F], 100 kPa). verify (what is ?) Infobox references

Paxilline is a toxic, tremorgenic diterpene indole polycyclic alkaloid molecule produced by Penicillium paxilli which was first characterized in 1975. Paxilline is one of a class of tremorigenic mycotoxins, is a potassium channel blocker, and is potentially genotoxic.

Paxilline was found to significantly extend the lifespan, healthspan, and mobility of aged C. elegans worms, but had no such effect on young worms. Paxilline was not found to induce seizures when injected intracerebroventricularly in mice but paradoxically had anticonvulsant activity against picrotoxin and pentylenetetrazol seizures in mice. It has also been used in mice to induce autism-like behaviors through inhibition of the BK channel.

== Biosynthesis ==
Paxiline biosynthesis starts with the synthesis of geranylgeranyl pyrophosphate via the terpenoid pathway and indole-3-glycerol phosphate, which is an intermediate in the tryptophan biosynthesis pathway. By expressing six genes known to be necessary for Paxilline synthesis in Aspergillus oryzae, the further steps in the biosynthesis were identified; two epoxidations and two cyclizations yield paspaline, then two oxidation reactions and a demethylation complete the synthesis. This biosynthesis is notable for its unusual stereospecific polycyclization mechanism that has not been replicated in a chemical synthesis, though other mechanisms have been devised for total synthesis of Paxilline. Paxilline has also been found to be mono- or di-prenylated with DMAPP by an atypical prenyltransferase enzyme.
