= CB-86 =

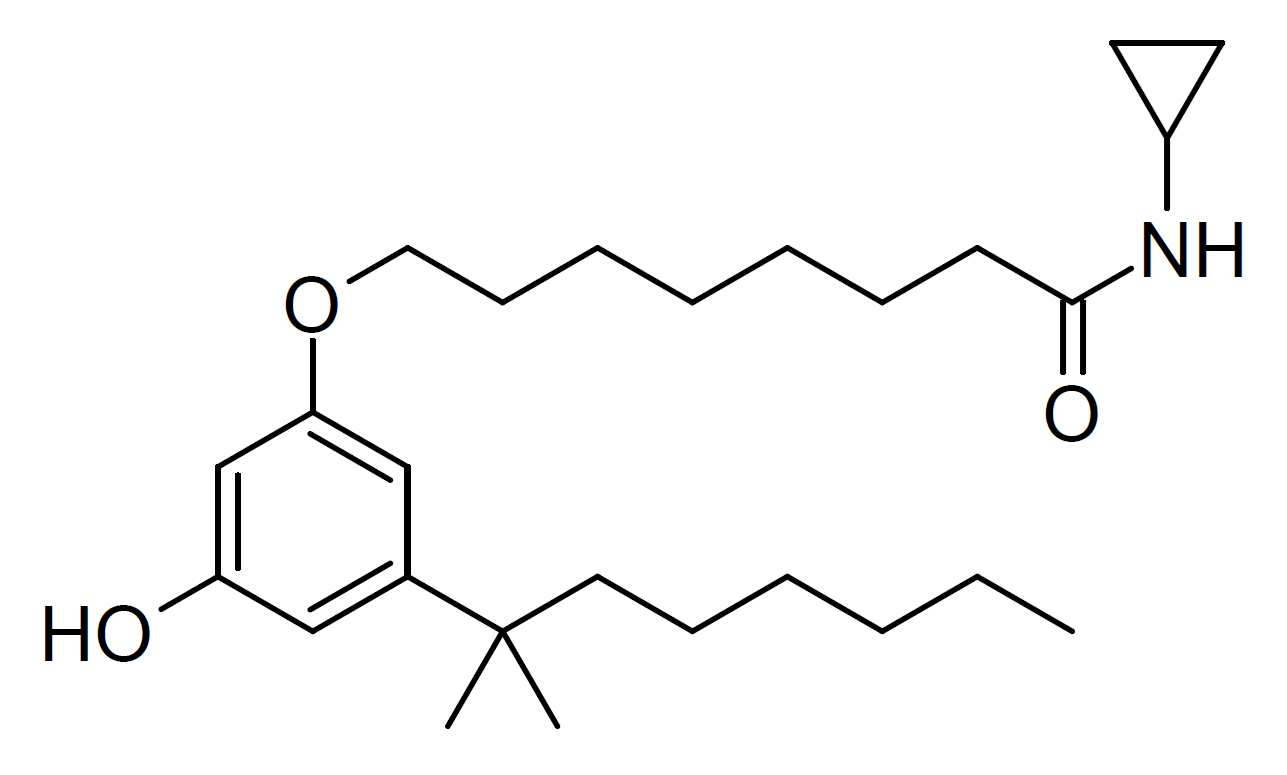

Identifiers
- IUPAC name: N-cyclopropyl-8-[3-hydroxy-5-(2-methyloctan-2-yl)phenoxy]octanamide
- CAS Number: 1150586-64-3
- PubChem CID: 42625202
- ChemSpider: 24705451
- ChEMBL: ChEMBL490648

Chemical and physical data
- Formula: C_{26}H_{43}NO_{3}
- Molar mass: 417.634 g·mol^{−1}
- 3D model (JSmol): Interactive image
- SMILES: CCCCCCC(C)(C)C1=CC(=CC(=C1)OCCCCCCCC(=O)NC2CC2)O
- InChI: InChI=1S/C26H43NO3/c1-4-5-6-11-16-26(2,3)21-18-23(28)20-24(19-21)30-17-12-9-7-8-10-13-25(29)27-22-14-15-22/h18-20,22,28H,4-17H2,1-3H3,(H,27,29); Key:PVAOGZXUOOHSMN-UHFFFAOYSA-N

CB-86 is a synthetic cannabinoid drug which was developed as a hybrid between classical/nonclassical cannabinoids such as THC and CP 47,497 with endogenous cannabinoid ligands such as anandamide. It acts as a partial agonist at CB1 receptors with a K_{i} of 5.6 nM, and an antagonist of CB2 receptors with a K_{i} of 7.9 nM. It has analgesic effects in studies on mice.

== See also ==
- CB-13
- O-1812
- O-1871
