= Electrical tuning =

Electrical tuning is a mechanism by which vertebrates such as frogs and reptiles, which lack a long cochlea, discriminate sound. Mammals have long cochleae, and are able to distinguish different sounds by mechanisms such as mechanical tuning, in which the stiffness and length of hair cells’ stereocilia makes a given cell best suited to respond to a certain type of stimulus. The basilar membrane of animals with long cochleae also vibrates at different locations along the membrane in response to different frequency sounds. Since the reptilian ear lacks a long cochlea, electrical tuning provides an alternative mechanism for perceiving differences in sound.

With a combination of voltage-gated calcium channels and calcium sensitive K^{+} channels, the cells set up an oscillation in voltage and oscillate in response to a depolarizing stimulus. Ca^{++} enters the cell and depolarizes it, opening K^{+} channels which allow K^{+} to leave and hyperpolarize the cell. Since the exit of K^{+} from the cell is delayed, the voltage increases, but then with the exit of the K^{+} the cell overshoots the membrane potential and hyperpolarizes. Different cells have different delays for K^{+} leaving and thus the voltage oscillates at different frequencies. The delays can be as short as 0.7 ms or as long as 150 ms, whereas the Ca^{2+} entry always occurs within about 1 ms. Thus, by varying the length of delay for K^{+} to leave, cells' ion concentrations can oscillate at specific frequencies. Cells with higher oscillating frequencies respond best to higher-frequency sounds, while those with lower frequencies respond best to lower frequency ones. Which cells resonate best with a given sound tells the brain what the frequency of the sound is. Hair cells that respond to high frequency stimuli send information to specific neurons, and the information remains segregated in the brain. Thus, information about sound frequency is preserved, rather than being lost as it would if all information from different hair cells converged on the same neuron or group of neurons.
