= Rck-2 =

Rck-2 is a gene that plays a major role in clock control of translation. Rck-2 protein is a kinase and is rhythmically activated through phosphorylation events based on the periodicity of the clock. Rck-2 activation is directly associated with the phosphorylation of eEF-2, which is an elongation factor that plays a major role in translation. Phosphorylation of eEF-2 has an inhibitory effect on the activity of translation. Rck-2 is largely studied in Neurospora crassa but has significant homology to humans. Knockout strains have been produced in the model organism N. crassa but there are no human pathologies associated with its deletion. While the basic mechanisms of circadian transcriptional control are known, little is understood about how the clock controls mRNA translation, which makes the characterization of pathways responsible for translational control all the more important.
