= Slow afterhyperpolarization =

Slow afterhyperpolarisation (sAHP) refers to prolonged periods of hyperpolarisation in a neuron or cardiomyocyte following an action potential or other depolarising event. In neurons, trains of action potentials may be required to induce sAHPs; this is unlike fast AHPs that require no more than a single action potential. A variety of ionic mechanism may contribute to sAHPs, including potassium efflux from calcium- or sodium- activated potassium channels, and/or the electrogenic response of the sodium-potassium ATPase, and different mechanisms may underlie the sAHP at different temperatures. Depending on neuron type and stimulus used for induction, slow afterhyperpolarisations can last for one second to several tens of seconds, during which time the sAHP effectively inhibits neural activity. Fast and Medium AHPs have shorter durations and different ionic mechanisms.

== See also ==
- Afterhyperpolarization
- Calcium-activated potassium channel
- Sodium-activated potassium channel
- Sodium pump
