= KCNN2 =

Protein-coding gene in the species Homo sapiens

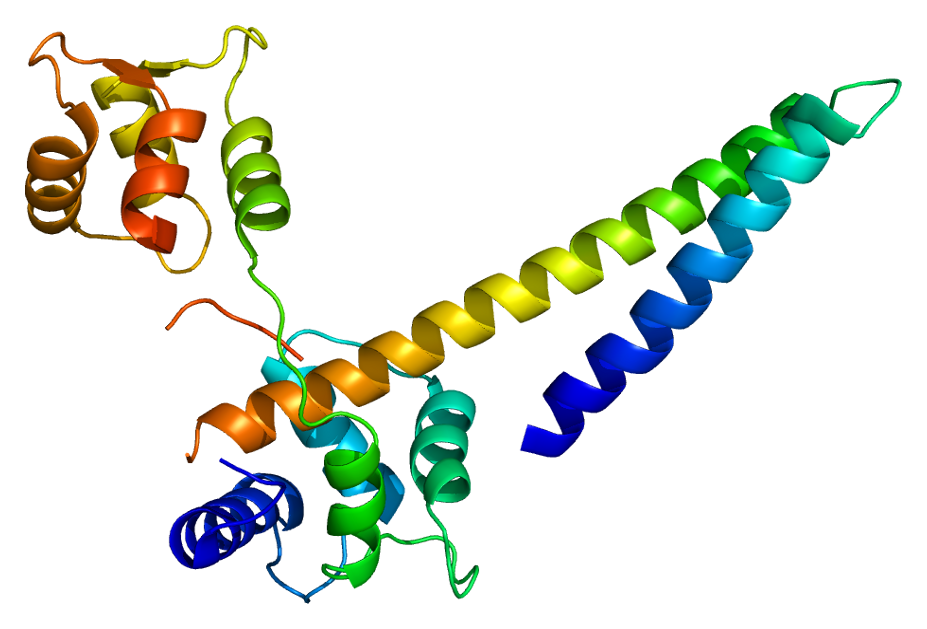

Identifiers
- Aliases: KCNN2, KCa2.2, SK2, SKCA2, SKCa 2, hSK2, potassium calcium-activated channel subfamily N member 2, DYT34, NEDMAB
- External IDs: OMIM: 605879; MGI: 2153182; GeneCards: KCNN2

Gene location (Human)
| Chr. | Chromosome 5 (human) |
| Band | 5q22.3 | Start | 114,055,926 bp |
| Band | 5q22.3 | End | 114,496,500 bp |

Gene location (Mouse)
| Chr. | Chromosome 18 (mouse) |
| Band | 18|18 B3-C | Start | 45,268,860 bp |
| Band | 18|18 B3-C | End | 45,686,024 bp |
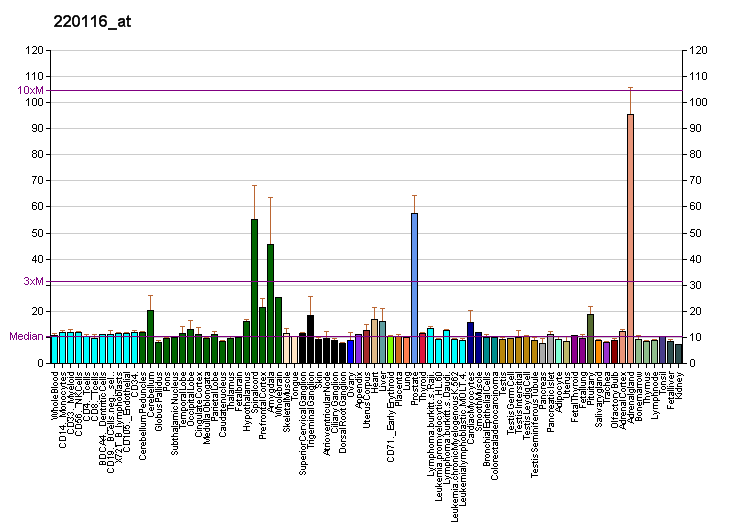
RNA expression pattern
| Bgee | Human / Mouse (ortholog); Top expressed in: secondary oocyte; right adrenal gland; right adrenal cortex; left adrenal gland; left adrenal cortex; Region I of hippocampus proper; Brodmann area 23; middle temporal gyrus; gonad; testicle / Top expressed in: adrenal gland; dentate gyrus of hippocampal formation granule cell; primary visual cortex; cerebellar cortex; subiculum; Region I of hippocampus proper; hippocampus proper; lateral geniculate nucleus; primary motor cortex; superior frontal gyrus; More reference expression data |
| BioGPS | More reference expression data |
Gene ontology
| Molecular function | protein homodimerization activity; protein domain specific binding; calcium-activated potassium channel activity; calmodulin binding; alpha-actinin binding; protein binding; small conductance calcium-activated potassium channel activity |
| Cellular component | integral component of membrane; membrane; cell surface; soma; plasma membrane; Z discdkac; dendritic spine; neuron projection |
| Biological process | ion transport; potassium ion transport; regulation of potassium ion transmembrane transport; potassium ion transmembrane transport; membrane repolarization during atrial cardiac muscle cell action potential |
Sources:Amigo / QuickGO
Orthologs
| Databases | NCBI: entry; OMA: entry |
| Species | Human | Mouse |
| Entrez | 3781 | 140492 |
| Ensembl | ENSG00000080709 | ENSMUSG00000054477 |
| UniProt | Q9H2S1 | P58390 |
| RefSeq (mRNA) | NM_001278204; NM_021614; NM_170775; NM_001372233 | NM_080465; NM_001312905 |
| RefSeq (protein) | NP_001265133; NP_067627; NP_740721; NP_001359162 | NP_001299834; NP_536713 |
| Location (UCSC) | Chr 5: 114.06 – 114.5 Mb | Chr 18: 45.27 – 45.69 Mb |
| PubMed search |
- Wikidata
| View/Edit Human | View/Edit Mouse |

Potassium intermediate/small conductance calcium-activated channel, subfamily N, member 2, also known as KCNN2, is a protein which in humans is encoded by the KCNN2 gene. KCNN2 is an ion channel protein also known as K_{Ca}2.2.

== Function ==
Action potentials in vertebrate neurons are followed by an afterhyperpolarization (AHP) that may persist for several seconds and may have profound consequences for the firing pattern of the neuron. Each component of the AHP is kinetically distinct and is mediated by different calcium-activated potassium channels. The K_{Ca}2.2 protein is activated before membrane hyperpolarization and is thought to regulate neuronal excitability by contributing to the slow component of synaptic AHP. K_{Ca}2.2 is an integral membrane protein that forms a voltage-independent calcium-activated channel with three other calmodulin-binding subunits. This protein is a member of the calcium-activated potassium channel family. Two transcript variants encoding different isoforms have been found for the KCNN2 gene.

In a 2009 study, SK2 (KCNN2) potassium channel was overexpressed in the basolateral amygdala using a herpes simplex viral system. This reduced anxiety and stress-induced corticosterone secretion at a systemic level. SK2 overexpression also reduced dendritic arborization of the amygdala neurons. In a 2015 study, it was found that UBE3A, the protein maternally deleted in Angelman syndrome, marks KCNN2 for degradation in the hippocampus, and that UBE3A deficiency is associated with an increase in KCNN2 levels. KCNN2 operates through a negative feedback loop to reduce glutamatergic NMDA receptor activation when it itself is activated by that same receptor. Angelman syndrome therefore leads to a reduction in glutamatergic NMDA receptor activation, which impairs long-term potentiation of hippocampal neurons and thus fear conditioning.

== Target of acaricide ==
The corresponding K_{Ca}2 channel in the spider mite tetranychus urticae is the target of the acaricide acynonapyr in IRAC group 33.

== See also ==
- SK channel
- Voltage-gated potassium channel
