= KCNN1 =

Protein-coding gene in the species Homo sapiens

Identifiers
- Aliases: KCNN1, KCa2.1, SK1, SKCA1, hSK1, potassium calcium-activated channel subfamily N member 1
- External IDs: OMIM: 602982; MGI: 1933993; GeneCards: KCNN1

Gene location (Human)
Chr.	Chromosome 19 (human)
Band	19p13.11	Start	17,951,293 bp
Band	19p13.11	End	18,000,080 bp
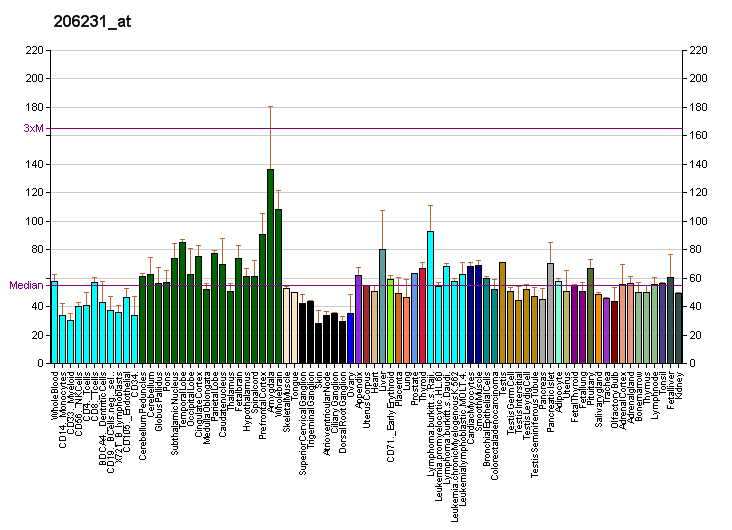
RNA expression pattern
Bgee	Human / Mouse (ortholog); Top expressed in: right frontal lobe; cingulate gyrus; anterior cingulate cortex; prefrontal cortex; amygdala; Region I of hippocampus proper; dorsolateral prefrontal cortex; Brodmann area 9; ganglionic eminence; putamen / n/a; More reference expression data
BioGPS	More reference expression data
Gene ontology
Molecular function	small conductance calcium-activated potassium channel activity; calcium-activated potassium channel activity; calmodulin binding; protein heterodimerization activity
Cellular component	integral component of membrane; voltage-gated potassium channel complex; soma; plasma membrane; membrane; neuron projection
Biological process	potassium ion transport; ion transport; potassium ion transmembrane transport; chemical synaptic transmission
Sources:Amigo / QuickGO
Orthologs
Databases	NCBI: entry; OMA: entry
Species	Human	Mouse
Entrez	3780	84036
Ensembl	ENSG00000105642	ENSMUSG00000002908
UniProt	Q92952	Q9EQR3
RefSeq (mRNA)	NM_002248	NM_032397
RefSeq (protein)	NP_002239	NP_115773; NP_001350336; NP_001350337
Location (UCSC)	Chr 19: 17.95 – 18 Mb	n/a
PubMed search
- Wikidata
View/Edit Human	View/Edit Mouse

Potassium intermediate/small conductance calcium-activated channel, subfamily N, member 1 , also known as KCNN1, is a human gene encoding the K_{Ca}2.1 protein.

Action potentials in vertebrate neurons are followed by an afterhyperpolarization (AHP) that may persist for several seconds and may have profound consequences for the firing pattern of the neuron. Each component of the AHP is kinetically distinct and is mediated by different calcium-activated potassium channels. The protein encoded by this gene is activated before membrane hyperpolarization and is thought to regulate neuronal excitability by contributing to the slow component of synaptic AHP. The K_{Ca}2.1 protein is an integral membrane protein that forms a voltage-independent calcium-activated channel with three other calmodulin-binding subunits. The KCNN1 gene is a member of the KCNN family of potassium channel genes.

== See also ==
- SK channel
- Voltage-gated potassium channel
