= KCNMB1 =

Protein-coding gene in the species Homo sapiens

Identifiers
- Aliases: KCNMB1, BKbeta1, K(VCA)beta, SLO-BETA, hbeta1, hslo-beta, k(VCA)beta-1, slo-beta-1, potassium calcium-activated channel subfamily M regulatory beta subunit 1
- External IDs: OMIM: 603951; MGI: 1334203; GeneCards: KCNMB1

Gene location (Human)
Chr.	Chromosome 5 (human)
Band	5q35.1	Start	170,374,671 bp
Band	5q35.1	End	170,389,634 bp

Gene location (Mouse)
Chr.	Chromosome 11 (mouse)
Band	11|11 A4	Start	33,913,013 bp
Band	11|11 A4	End	33,923,641 bp
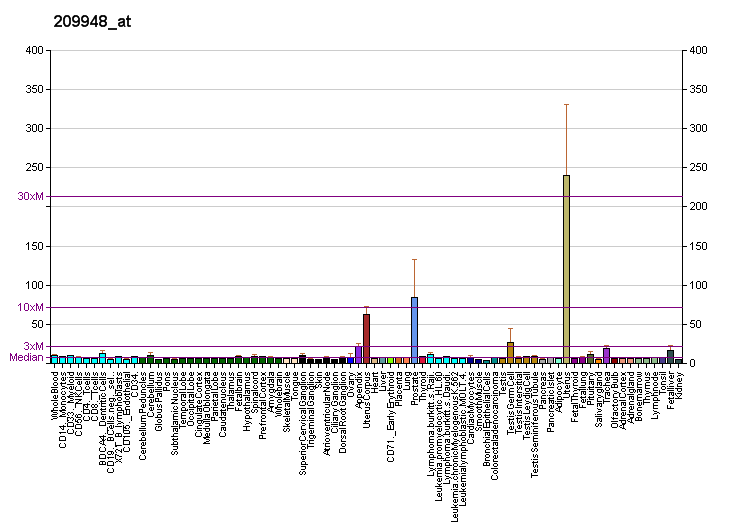
RNA expression pattern
Bgee	Human / Mouse (ortholog); Top expressed in: tail of epididymis; popliteal artery; tibial arteries; right coronary artery; muscle layer of sigmoid colon; seminal vesicula; saphenous vein; thoracic aorta; ascending aorta; Descending thoracic aorta / Top expressed in: lumbar spinal ganglion; ascending aorta; aortic valve; rib; sphenoid bone; Meckel's cartilage; tunica media of zone of aorta; humerus; fibula; scapula; More reference expression data
BioGPS	More reference expression data
Gene ontology
Molecular function	calcium-activated potassium channel activity; potassium channel regulator activity
Cellular component	integral component of membrane; voltage-gated potassium channel complex; plasma membrane; membrane
Biological process	detection of calcium ion; response to calcium ion; potassium ion transport; ion transport; chemical synaptic transmission; ageing; cellular response to hypoxia; cellular response to bile acid; positive regulation of potassium ion transmembrane transport; cellular response to ethanol; potassium ion transmembrane transport
Sources:Amigo / QuickGO
Orthologs
Databases	NCBI: entry; OMA: entry
Species	Human	Mouse
Entrez	3779	16533
Ensembl	ENSG00000145936	ENSMUSG00000020155
UniProt	Q16558	Q8CAE3
RefSeq (mRNA)	NM_004137	NM_031169
RefSeq (protein)	NP_004128	NP_112446
Location (UCSC)	Chr 5: 170.37 – 170.39 Mb	Chr 11: 33.91 – 33.92 Mb
PubMed search
- Wikidata
View/Edit Human	View/Edit Mouse

Calcium-activated potassium channel subunit beta-1 is a protein that in humans is encoded by the KCNMB1 gene.

== Function ==
MaxiK channels are large conductance, voltage and calcium-sensitive potassium channels which are fundamental to the control of smooth muscle tone and neuronal excitability. MaxiK channels can be formed by 2 subunits: the pore-forming alpha subunit and the product of this gene, the modulatory beta subunit. Intracellular calcium regulates the physical association between the alpha and beta subunits. Beta subunits (beta 1-4) are highly tissue specific in their expression, with beta-1 being present predominantly on vascular smooth muscle. Endothelial cells are not known to express beta-1 subunits. Beta-1 is also known to be expressed in urinary bladder and in some regions of the brain. Association of the beta-1 subunit with the BK channel increases the apparent Ca^{2+} sensitivity of the channel and decreases voltage dependence.

== See also ==
- BK channel
- Voltage-gated potassium channel
