= Iberiotoxin =

The amino acid sequence of Iberiotoxin
Pyr - Phe - Thr - Asp - Val - Asp - Cys - Ser - Val - Ser - Lys - Glu - Cys - Trp - Ser - Val - Cys - Lys - Asp - Leu - Phe - Gly - Val - Asp - Arg - Gly - Lys - Cys - Met - Gly - Lys - Lys - Cys - Arg - Cys - Tyr - Gln - OH
Disulfide bridges: Cys7 - Cys28, Cys13 - Cys33, Cys17 - Cys35

Iberiotoxin (IbTX) is an ion channel toxin purified from the Eastern Indian red scorpion Hottentotta tamulus. Iberiotoxin selectively inhibits the current through large-conductance calcium-activated potassium channels.

== Chemistry ==
Iberiotoxin is a 37-amino acid peptide. The formula is C_{179}H_{274}N_{50}O_{55}S_{7}. It is also known as "Potassium channel toxin alpha-KTx 1.3" or IbTx. The complete amino acid sequence has been defined and it displays 68% sequence homology with charybdotoxin.

== Target and mode of action ==
Iberiotoxin binds to the outer face of the large-conductance calcium-activated potassium channels (maxiK or BK channels) with high affinity (Kd ~1 nM). It selectively inhibits the current by decreasing both the probability of opening and the open time of the channel.

== Toxicity ==
The venom produces mainly cardiopulmonary abnormalities like circulatory derangements, myocarditis and changes in cardiac sarcolemmal ATPase and by these abnormalities it can finally cause death. In rural India the scorpion and its venom is a commonly known factor of children's death. The venom initially causes transient cholinergic stimulation (vomiting, profuse sweating, bradycardia, priapism, hypersalivation, and hypotension) which is followed by sustained adrenergic hyperactivity (hypertension, tachycardia, and myocardial failure). The adrenergic phase but not the cholinergic phase is a dose-dependent phenomenon.

== Treatment ==
Treatment is mainly symptomatic. Local pain is treated by injecting dehydroemetine at the site of the sting. Hypovolaemia is corrected by oral rehydration solution. Agitated, confused and non-cooperative patients are given a 5% dextrose saline drip. Patients with hypertension on admission are given a single dose of 5 mg sublingual nifedipine and oral prazosin. The blood pressure in patients with hypertension is controlled with sublingual nifedipine alone. Patients with pulmonary oedema are propped up and given intravenous aminophylline, intravenous sodium bicarbonate, oral prazosin, and oxygen by mask.
