= SK channel =

Protein subfamily of calcium-activated potassium channels

Calcium-activated SK potassium channel
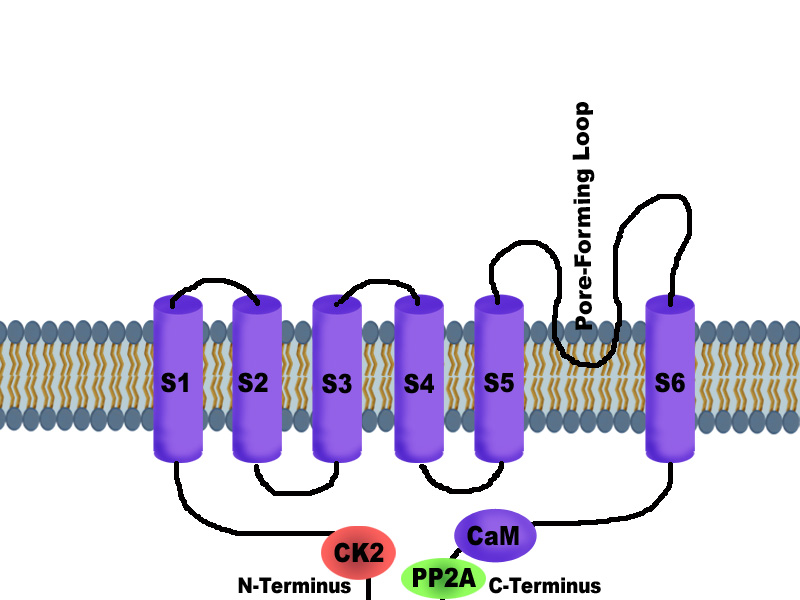
- SK Channel

Identifiers
- Symbol: SK_channel
- Pfam: PF03530
- InterPro: IPR015449
Available protein structures:
- PDB: IPR015449 PF03530 (ECOD; PDBsum)
- AlphaFold: IPR015449; PF03530

SK channels (small conductance calcium-activated potassium channels) are a subfamily of calcium-activated potassium channels. They are so called because of their small single channel conductance in the order of 10 pS. SK channels are a type of ion channel allowing potassium cations to cross the cell membrane and are activated (opened) by an increase in the concentration of intracellular calcium through N-type calcium channels. Their activation limits the firing frequency of action potentials and is important for regulating afterhyperpolarization in the neurons of the central nervous system as well as many other types of electrically excitable cells. This is accomplished through the hyperpolarizing leak of positively charged potassium ions along their concentration gradient into the extracellular space. This hyperpolarization causes the membrane potential to become more negative. SK channels are thought to be involved in synaptic plasticity and therefore play important roles in learning and memory.

== Function ==
SK channels are expressed throughout the central nervous system. They are highly conserved in mammals as well as in other organisms such as Drosophila melanogaster and Caenorhabditis elegans. SK channels are specifically involved in the medium afterhyperpolarizing potential (mAHP). They affect both the intrinsic excitability of neurons and synaptic transmission. They are also involved in calcium signaling. SK channel activation can mediate neuroprotection in various models of cell death. SK channels control action potential discharge frequency in hippocampal neurons, midbrain dopaminergic neurons, dorsal vagal neurons, sympathetic neurons, nucleus reticularis thalamic neurons, inferior olive neurons, spinal and hypoglossal motoneurons, mitral cells in the olfactory bulb, and cortical neurons.

SK channels on dendritic spines in the prefrontal cortex also contribute to a rapid form of neuroplasticity called Dynamic Network Connectivity, where high levels of calcium open SK channels to gate out network inputs and reduce prefrontal cortical neuronal firing, thus coordinating arousal state with cognitive state. This mechanism contributes to the loss of higher cognitive function during stress exposure

== Structure ==
SK potassium channels share the same basic architecture with Shaker-like voltage-gated potassium channels. Four subunits associate to form a tetramer. Each of the subunits has six transmembrane hydrophobic alpha helical domains (S1-S6). A loop between S5 and S6—called the P-loop—provides the pore-forming region that always faces the center of the channel. Each of the subunits has six hydrophobic alpha helical domains that insert into the cell membrane. A loop between the fifth and sixth transmembrane domains forms the potassium ion selectivity filter. SK channels may assemble as homotetrameric channels or as heterotetrameric channels, consisting of more than one SK channel subtype. In addition, SK potassium channels are tightly associated with the protein calmodulin, which accounts for the calcium sensitivity of these channels. Calmodulin participates as a subunit of the channel itself, bound to the cytoplasmic C-terminus region of the peptide called the calmodulin binding domain (CaMBD).

Additional association of the phosphorylating kinase CK2 and dephosphorylating phosphatase PP2A on the cytoplasmic face of the protein allow for enriched Ca^{2+}-sensitivity—and thus—kinetics modulation. CK2 serves to phosphorylate the SKCa-bound CaM at the T80 residue, rather than the channel helices themselves, to reduce calcium sensitivity. This may only be accomplished when the channel pore is closed. PP2A dephosphorylates this residue upon CK2 inhibition. The selectivity filter of all SK channel subtypes—whether SK1, SK2, SK3, or SK4—is highly conserved and reflects the selectivity seen in any potassium channel, a GYGD amino acid residue sequence on the pore-forming loop. These channels are considered to be voltage-independent, as they possess only two of seven positively charged amino acid residues that are typically seen in a prototypical voltage-gated potassium channel.

== Classification ==
The SK channel family contains 4 members – SK1, SK2, SK3, and SK4. SK4 is often referred to as IK (Intermediate conductance) due to its higher conductance 20 – 80 pS.

Channel	Gene	Aliases	Associated subunits
SK1	KCNN1	K_{ca}2.1	calmodulin, PP2A, CK2
SK2	KCNN2	K_{ca}2.2	calmodulin, PP2A, CK2
SK3	KCNN3	K_{ca}2.3	calmodulin, PP2A, CK2
SK4	KCNN4	K_{ca}3.1	calmodulin, PP2A, CK2

== Gating mechanism ==
The SK channel gating mechanism is controlled by intracellular calcium levels. Calcium enters the cell via voltage activated calcium channels as well as through NMDA receptors. Calcium does not directly bind to the SK channel. Even in the absence of calcium, the SK channel binds to the C-lobe of the protein calmodulin (CaM). When the N-lobe binds calcium, it traps the S4-S5 linker on the intracellular subunit of the SK channel. When each of the four S4-S5 linkers are bound to the N-lobe of calmodulin, the SK channel changes conformation. Calmodulin pushes the S4-S5 linker to allow the expansion of the S6 bundle crossing, leading to opening of the pore. The idea that this transitions the channel from a tetramer of monomers to a folded dimer of dimers, which results in rotation of the CaM-binding domains is now abandoned, and the most recent observations are not compatible with the proposal that this rotation causes the mechanical opening of the channel gate. The time constant of SK channel activation is approximately 5 ms. When calcium levels are depleted, the time constant for channel deactivation ranges from 15–60 ms.

== Blockers ==
All SK channels can be pharmacologically blocked by quaternary ammonium salts of a plant-derived neurotoxin bicuculline. In addition, SK channels (SK1-SK3) but not SK4 (IK) are sensitive to blockade by the bee toxin apamin, and the scorpion venoms tamapin and charybdotoxin (ChTx), all via competitive antagonism for access to the mouth of the pore formation. All known blockers compete for roughly the same binding site, the pore, in all subtypes. This provides a physical blockage to the channel pore. Since all blockers are universal to all three types of SK channels, there is an incredibly narrow therapeutic window that does not allow for blocking of a specific SK channel subtype. Quaternary ammonium salts like bicuculline and tetraethylammonium (TEA) enter the pore via the selectivity filter by acting as a potassium mimic in the dehydration step of pore permeation.

The following molecules are other toxins and organic compounds that also inhibit all three small SK channel subtypes to any (even minimal) degree:

- Dequalinium
- d-Tubocurarine
- UCL-1684
- UCL-1848
- Cyproheptadine
- Fluoxetine, the active ingredient in Prozac
- NS8593
- Scyllatoxin (Leiurotoxin-I)
- Lei-Dab7
- N-methyl-laudanosine
- N-Me-bicuculline
- Pancuronium
- Atracurium
- 1-ethyl-1H-benzo[d]imidazol-2(3H)-on
- 6,7-dichloro-3-(hydroxyimino)indolin-2-one
- N-cyclohexyl-2-(3,5-dimethyl-1H-pyrazol-1-yl)-6-methylpyrimidin-4-amine
- (R)-N-(1,2,3,4-tetrahydronaphthalen-1-yl)-1H-benzo[d]imidazol-2-amine

== Modulators ==
Allosteric modulators of small SK channels work by changing the apparent calcium sensitivity of the channels. Examples include:

- Riluzole
- Non-selective positive modulators of SK channels: EBIO (1-Ethyl-2-BenzimIdazolinOne), NS309 (6,7-dichloro-1H-indole-2,3-dione 3-oxime)
- SK-2 and SK-3 selective positive modulators : CyPPA (NS6277; Cyclohexyl-(2-(3,5-dimethyl-Pyrazol-1-yl)-6-methyl-Pyrimidin-4-yl)-Amine)

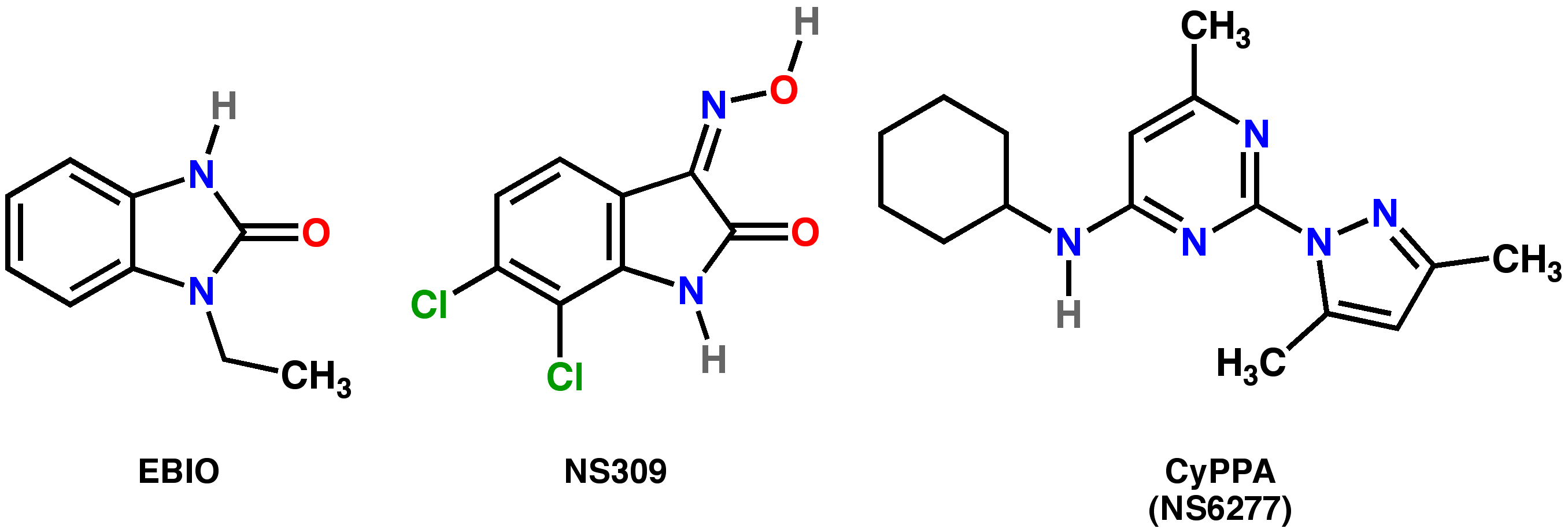
Chemical structure of SK ion channel modulators.

== Synaptic plasticity and long term potentiation ==
In dendritic spines, SK channels are directly coupled to NMDA receptors. In addition to being activated by calcium flow through voltage-gated calcium channels, SK channels can be activated by calcium flowing through NMDA receptors, which occurs after depolarization of the postsynaptic membrane. Experiments using apamin have shown that specifically blocking SK channels can increase learning and long-term potentiation. In addition, brain-derived neurotrophic factor (BDNF) causes the down-regulation of SK channels, which facilitates long-term potentiation. Increasing SK channel activity has the opposite effect and serves to impair learning. An increase in SK channel activity that occurs over time may be related to decreases in plasticity and memory that is seen with aging.

== Role in Parkinson's disease ==
The dysfunction of potassium channels, including SK channels, is thought to play a role in the pathogenesis of Parkinson's disease (PD), a progressive neurodegenerative disorder.

SK channel blockers control the firing rate (the number of action potentials produced by a neuron in a given time) and the firing pattern (the way action potentials are allocated throughout time) through their production of m-AHP. SK channel activators decrease the firing rate, neuron sensitivity to excitatory stimuli, mediating neuroprotection, whereas SK channel blockers increase the firing rate and sensitivity to excitatory stimuli. This has important implications as to the function of dopaminergic neurons. For example, the amount of dopamine released by midbrain dopaminergic neurons is much higher when the frequency of firing increases than when they fire at a constant rate.

SK channels are widely expressed in midbrain dopaminergic neurons. Multiple pharmacological techniques have been used to adjust SK affinity for calcium ions, thereby modulating the excitability of substantia nigra dopaminergic neurons. Blockage of SK channels in vivo increases the firing rate of substantia nigra cells, which increases the amount of dopamine released from the synaptic terminals. When a large amount of dopamine accumulates in the cytosol, cell damage is induced due to the build-up of free radicals and damage to mitochondria. In addition, techniques have been used to modulate SK channels in order to alter the dopamine phenotype of neurons. After the loss of TH+ (tyrosine hydroxylase-positive) substantia nigra compacta (SNc) neurons due to Parkinson’s-induced neurodegeneration, the number of these neurons can partially recover via a cell phenotype "shift" from TH- (tyrosine hydroxylase-negative) to TH+. The number of TH+ neurons can be altered by SK channel modulation; to be specific, the infusion of SK agonists into substantia nigra increases the number of TH+ neurons, whereas the infusion of SK antagonist decreases the number of TH+ neurons. The reason for this relationship between SK channels and TH expression may be due to neuroprotection against dopamine toxicity.

Two contradictory methods have been suggested as therapeutic options for the improvement of PD symptoms:

Inhibition of SK channels

- Inhibition of SK channels, to be specific the blockage of SK3 channels, increases the frequency of firing in dopaminergic neurons, thereby increasing the release of dopamine. It is, therefore, thought that the application of SK3 channels blockers in PD patients may alleviate short-term motor symptoms.
- However, inhibition also results in a decreased number of TH+ substantia nigra compacta (SNc) neurons in the cell, which results in a decrease in dopamine synthesis over the long term.

Facilitation of SK channels

- Enhancing the function of SK channels increases the number of TH+ substantia nigra compacta (SNc) neurons in the cell, thereby maintaining dopamine synthesis over the long term.
- However, the facilitation of SK channels decreases the firing frequency in dopaminergic neurons over the short term.
