= KCNMB3 =

Protein-coding gene in the species Homo sapiens

Identifiers
- Aliases: KCNMB3, BKBETA3, HBETA3, K(VCA)BETA-3, KCNMB2, KCNMBL, SLO-BETA-3, SLOBETA3, potassium calcium-activated channel subfamily M regulatory beta subunit 3
- External IDs: OMIM: 605222; MGI: 3612244; GeneCards: KCNMB3

Gene location (Human)
Chr.	Chromosome 3 (human)
Band	3q26.32	Start	179,236,691 bp
Band	3q26.32	End	179,267,002 bp

Gene location (Mouse)
Chr.	Chromosome 3 (mouse)
Band	3|3 A3	Start	32,525,737 bp
Band	3|3 A3	End	32,546,380 bp
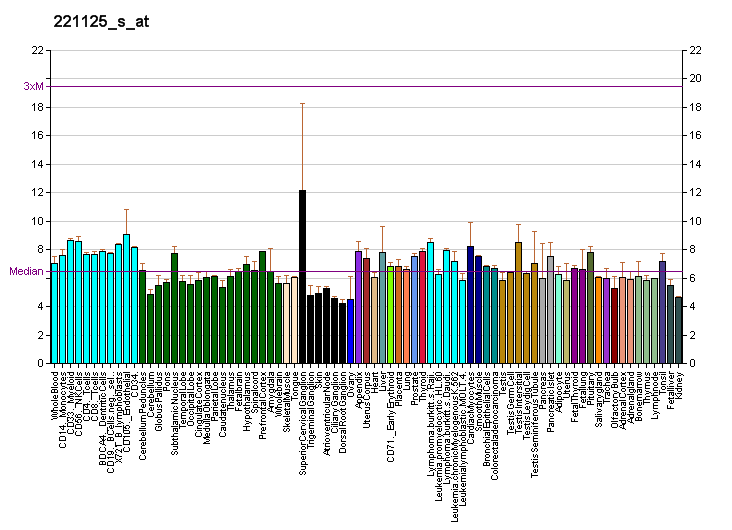
RNA expression pattern
Bgee	Human / Mouse (ortholog); Top expressed in: primary visual cortex; testicle; gonad; body of pancreas; spleen; placenta; sural nerve; apex of heart; subcutaneous adipose tissue; right lobe of liver / Top expressed in: zygote; secondary oocyte; primary oocyte; embryo; adrenal gland; hypothalamus; blastocyst; proximal tubule; striatum of neuraxis; spermatocyte; More reference expression data
BioGPS	More reference expression data
Gene ontology
Molecular function	calcium-activated potassium channel activity; potassium channel regulator activity
Cellular component	integral component of membrane; voltage-gated potassium channel complex; plasma membrane; integral component of plasma membrane; membrane
Biological process	detection of calcium ion; action potential; ion transport; neuronal action potential; potassium ion transport; potassium ion transmembrane transport; chemical synaptic transmission
Sources:Amigo / QuickGO
Orthologs
Databases	NCBI: entry; OMA: entry
Species	Human	Mouse
Entrez	27094	100502876
Ensembl	ENSG00000171121	ENSMUSG00000091091
UniProt	Q9NPA1	E9Q7U0
RefSeq (mRNA)	NM_001163677; NM_014407; NM_171828; NM_171829; NM_171830	NM_001195074
RefSeq (protein)	NP_001157149; NP_055222; NP_741979; NP_741980; NP_741981	NP_001182003
Location (UCSC)	Chr 3: 179.24 – 179.27 Mb	Chr 3: 32.53 – 32.55 Mb
PubMed search
- Wikidata
View/Edit Human	View/Edit Mouse

Calcium-activated potassium channel subunit beta-3 is a protein that in humans is encoded by the KCNMB3 gene.

MaxiK channels are large conductance, voltage and calcium-sensitive potassium channels which are fundamental to the control of smooth muscle tone and neuronal excitability. MaxiK channels can be formed by 2 subunits: the pore-forming alpha subunit and the modulatory beta subunit. The protein encoded by this gene is an auxiliary beta subunit which may partially inactivate or slightly decrease the activation time of MaxiK alpha subunit currents. At least four transcript variants encoding four different isoforms have been found for this gene.

== See also ==
- BK channel
- Voltage-gated potassium channel
