= KCNMB4 =

Protein-coding gene in humans

Identifiers
- Aliases: KCNMB4, potassium calcium-activated channel subfamily M regulatory beta subunit 4
- External IDs: OMIM: 605223; MGI: 1913272; GeneCards: KCNMB4

Gene location (Human)
Chr.	Chromosome 12 (human)
Band	12q15	Start	70,366,290 bp
Band	12q15	End	70,434,292 bp

Gene location (Mouse)
Chr.	Chromosome 10 (mouse)
Band	10|10 D2	Start	116,253,766 bp
Band	10|10 D2	End	116,309,783 bp
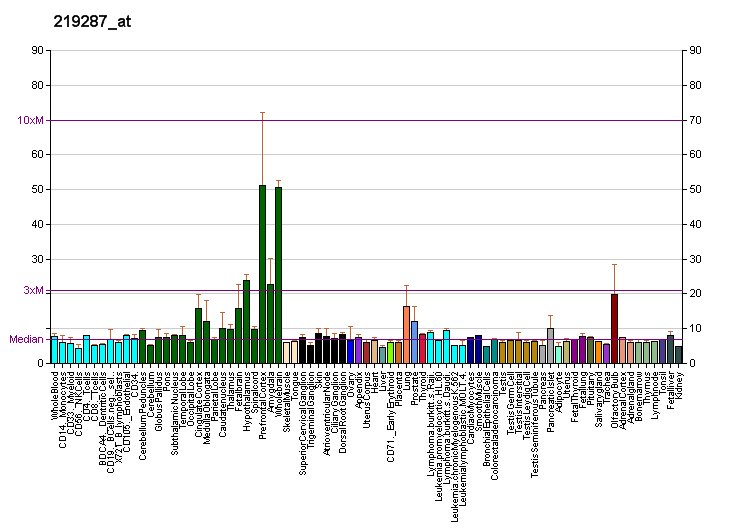
RNA expression pattern
Bgee	Human / Mouse (ortholog); Top expressed in: endothelial cell; postcentral gyrus; entorhinal cortex; hippocampus proper; corpus callosum; superior frontal gyrus; middle temporal gyrus; lateral nuclear group of thalamus; external globus pallidus; prefrontal cortex / Top expressed in: primary motor cortex; lobe of cerebellum; cingulate gyrus; facial motor nucleus; cerebellar vermis; globus pallidus; medial dorsal nucleus; spermatocyte; prefrontal cortex; habenula; More reference expression data
BioGPS	More reference expression data
Gene ontology
Molecular function	protein binding; calcium-activated potassium channel activity; potassium channel regulator activity
Cellular component	integral component of membrane; integral component of plasma membrane; plasma membrane; voltage-gated potassium channel complex; membrane
Biological process	ion transport; action potential; neuronal action potential; regulation of vasoconstriction; chemical synaptic transmission; detection of calcium ion; potassium ion transport; regulation of neurotransmitter secretion; potassium ion transmembrane transport
Sources:Amigo / QuickGO
Orthologs
Databases	NCBI: entry; OMA: entry
Species	Human	Mouse
Entrez	27345	58802
Ensembl	ENSG00000135643	ENSMUSG00000054934
UniProt	Q86W47	Q9JIN6
RefSeq (mRNA)	NM_014505	NM_021452
RefSeq (protein)	NP_055320	NP_067427
Location (UCSC)	Chr 12: 70.37 – 70.43 Mb	Chr 10: 116.25 – 116.31 Mb
PubMed search
- Wikidata
View/Edit Human	View/Edit Mouse

Calcium-activated potassium channel subunit beta-4 is a protein that in humans is encoded by the KCNMB4 gene.

MaxiK channels are large conductance, voltage and calcium-sensitive potassium channels which are fundamental to the control of smooth muscle tone and neuronal excitability. MaxiK channels can be formed by 2 subunits: the pore-forming alpha subunit and the modulatory beta subunit. The protein encoded by this gene is an auxiliary beta subunit which slows activation kinetics, leads to steeper calcium sensitivity, and shifts the voltage range of current activation to more negative potentials than does the beta 1 subunit.

== See also ==
- BK channel
- Voltage-gated potassium channel
