= BK channel =

Family of transport proteins

KCNMA1
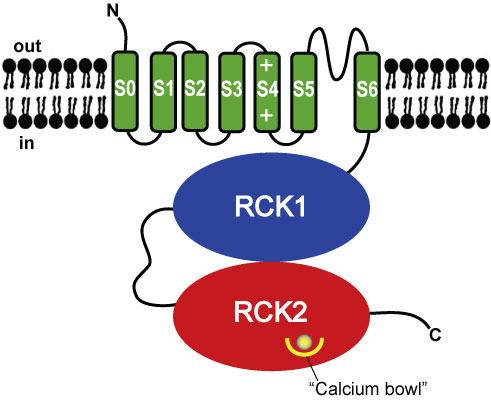
- The domain structure of BK channels

Identifiers
- Symbol: KCNMA1
- Alt. symbols: SLO
- NCBI gene: 3778
- HGNC: 6284
- OMIM: 600150
- RefSeq: NM_002247
- UniProt: Q12791

Other data
- Locus: Chr. 10 q22
Search for
- Structures: Swiss-model
- Domains: InterPro

KCNMB1

Identifiers
- Symbol: KCNMB1
- NCBI gene: 3779
- HGNC: 6285
- OMIM: 603951
- RefSeq: NM_004137
- UniProt: Q16558

Other data
- Locus: Chr. 5 q34
Search for
- Structures: Swiss-model
- Domains: InterPro

KCNMB2

Identifiers
- Symbol: KCNMB2
- NCBI gene: 10242
- HGNC: 6286
- OMIM: 605214
- RefSeq: NM_181361
- UniProt: Q9Y691

Other data
- Locus: Chr. 3 q26.32
Search for
- Structures: Swiss-model
- Domains: InterPro

KCNMB3

Identifiers
- Symbol: KCNMB3
- Alt. symbols: KCNMB2, KCNMBL
- NCBI gene: 27094
- HGNC: 6287
- OMIM: 605222
- RefSeq: NM_171828
- UniProt: Q9NPA1

Other data
- Locus: Chr. 3 q26.3-q27
Search for
- Structures: Swiss-model
- Domains: InterPro

KCNMB3L

Identifiers
- Symbol: KCNMB3L
- Alt. symbols: KCNMB2L, KCNMBLP
- NCBI gene: 27093
- HGNC: 6288
- RefSeq: NG_002679

Other data
- Locus: Chr. 22 q11.1

KCNMB4

Identifiers
- Symbol: KCNMB4
- NCBI gene: 27345
- HGNC: 6289
- OMIM: 605223
- RefSeq: NM_014505
- UniProt: Q86W47

Other data
- Locus: Chr. 12 q15
Search for
- Structures: Swiss-model
- Domains: InterPro

Calcium-activated BK potassium channel alpha subunit

Identifiers
- Symbol: BK_channel_a
- Pfam: PF03493
- InterPro: IPR003929
Available protein structures:
- PDB: IPR003929 PF03493 (ECOD; PDBsum)
- AlphaFold: IPR003929; PF03493

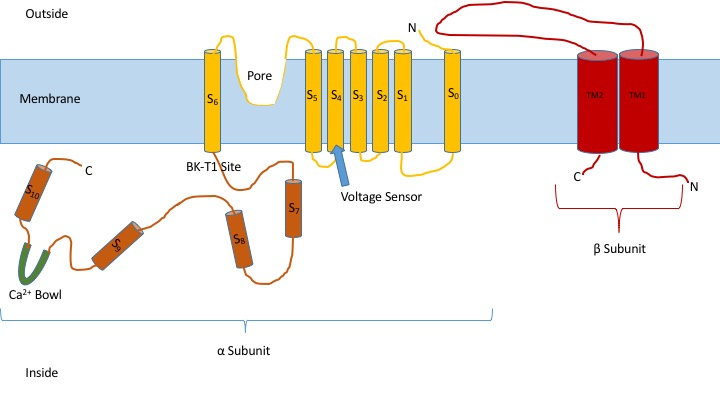
BK Channel Structure

BK channels (big potassium), are large conductance calcium-activated potassium channels, and is also known as BKCa, Maxi-K, slo1, or K_{Ca}1.1. BK channels are voltage-gated potassium channels that conduct large amounts of potassium ions (K^{+}) across the cell membrane, hence their name, big potassium. These channels can be activated (opened) by either electrical means, or by increasing Ca^{2+} concentrations in the cell. BK channels help regulate physiological processes, such as circadian behavioral rhythms and neuronal excitability. BK channels are also involved in many processes in the body, as it is a ubiquitous channel. They have a tetrameric structure that is composed of a transmembrane domain, voltage sensing domain, potassium channel domain, and a cytoplasmic C-terminal domain, with many X-ray structures for reference. Their function is to repolarize the membrane potential by allowing for potassium to flow outward, in response to a depolarization or increase in calcium levels.

== Structure ==
Structurally, BK channels are homologous to voltage- and ligand-gated potassium channels, having a voltage sensor and pore as the membrane-spanning domain and a cytosolic domain for the binding of intracellular calcium and magnesium. Each monomer of the channel-forming alpha subunit is the product of the KCNMA1 gene (also known as Slo1). The Slo1 subunit has three main structural domains, each with a distinct function:

- The voltage sensing domain (VSD) senses membrane potential across the membrane,
- The cytosolic domain (senses calcium concentration, Ca^{2+} ions), and
- The pore-gate domain (PGD) which opens and closes to regulate potassium permeation.

The activation gate resides in the PGD, which is located at either the cytosolic side of S6 or the selectivity filter (selectivity is the preference of a channel to conduct a specific ion). The voltage sensing domain and pore-gated domain are collectively referred to as the membrane-spanning domains and are formed by transmembrane segments S1-S4 and S5-S6, respectively. Within the S4 helix contains a series of positively charged residues which serve as the primary voltage sensor.

BK channels are quite similar to voltage gated K⁺ channels. However, in BK channels only one positively charged residue (Arg213) is involved in voltage sensing across the membrane. Also unique to BK channels is an additional S0 segment, this segment is required for β subunit modulation. and voltage sensitivity.

The Cytosolic domain is composed of two RCK (regulator of potassium conductance) domains, RCK1 and RCK2. These domains contain two high affinity Ca^{2+} binding sites:

- One in the RCK1 domain.
- One in a region termed the Ca^{2+} bowl that consists of a series of Aspartic acid (Asp) residues that are located in the RCK2 domain.

The Mg^{2+} binding site is located between the VSD and the cytosolic domain, which is formed by: Asp residues within the S0-S1 loop, Asparagine residues in the cytosolic end of S2, and Glutamine residues in RCK1. In forming the Mg^{2+} binding site, two residues come from the RCK1 of one Slo1 subunit and the other two residues come from the VSD of the neighboring subunit. In order for these residues to coordinate the Mg^{2+} ion, the VSD and cytosolic domain from neighboring subunits must be in close proximity. Modulatory beta subunits (encoded by KCNMB1, KCNMB2, KCNMB3, or KCNMB4) can associate with the tetrameric channel. There are four types of β subunits (β1-4), each of which have different expression patterns that modify the gating properties of the BK channel. The β1 subunit is primarily responsible for smooth muscle cell expression, both β2 and β3 subunits are neuronally expressed, while β4 is expressed within the brain. The VSD associates with the PGD via three major interactions:

1. Physical connection between the VSD and PGD through the S4-S5 linker.
2. Interactions between the S4-S5 linker and the cytosolic side of S6.
3. Interactions between S4 and S5 of a neighboring subunit.

== Regulation ==
BK channels are associated and modulated by a wide variety of intra- and extracellular factors, such as auxiliary subunits (β, γ), Slobs (slo binding protein), phosphorylation, membrane voltage, chemical ligands (Ca^{2+}, Mg^{2+}), PKC, The BK α-subunits assemble 1:1 with four different auxiliary types of β-subunits (β1, β2, β3 or β4).

Trafficking to and expression of BK channels in the plasma membrane has been found to be regulated by distinct splicing motifs located within the intracellular C-terminal RCK domains. In particular, a splice variant that excluded these motifs prevented cell surface expression of BK channels and suggests that such a mechanism impacts physiology and pathophysiology.

BK channels in the vascular system are modulated by agents naturally produced in the body, such as angiotensin II (Ang II), high glucose or arachidonic acid (AA) which is modulated in diabetes by oxidative stress (ROS).

A weaker voltage sensitivity allows BK channels to function in a wide range of membrane potentials. This ensures that the channel can properly perform its physiological function.

Inhibition of BK channel activity by phosphorylation of S695 by protein kinase C (PKC) is dependent on the phosphorylation of S1151 in C terminus of channel alpha-subunit. Only one of these phosphorylations in the tetrameric structure needs to occur for inhibition to be successful. Protein phosphatase 1 counteracts phosphorylation of S695. PKC decreases channel opening probability by shortening the channel open time and prolonging the closed state of the channel. PKC does not affect the single-channel conductance, voltage dependence, or the calcium sensitivity of BK channels.

== Activation mechanism ==
BK channels are synergistically activated through the binding of calcium and magnesium ions, but can also be activated via voltage dependence. Ca^{2+} - dependent activation occurs when intracellular Ca^{2+} binds to two high affinity binding sites: one located in the C-terminus of the RCK2 domain (Ca^{2+} bowl), and the other located in the RCK1 domain. The binding site within the RCK1 domain has somewhat of a lower affinity for calcium than the Ca^{2+} bowl, but is responsible for a larger portion of the Ca^{2+} sensitivity. Voltage and calcium activate BK channels using two parallel mechanisms, with the voltage sensors and the Ca^{2+} bindings sites coupling to the activation gate independently, except for a weak interaction between the two mechanisms. The Ca^{2+} bowl accelerates activation kinetics at low Ca^{2+} concentrations while RCK1 site influences both activation and deactivation kinetics. One mechanism model was originally proposed by Monod, Wyman, and Changeux, known as the MWC model. The MWC model for BK channels explains that a conformational change of the activation gate in channel opening is accompanied by a conformational change to the Ca^{2+} binding site, which increases the affinity of Ca^{2+} binding.

Magnesium-dependent activation of BK channels activates via a low-affinity metal binding site that is independent from Ca^{2+}-dependent activation. The Mg^{2+} sensor activates BK channels by shifting the activation voltage to a more negative range. Mg^{2+} activates the channel only when the voltage sensor domain stays in the activated state. The cytosolic tail domain (CTD) is a chemical sensor that has multiple binding sites for different ligands. The CTD activates the BK channel when bound with intracellular Mg^{2+} to allow for interaction with the voltage sensor domain (VSD). Magnesium is predominantly coordinated by six oxygen atoms from the side chains of oxygen-containing residues, main chain carbonyl groups in proteins, or water molecules. D99 at the C-terminus of the S0-S1 loop and N172 in the S2-S3 loop contain side chain oxygens in the voltage sensor domain that are essential for Mg^{2+} binding. Much like the Ca^{2+}-dependent activation model, Mg^{2+}-dependent activation can also be described by an allosteric MCW gating model. While calcium activates the channel largely independent of the voltage sensor, magnesium activates the channel by an electrostatic interaction with the voltage sensor. This is also known as the Nudging model, in which Magnesium activates the channel by pushing the voltage sensor via electrostatic interactions and involves the interactions among side chains in different structural domains. Energy provided by voltage, Ca^{2+}, and Mg^{2+} binding will propagate to the activation gate of BK channels to initiate ion conduction through the pore.

== Effects on the neuron, organ, body as a whole ==
=== Cellular level ===
BK channels help regulate both the firing of neurons and neurotransmitter release. This modulation of synaptic transmission and electrical discharge at the cellular level is due to BK channel expression in conjunction with other potassium-calcium channels. The opening of these channels causes a drive towards the potassium equilibrium potential and thus play a role in speeding up the repolarization of action potentials. This would effectively allow for more rapid stimulation. There is also a role played in shaping the general repolarization of cells, and thus after hyperpolarization (AHP) of action potentials. The role that BK channels have in the fast phase of AHP has been studied extensively in the hippocampus. It can also play a role in inhibiting the release of neurotransmitters. There are many BK channels in Purkinje cells in the cerebellum, thus highlighting their role in motor coordination and function. Furthermore, BK channels play a role in modulating the activity of dendrites as well as astrocytes and microglia. They not only play a role in the CNS (central nervous system) but also in smooth muscle contractions, the secretion of endocrine cells, and the proliferation of cells. Various γ subunits during early brain development are involved in neuronal excitability and in non-excitable cells they often are responsible as a driving force of calcium. Therefore, these subunits can be targets for therapeutic treatments as BK channel activators. There is further evidence that inhibiting BK channels would prevent the efflux of potassium and thus reduce the usage of ATP, in effect allowing for neuronal survival in low oxygen environments. BK channels can also function as a neuronal protectant in terms such as limiting calcium entry into the cells through methionine oxidation.

=== Organ level ===
BK channels also play a role in hearing. This was found when the BK ɑ-subunit was knocked out in mice and progressive loss of cochlear hair cells, and thus hearing loss, was observed. BK channels are not only involved in hearing, but also circadian rhythms. Slo binding proteins (Slobs) can modulate BK channels as a function of circadian rhythms in neurons. BK channels are expressed in the suprachiasmatic nucleus (SCN), which is characterized to influence the pathophysiology of sleep. BK channel openers can also have a protective effect on the cardiovascular system. At a low concentration of calcium BK channels have a greater impact on vascular tone. Furthermore, the signaling system of BK channels in the cardiovascular system have an influence on the functioning of coronary blood flow. One of the functions of the β subunit in the brain includes inhibition of the BK channels, allowing for the slowing of channel properties as well as the ability to aid in prevention of seizures in the temporal lobe.

=== Bodily function level ===
Mutations of BK channels, resulting in a lower amount of expression in mRNA, is more common in people who have mental disabilities (via hypofunction), schizophrenia or autism. Moreover, increased repolarization caused by BK channel mutations may lead to dependency of alcohol, initiation of dyskinesias, epilepsy, or paroxysmal movement disorders. Not only are BK channels important in many cellular processes in the adult it also is crucial for proper nutrition supply to a developing fetus. Thus, estrogen can cause an increase in the density of BK channels in the uterus. However, increased expression of BK channels have been found in tumor cells, and this could influence future cancer therapy, discussed more in the pharmacology section. BK channels are ubiquitous throughout the body and thus have a large and vast impact on the body as a whole and at a more cellular level, as discussed.

== Pharmacology ==
=== Potential issues ===
Several issues arise when there is a deficit in BK channels. Consequences of the malfunctioning BK channel can affect the functioning of a person in many ways, some more life-threatening than others. BK channels can be activated by exogenous pollutants and endogenous gasotransmitters carbon monoxide, nitric oxide, and hydrogen sulphide. Mutations in the proteins involved with BK channels or genes encoding BK channels are involved in many diseases. A malfunction of BK channels can proliferate in many disorders such as: epilepsy, cancer, diabetes, asthma, and hypertension. Specifically, β1 defect can increase blood pressure and hydrosaline retention in the kidney. Both loss of function and gain of function mutations have been found to be involved in disorders such as epilepsy and chronic pain. Furthermore, increases in BK channel activation, through gain-of-function mutants and amplification, has links to epilepsy and cancer. Moreover, BK channels play a role in tumors as well as cancers. In certain cancers gBK, a variant ion channel called glioma BK channel, can be found. It is known that BK channels do in some way influence the division of cells during replication, which when unregulated can lead to cancers and tumors. Moreover, an aspect studied includes the migration of cancer cells and the role in which BK channels can facilitate this migration, though much is still unknown. Another reason why BK channel understanding is important involves its role in organ transplant surgery. This is due to the activation of BK channels influencing repolarization of the resting membrane potential. Thus, understanding is crucial for safety in effective transplantation.

=== Current developments ===
BK channels can be used as pharmacological targets for the treatment of several medical disorders including stroke and overactive bladder. There have been attempts to develop synthetic molecules targeting BK channels, however their efforts have proven largely ineffective thus far. For instance, BMS-204352, a molecule developed by Bristol Myers Squibb, failed to improve clinical outcome in stroke patients compared to placebo. However, there have been some success from the agonist to BKCa channels, BMS-204352, in treating deficits observed in Fmr1 knockout mice, a model of Fragile X syndrome. BK channels also function as a blocker in ischemia and are a focus in investigating its use as a therapy for stroke.

=== Future directions ===
There are many applications for therapeutic strategies involving BK channels. There has been research displaying that a blockage of BK channels results in an increase in neurotransmitter release, effectively indicating future therapeutic possibilities in cognition enhancement, improved memory, and relieving depression. A behavioral response to alcohol is also modulated by BK channels, therefore further understanding of this relationship can aid treatment in patients who are alcoholics. Oxidative stress on BK channels can lead to the negative impairments of lowering blood pressure through cardiovascular relaxation have on both aging and disease. Thus, the signaling system can be involved in treating hypertension and atherosclerosis through targeting of the ɑ subunit to prevent these detrimental effects. Furthermore, the known role that BK channels can play in cancer and tumors is limited. Thus, there is not a lot of current knowledge regarding specific aspects of BK channels that can influence tumors and cancers. Further study is crucial, as this could lead to immense development in treatments for those with cancer and tumors. It is known that epilepsies are due to over-excitability of neurons, which BK channels have a large impact on controlling hyperexcitability. Therefore, understanding could influence the treatment of epilepsy. Overall, BK channels are a target for future pharmacological agents that can be used for benevolent treatments of disease.

== Ligands ==
=== Channel openers ===
- 17β-Estradiol (endogenous channel opener)
- Andolast
- Chlorzoxazone
- KER‑0193
- Flindokalner
- Riluzole (among several other targets)
- Rottlerin
- Tamoxifen and metabolites such as 4-hydroxytamoxifen
- NS8
- NS1619
- NS11021
- TA1702
- VSN16R (SPG601)

=== Channel blockers ===
- A-272651
- Charybdotoxin (non selective)
- Iberiotoxin (highly selective, reference BK channel blocker used in research)
- ENA-001
- Paxilline
- Tetrandrine

== See also ==
- Calcium-activated potassium channel subunit alpha-1
- Calcium-activated potassium channel
- Voltage-gated potassium channel
