= Ssm spooky toxin =

Centipede toxin

Spooky toxin, Mu-scoloptoxin(15)-Ssm1a, Mu-SLPTX(15)-Ssm1a, Potassium channel toxin SsTx
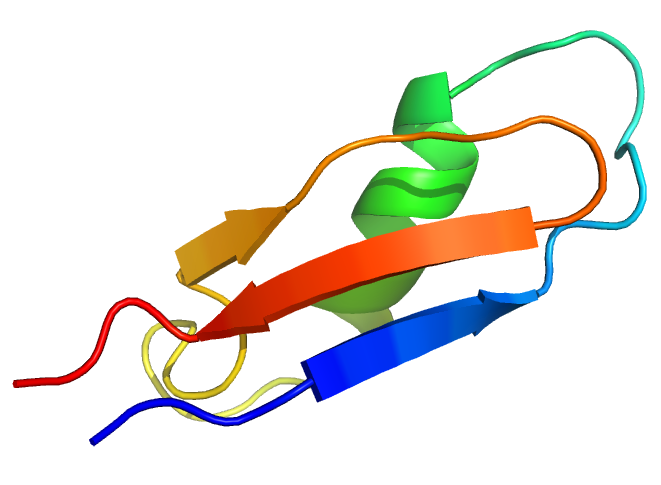
- 3D structure of spooky toxin

Identifiers
- Organism: Scolopendra subspinipes mutilans
- Symbol: SsTx
- Orthologs: OMA: entry
- PDB: 5X0S
- UniProt: A0A2L0ART2
Search for
- Structures: Swiss-model
- Domains: InterPro

Ssm Spooky toxin (SsTx), also known as Mu-scoloptoxin(15)-Ssm1a, is a small protein toxin and ion channel toxin identified in the venom of the Chinese red-headed centipede, Scolopendra subspinipes mutilans. The toxin is synthesized as a 76–amino acid precursor that is processed into a mature 53-amino acid peptide, which is secreted as the active component. Its primary sequence shows no significant similarity to previously characterized animal toxins. SsTx selectively targets voltage-gated potassium channels, including the centipede shal subtype, and contributes to both intraspecific deterrence and prey immobilization.

== Discovery ==
SsTx was identified in 2018 during systematic proteomic and transcriptomic analyses of venom from S. mutilans. The toxin was designated “Ssm Spooky Toxin” (SsTx), with “Ssm” derived from the species name Scolopendra subspinipes mutilans.

== Structure ==
SsTx belongs to the scoloptoxin-15 family and is a 53 amino acid peptide with a molecular mass of 6017.5 Da. The primary sequence of SsTx was obtained by Edman degradation, a purification process where one amino acid residue is removed and identified. An initial 76 amino acid peptide undergoes post-translational modification whereby a 23 amino acid sequence is cleaved off, resulting in a final 53 amino acid peptide: EVIKKDTPYKKRKFPYKSECLKACATSFTGGDESRIQEGKPFGFKCTCYFTTG. Two disulfide bridges are present at Cys20-46 and Cys24-48, resulting in a 2ds-CSalpha/beta confirmation where an alpha-helix is connected to a beta-sheet. This makes the structure compact and rigid, and provides chemical, thermal, and biological stability, while the C-terminal domain of the toxin is relatively flexible. The 3D structure is similar to U-SLPTX15-Sm2a, another centipede peptide.

== Reactivity ==
SsTx targets voltage-gated potassium channels, including the centipede shal subtype and KCNQ channels, producing cardiovascular, neurological, and respiratory effects in prey and conspecifics. In S. mutilans, resistance to SsTx is conferred by a splice variant of KCNQ1 expressed in the venom gland, which contains eleven mutated residues and a partially buried binding site, preventing effective toxin binding. Pharmacologically, KCNQ openers such as retigabine have been shown to neutralize the cardiovascular, nervous, and respiratory effects of SsTx. Retigabine reduces vessel toxicity, reverses hypertension, prevents myocardial ischemia (in Macaca monkeys), inhibits neuronal spiking frequency, acetylcholine secretion, and seizures (in mice), and decreases bronchial ring contraction, all of which are outcomes of SsTx.

== Synthesis ==
SsTx is a naturally occurring toxin that can be isolated from the centipede's crude venom. It is one of the most abundantly found toxins found in Chinese red-headed centipedes, with one bite injecting 15-30 µL of crude venom, which contains more than 0.01 mg of SsTx per 10 µL.

SsTx has been synthesized in the laboratory using automatic peptide synthesizers employing the Fmoc (9-fluorenyl methoxycarbonyl) solid-phase synthesis strategy. First, a linear amino acid chain, using HOBt/TBTU/NMM coupling, is created. The purity of the linear SsTx is determined to be >95% by MALDI-TOF MS and HPLC. Finally, refolding or oxidation is done to achieve the biologically active structure with correct disulfide bonds, done by dissolving in a buffer of Tris-HCl and NaCl containing glutathione.

== Biotransformation ==
SsTx is synthesized as a precursor polypeptide that undergoes post-translational cleavage to yield a biologically active toxin. Transcriptomic analysis of the venom glands of S. mutilans revealed that SsTx initially has a length of 76 amino acids. Maturation of such peptides usually occurs at a processing motif, indicating a cleavage site, recognised by protein convertases. These processing motifs commonly consist of paired basic residues such as Lys-Arg or Arg-Arg, which are characteristic of secreted toxin precursors. Although the exact cleavage protein has not yet been identified, amino acid sequence analysis indicates the presence of such motifs, consistent with activation in the secretory pathway.

Following the proteolytic cleavage, SsTx undergoes oxidative folding to promote the peptide's stability. Two intramolecular disulfide bridges are formed (Cys20-Cys46, Cys24-Cys48). The formation of these disulfide bridges occurs in the oxidising environment of the endoplasmic reticulum, and is essential to achieve the toxin's correct 3D tertiary structure. Nuclear Magnetic Resonance (NMR) analysis confirms that these disulfide bonds add to the stability of the peptide by creating a stable fold consisting of an alpha-helix connected to a beta-sheet. The formation of proper disulfide bonds is essential for the toxin's characteristic high affinity for binding to potassium channels. Lastly, the mature toxin is transported through the Golgi apparatus, where it is packaged into secretory vesicles.

== Molecular mechanism of action ==
SsTx inhibits all KCNQ subtypes (K_{V}7.1, K_{V}7.2, K_{V}7.4, and K_{V}7.5) but it has also been found to inhibit K_{V}1.3 (and the Drosophila homolog shaker), K_{V}2.1 (KCNB1) and K_{V}4 (and its Drosophila homolog shal). The surface of the peptide features distinct positively charged areas that dictate its interaction with specific ion channels. Centipedes use different areas of their SsTx to target different channels and thus outcomes, meaning that SsTx is lethal to heterospecific prey but only momentarily paralysing for conspecific centipedes. In heterospecific species, the specific amino acids arginine 12 (R12) and lysine 13 (K13), make the surface of the peptide positively charged, which is critical for the toxin's ability to bind and inhibit KCNQ (K_{V}7) channels in prey. K13 binds the peptide to the D266 residue of the outer pore of KCNQ, and R12 extends into the selectivity filter, binding to the D288 residue of the P loop region. Substitution of these two SsTx amino acids with alanine increases the IC_{50} from 2.5 μM to 104.7 μM (substitution of arginine) and 117.5 μM (lysine), meaning KCNQ inhibition significantly decreases.

In conspecifics, SsTx is highly selective for the shal (centipede K_{V} channel subtypes) channel and inhibits shal-mediated potassium currents with an affinity, IC_{50}, between 0.1 and 0.3 M.

The reactivity is driven by interactions between positively lysine 17 (K17) on SsTx and negatively charged glutamate 351 (E351) on the outer pore of the shal channel. This allows for the formation of strong salt bridges, whose coupling energy is 1.9 ± 0.1 kT obtained from thermodynamic mutant cycle analysis, indicating a direct specific interaction. This interaction allows the centipede to block the conspecific centipedes’ shal channels with high affinity and sensitivity, causing temporary paralysis. Orthologs do not respond to the toxin at lower concentrations due to lack of specific E351. Conspecific species also contain a positively charged arginine on position 399 (R399) of the shaker channel that repulses the toxin, an evolutionary adaptation that provides resistance to the toxin, benefiting the species’ overall survival.

== Toxicity ==
The SsTx causes toxicity in multiple important physiological pathways by binding to the KCNQ channels. The affected pathways are the cardiovascular system, the respiratory system and the nervous system. SsTx has an LD_{50} of 0.85 mg/kg and an elimination half life of 4.5 hours in mice.^{[1]} S. mutilans (~3 g) can subdue a mouse (~45 g) within 30 seconds. Cardiovascular symptoms include hypertension, myocardial ischemia, vasospasm, and twitching. These effects are attributed to the vasoconstriction of various blood vessels including the coronary artery. Respiratory symptoms include a reduced respiratory rate accompanied by increased respiratory amplitude, resulting from constriction of the bronchial rings. Neurological symptoms, including seizures, have been reported following centipede envenomation. Although SsTx does not cross the blood-brain barrier, such symptoms have been observed in affected patients.

The toxicity is the result of SsTx binding to the outer pore domain of the KCNQ channels and blocking the flow of potassium. The blockage of the channel becomes progressively less when the membrane potential of the affected cell becomes more polarised, and the IC_{50} becomes higher with an increased potassium concentration. SsTx binds with a slightly different IC_{50}for the different subtypes of KCNQ channels. It has an IC_{50}of 2.8 ± 0.5 µM for KCNQ1, 2.7 ± 0.4 µM for KCNQ2, 2.5 ± 0.4 µM for KCNQ4, and 2.7 ± 0.5 µM for KCNQ5.
