= KCNE4 =

Protein-coding gene in the species Homo sapiens

Identifiers
- Aliases: KCNE4, MIRP3, potassium voltage-gated channel subfamily E regulatory subunit 4
- External IDs: OMIM: 607775; MGI: 1891125; GeneCards: KCNE4

Gene location (Human)
Chr.	Chromosome 2 (human)
Band	2q36.1	Start	223,052,190 bp
Band	2q36.1	End	223,198,399 bp

Gene location (Mouse)
Chr.	Chromosome 1 (mouse)
Band	1|1 C4	Start	78,794,475 bp
Band	1|1 C4	End	78,797,745 bp
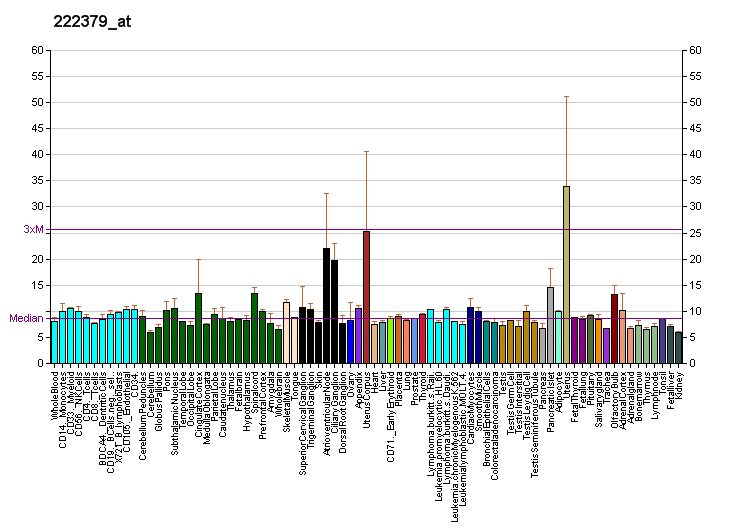
RNA expression pattern
Bgee	Human / Mouse (ortholog); Top expressed in: saphenous vein; gallbladder; tibial arteries; pericardium; smooth muscle tissue; Achilles tendon; myometrium; islet of Langerhans; testicle; ascending aorta / Top expressed in: ascending aorta; aortic valve; calvaria; efferent ductule; dermis; tunica media of zone of aorta; condyle; carotid body; uterus; vas deferens; More reference expression data
BioGPS	More reference expression data
Gene ontology
Molecular function	protein binding; voltage-gated ion channel activity; transmembrane transporter binding; voltage-gated potassium channel activity; potassium channel activity; delayed rectifier potassium channel activity; potassium channel regulator activity; voltage-gated potassium channel activity involved in ventricular cardiac muscle cell action potential repolarization
Cellular component	apical plasma membrane; membrane; integral component of membrane; voltage-gated potassium channel complex
Biological process	ion transport; potassium ion transmembrane transport; potassium ion transport; regulation of ion transmembrane transport; regulation of ventricular cardiac muscle cell membrane repolarization; ventricular cardiac muscle cell action potential; membrane repolarization during action potential; regulation of heart rate by cardiac conduction; membrane repolarization during ventricular cardiac muscle cell action potential; negative regulation of delayed rectifier potassium channel activity; potassium ion export across plasma membrane
Sources:Amigo / QuickGO
Orthologs
Databases	NCBI: entry; OMA: entry
Species	Human	Mouse
Entrez	23704	57814
Ensembl	ENSG00000152049	ENSMUSG00000047330
UniProt	Q8WWG9	Q9WTW3
RefSeq (mRNA)	NM_080671	NM_021342
RefSeq (protein)	NP_542402	NP_067317
Location (UCSC)	Chr 2: 223.05 – 223.2 Mb	Chr 1: 78.79 – 78.8 Mb
PubMed search
- Wikidata
View/Edit Human	View/Edit Mouse

Potassium voltage-gated channel subfamily E member 4, originally named MinK-related peptide 3 or MiRP3 when it was discovered, is a protein that in humans is encoded by the KCNE4 gene.

== Function ==
Voltage-gated potassium channels (K_{v}) represent the most complex class of voltage-gated ion channels from both functional and structural standpoints. Their diverse functions include regulating neurotransmitter release, heart rate, insulin secretion, neuronal excitability, epithelial electrolyte transport, smooth muscle contraction, and cell volume. The KCNE4 gene encodes KCNE4 (originally named MinK-related peptide 3 or MiRP3), a member of the KCNE family of voltage-gated potassium (K_{v}) channel ancillary or β subunits.

KCNE4 is best known for modulating the KCNQ1 K_{v} α subunit, but it also regulates KCNQ4, K_{v}1.x, K_{v}2.1, K_{v}4.x and BK α subunits in heterologous co-expression experiments and/or in vivo. KCNE4 often, but not always, acts as an inhibitory subunit to suppress potassium channel function, but this varies depending on the channel subtype.

KCNE4 strongly inhibits the KCNQ1 potassium channel, which is known to play important roles in human cardiac myocyte repolarization, and in multiple epithelial cell types. KCNE4 inhibition of KCNQ1 requires calmodulin, which binds to both KCNQ1 and KCNE4. KCNE4 can also inhibit complexes formed by KCNQ1 and KCNE1. KCNE4 has no known effect on KCNQ2, KCNQ3 or KCNQ5 channels, but augments activity of KCNQ4 in HEK cells, mesenteric artery and Xenopus laevis oocytes.

KCNE4 strongly inhibits K_{v}1.1 and K_{v}1.3 channels when co-expressed in HEK cells and in Xenopus laevis oocytes, while leaving K_{v}1.2 and K_{v}1.4 currents unaffected. KCNE4 augments K_{v}1.5 current and surface expression twofold in CHO cells (but had no effect in Xenopus oocytes). Kcne4 deletion from mice impaired currents attributable to K_{v}1.5, in ventricular myocytes.

KCNE4 inhibited K_{v}2.1 currents by 90% but had little to no effect on currents generated by heteromers of K_{v}2.1 with the regulatory α subunit K_{v}6.4.

KCNE4 slows activation and inactivation of K_{v}4.2 channels, and induces overshoot upon recovery from inactivation. Co-expression with KChIP2 produces intermediate gating kinetics in complexes with K_{v}4.2 and KCNE4. Deletion of Kcne4 in mice impaired ventricular myocyte Ito, a current generated at least in part by K_{v}4.2.

Although mouse KCNE4 reportedly had no effect on K_{v}4.3 when coexpressed in oocytes, human KCNE4 was found to accelerate inactivation and recovery from inactivation of K_{v}4.3-KChIP2 complexes.

KCNE4 has also been found to regulate the large-conductance Ca2+-activated potassium channel, BK. KCNE4 inhibits BK activity by positive-shifting the voltage dependence of BK activation and accelerating BK protein degradation.

== Structure ==
KCNE4 is a type 1 membrane protein, with the transmembrane segment predicted to be alpha-helical. No studies have as yet reported the number of KCNE4 subunits within a functional channel complex; it is likely to be either 2 or 4. The majority of studies of KCNE4 function, structure-function relationships and effects of pathological gene sequence variants within KCNE4 have utilized the widely reported 170 residue version of the protein encoded by exon 2 of the human KCNE4 gene. However, in 2016 a longer form of the KCNE4 protein, termed KCNE4L, was discovered. An additional N-terminal portion of 51 residues, encoded by exon 1 of the human KCNE4 gene, were found to also be expressed in multiple human tissues, extending the human protein to 221 residues, by far the longest of the KCNE subunits. Human KCNE4L exhibits some functional differences to the shorter 170 residue form now also termed KCNE4S. KCNE4L is predicted to also be expressed in other mammals, reptiles, amphibians and fish, although the house mouse (Mus musculus) appears to only express KCNE4S because the KCNE4L start site is lacking in the house mouse genome.

== Tissue distribution ==
Human KCNE4L transcripts are most highly expressed in uterus, and next most highly expressed in atria, adrenal gland, lymph nodes, pituitary gland, spleen and ureter. KCNE4L transcript is also detectable in cervix, colon, optic nerve, ovary, oviduct, pancreas, skin, retina, spinal cord, stomach, thymus, and vagina.

In the rat heart, KCNE4 protein co-localizes with Kv4.2, a channel that KCNE4 also functionally regulates. In mouse heart, KCNE4 is preferentially expressed in ventricles versus atria, and in young adult males much more than young adult females. This is because cardiac KCNE4 expression is positively regulated by dihydrotestosterone. In rat mesenteric artery, KCNE4 augments KCNQ4 channel activity to regulate arterial tone.

== Clinical significance ==
A single polymorphism in the KCNE4 intracellular N-terminal domain, E145D, has been reported to affect predisposition to the relatively common chronic cardiac arrhythmia, atrial fibrillation, in Chinese populations, and to impair the ability of KCNE4 to inhibit KCNQ1. If KCNE4 inhibits KCNQ1 in the atrium, it is conceivable that removing this inhibition could shorten the atrial effective refractory period, which could predispose to atrial fibrillation, but this mechanism has not yet been substantiated with in vivo data.

== See also ==
- Voltage-gated potassium channel
