= Azetukalner =

Experimental anticonvulsant

Clinical data
- Other names: Encukalner; XEN1101; XEN-1101
- Routes of administration: Oral
- Drug class: KCNQ potassium channel opener

Identifiers
- IUPAC name: N-[4-(6-fluoro-3,4-dihydro-1H-isoquinolin-2-yl)-2,6-dimethylphenyl]-3,3-dimethylbutanamide
- CAS Number: 1009344-33-5
- PubChem CID: 24743936
- ChemSpider: 62962263
- UNII: 91WL7OD122
- KEGG: D12890
- ChEMBL: ChEMBL5095264

Chemical and physical data
- Formula: C_{23}H_{29}FN_{2}O
- Molar mass: 368.496 g·mol^{−1}
- 3D model (JSmol): Interactive image
- SMILES: CC1=CC(=CC(=C1NC(=O)CC(C)(C)C)C)N2CCC3=C(C2)C=CC(=C3)F
- InChI: InChI=1S/C23H29FN2O/c1-15-10-20(11-16(2)22(15)25-21(27)13-23(3,4)5)26-9-8-17-12-19(24)7-6-18(17)14-26/h6-7,10-12H,8-9,13-14H2,1-5H3,(H,25,27); Key:FJNPZKZPWVVSON-UHFFFAOYSA-N

Azetukalner, also known as encukalner and XEN1101, is an experimental small molecule anticonvulsant and selective K_{v}7.2/K_{v}7.3 potassium channel opener being investigated as a treatment for refractory focal onset seizures and major depressive disorder.

== Mechanism of action ==
Azetukalner works by selectively opening the KCNQ2/3 (K_{v}7.2/K_{v}7.3) voltage-gated potassium channels via positive allosteric modulation. The opening of these voltage-gated potassium channels, which are critical regulators of neuronal excitability, leads to an increase in the flow of potassium ions out of neurons. The loss of positively charged potassium ions results in the inside of the neuron becoming negatively charged and hyperpolarized. This hyperpolarized resting state reduces the ability of the neuron to fire, thereby decreasing the likelihood of seizures.

This mechanism of action shares similarities with the medication retigabine, which was withdrawn from the market in 2017 due to its link to skin pigmentation and retinitis pigmentosa. Azetukalner has a different structure and does not appear to cause this effect or the development of the chromophoric phenazinium-type dimers that resulted in this side effect in retigabine.

== Chemistry ==
=== Analogues ===
Azetukalner is an analogue of flupirtine, retigabine (ezogabine), pynegabine, and fluoxakalner.

== See also ==
- List of investigational antidepressants
- List of investigational bipolar disorder drugs
- Opakalim
