= Neonatal seizure =

A neonatal seizure is a seizure in a baby younger than age 4-weeks that is identifiable by an electrical recording of the brain. It is an occurrence of abnormal, paroxysmal, and persistent ictal rhythm with an amplitude of 2 microvolts in the electroencephalogram. These may be manifested in form of stiffening or jerking of limbs or trunk. Sometimes random eye movements, cycling movements of legs, tonic eyeball movements, and lip-smacking movements may be observed. Alteration in heart rate, blood pressure, respiration, salivation, pupillary dilation, and other associated paroxysmal changes in the autonomic nervous system of infants may be caused due to these seizures. Often these changes are observed along with the observance of other clinical symptoms. A neonatal seizure may or may not be epileptic (due to a primary seizure disorder). Some of them may be provoked (i.e., due to a secondary cause). Most neonatal seizures are due to secondary causes, with hypoxic ischemic encephalopathy being the most common cause in full term infants and intraventricular hemorrhage as the most common cause in preterm infants.

According to the International League against Epilepsy (ILAE), seizures are defined as excessive or synchronous neuronal activity in the brain that is manifested as signs or symptoms. As per the classification system by the American Clinical Neurophysiology Society, seizures can be classified into electroclinical (clinical signs of a seizure and electrical brain monitoring signs of a seizure), clinical only, and electrographic-only seizures (signs of a seizure on electrical brain monitoring without clinical-visual signs of a seizure). Some infants, especially critically ill ones, may experience electrographic-only seizures.

Neonatal seizures have been classified into various types. Neonates were found to experience either tonic or clonic seizures. If seizures were found to be focal, they were further classified into unifocal or multifocal. Seizures in the neonatal population can be mainly categorized into acute symptomatic seizures and neonatal epilepsy that is related to genetic or structural factors. Brain injury due to hypo-ischemic encephalopathy, ischemic stroke, intracranial hemorrhage or infection, inborn errors of metabolism, transient metabolic and brain malformations, lead to acute symptomatic seizures. Neonatal epilepsy may be credited to genetic syndromes, developmental structural brain abnormalities, or metabolic diseases.

The incidence of seizures is more common in the neonatal stage than in other stages of life. Neonatal seizures are comparatively rare and affect 1 or 3.5 in 1000 infants born. They are the most frequent neurological problem in the nursery that is associated with greater risks of morbidity and mortality, often requiring evaluation and treatment in a neonatal intensive care unit. Better care delivered in neonatal care units, with improved healthcare facilities, has decreased the mortality rate associated with these seizures. However, the long-term morbidity rate remains approximately the same.

Neonatal seizures are generally subclinical and their diagnosis based on the clinical observations is generally difficult. Diagnosis relies on identification of the cause of the seizure, and verification of actual seizure activity by measuring electrical activity with electroencephalography (EEG). The set of guidelines developed by the American Clinical Neurophysiology Society helps the healthcare providers know when the EEG is appropriate and corresponds to the seizures. Treatment depends generally on the underlying cause of the seizure if it is provoked. anti-epileptic drugs are also administered.

Neonatal seizures that are provoked (due to a secondary cause) usually resolve in the neonatal period when the secondary cause is treated. Neonates with epilepsy syndromes often have seizures later in life. It has been estimated that approximately 15% of neonatal seizures represent epilepsy syndrome. The incidence of seizures is higher in the neonatal period than at any other time of life, and most often occurs in the first week of life.

== Signs and symptoms ==
Seizures in the neonatal population often present differently than in other age groups due to brain immaturity. Electroclinical seizures are defined by evidence of seizure activity on electroencephalogram as well as clinical signs or symptoms.

=== Motor seizures ===
Classification systems have been developed based on neonatal seizure motor manifestations, summarized below.

Focal or multifocal clonic
Clonic seizures are defined by repetitive contractions of groups of muscles, typically of the limbs, face, or trunk. These may involve one group of muscles (focal) or multiple groups of muscles (multifocal). An isolated focal seizure can move or spread, and can even alternate from one side of the body to the other. If they occur on both sides of the body, they may occur simultaneously in an asynchronous manner. If a multifocal seizure, is limited to muscles of one side of the body, it may occur synchronously or asynchronously. Focal clonic seizures cannot be suppressed by repositioning of limbs or by physical suppression. Due to the neonatal brain's immaturity, the typical Jacksonian march may not occur. Focal seizures typically have very close correlates on EEG, with measurable EEG abnormalities with each seizure movement. The rhythm of the clonic movements and EEG abnormalities is usually slow, at 1-3 movements per second.

Focal tonic
Focal tonic seizures are characterized by sustained muscle contraction of facial, limb, axial, and other muscle groups. It often involves asymmetric positioning of the neck and trunk and appears as abnormal posturing of a single limb. Horizontal eye deviation may or may not be involved. They may be symmetric, asymmetric, focal, or multifocal. Such seizures cannot be provoked by stimulation or suppressed by restraint.

Generalized tonic
A focal tonic seizure can generalize, or the first seizure can occur as a generalized seizure, or seizures that impair the neonate's level of consciousness. Generalized tonic seizures typically appear as symmetric and sustained posturing of limbs in either an extensor or flexor distribution. Generalized tonic seizures often manifest with the tonic extension of the upper and lower limbs and also may involve the axial musculature in an opisthotonic fashion. Generalized tonic seizures mimic decorticate posturing; the majority are not associated with electrographic seizures.Such seizures can be initiated by stimulation and can be suppressed by restraint.

Myoclonic
Myoclonic movements can either be caused by seizures or be benign neonatal sleep myoclonus, a common mimicker of seizures in neonates. Myoclonic seizures are characterized by isolated and fast contractions of muscle groups that are non-repetitive. It generally involves flexor muscle groups of upper extremities- trunk, diaphragm, face. These movements typically occur in the limbs or face. Stimulation can provoke myoclonic seizures.

Spasms
Spasms include either flexor or extensor or both flexor and extensor. These occur in clusters and cannot be provoked by stimulation or suppressed by restraint.

=== Subtle ===
Some clinicians use the term subtle seizures to describe seizures that appear to be more normal and there is an absence of distinct tonic or clonic movements but the presence of abnormal eye movements, stereotyped lip-smacking, or apneic events. They may be difficult to diagnose clinically due to the subtleness of symptoms. Sometimes in subtle seizures complex limbic hyperactivity that is purposeless along with crying could be observed.

=== Benign ===
Benign neonatal seizures are not classified as epilepsy and the seizures usually resolve after 1–4 months. A benign familial neonatal seizure onsets as early as 3 days of birth and may involve one or both sides of the brain. Recurrent seizure episodes are observed to occur in neonates. Electroencephalogram of infants with BFNS often have normal readings. Sometimes, they may show theta pointy, a specific abnormality. They usually begin with tonic stiffening accompanied by apnea. Later clonic jerks are witnessed. It occurs in 1 in every 100,000 newborns.

This condition is usually inherited and is passed on in autosomal dominant manner. This condition is also caused due to mutation in KCNQ2 or KCNQ3 gene that may be carried by people bearing no family history of benign familial neonatal seizure. Mutation in these genes lead to excessive excitability of neurons.

Most of the infants with BFNS develop normally but some neonates with it may later develop intellectual disability which becomes evident in early childhood. In some patients approximately 15%, epilepsy recurs later in life. Myokymia is also witnessed in a few cases.

== Pathophysiology ==
Seizures in the developing brain are more common than in a mature brain for several reasons. First, the developing brain is hyperexcitable due to excess in excitatory glutaminergic neurons and immaturity of inhibitory gamma-amino butyric acid (GABA) neurons. Preterm infants are at especially high risk for seizures for this reason. During the neonatal developmental stages, numerous pathophysiological mechanisms, lead to excessive excitation and reduced inhibition, which lowers their seizure threshold when compared with that of adults. This has been proved in animal (rodent) models wherein the adult and infant models are administered with the chemoconvulsant agent and their threshold seizure potential is compared. This lowered seizure threshold potential makes the neonatal brain susceptible to acute symptomatic seizures.

- Seizure risk due to decreased inhibition: Gamma-butyric acid (GABA) is the main inhibitory neurotransmitter in adult humans. Upon binding with its receptor i.e. GABAa, it causes hyperpolarisation of the neuronal membrane by causing the net influx of chloride ions. This hyperpolarisation leads to inhibition of further action potentials. However, in neonates, there is a relatively high expression of NKCC1(sodium-potassium-chloride cotransporter 1) than KCC2(potassium-chloride cotransporter 2). NKCC1 causes net efflux of chloride ions while KCC2 is responsible for causing a net influx of chloride ions. Increased expression of NKCC1 leads to depolarisation of the neuronal membrane. This depolarisation removes voltage-dependent Mg from N-methyl-D-aspartate(NMDA) receptors and triggers calcium influx. The binding of calcium to the receptors causes the generation of secondary messengers that increases the risks of seizures and increase the excitability of the brain.
- Seizure risk due to increased activation: Glutamate is the primary excitatory neurotransmitter and the expression of its receptor is developmentally regulated. It binds to NMDA receptors, kainite receptors, and AMPA receptors. In course of the developmental stages, in several parts of the brain, a subunit of NMDA receptor-GluN2B is highly expressed which increases calcium influx. This mechanism increases the duration of postsynaptic currents in the immature brain in comparison to adult brains.

== Causes ==
Neonatal seizures have a number of causes. Determining the cause of a confirmed seizure is important because treatment and prognosis vary based on underlying etiology of the seizure. In contrast to seizures that occur in other age groups, seizures that occur during the neonatal period are most often caused by the following processes:

- Hypoxic-ischemic encephalopathy: This is the most common cause of seizures in the neonatal period, causing approximately 33% of neonatal seizures. The onset of seizure associated with it occurs within first 12 to 24 hrs of life. Delays in diagnosis may further increase the brain injury. Seizure semiology and severity varies with the location and size of injured region of the brain.
- Perinatal arterial stroke: Arterial stroke can be caused by intra-arterial thrombosis or embolism from the heart or placenta. The risk for perinatal arterial stroke increases with a variety of conditions that occur due to material factors during birth (oligohydramnios, chorioamnionitis, placental abnormalities) or neonatal factors (clotting disorders, congenital heart defects, coagulation problems, systemic infection, male sex, placental abnormalities). The onset of seizures associated with focal strokes begin after 24hrs to 48 hrs of birth. Focal clonic seizure is generally associated with it due to involvement of motor cortex in middle cerebral artery region.
- Intraventricular hemorrhage: This consists of bleeding in the ventricles, which are interior chambers of the brain. This is the most common cause of neonatal seizures in preterm infants.
- Central nervous system infection: CNS Infection are found in 3-10% of neonates who seize. Bacterial meningitis and viral meningoencephalitis are most prevalent, though fungal infections can occur as well. Infections caused by Group B streptococcus and herpes simplex virus are also possible causes. Seizures related to it persist longer than those associated with HIE or ICH.
- Congenital central nervous system malformations: lissencephaly, polymicrogyria, and tuberous sclerosis are specific entities known to cause seizures due to defects in brain tissue development. These are responsible for approximately 9% of cases of neonatal seizures.
- Inborn errors of metabolism: Inborn errors of metabolism can cause physiologic conditions that result in seizures. These errors are genetic and often are accompanied by other symptoms such as lethargy, poor feeding, and low tone. Diagnosis often involves specific laboratory tests of metabolic products as well as genetic tests. Several classification systems exist for seizures caused by inborn errors of metabolism, one of which separates causes into problems with neurotransmitter metabolism, energy production, and biosynthetic substances crucial for brain formation.
- Electrolyte abnormalities: Metabolic abnormalities such as hypoglycemia, hyponatremia, and hypocalcemia can manifest as seizures.
- Substance-related: neonatal abstinence syndrome occurs when maternal drug use before birth results in a fetal withdrawal syndrome. Substances include alcohol, cocaine, narcotics, tricyclclic antidepressants, or other sedatives. Seizures can be prevented from occurring if the symptoms of withdrawal are recognized and treated early.

== Diagnosis ==
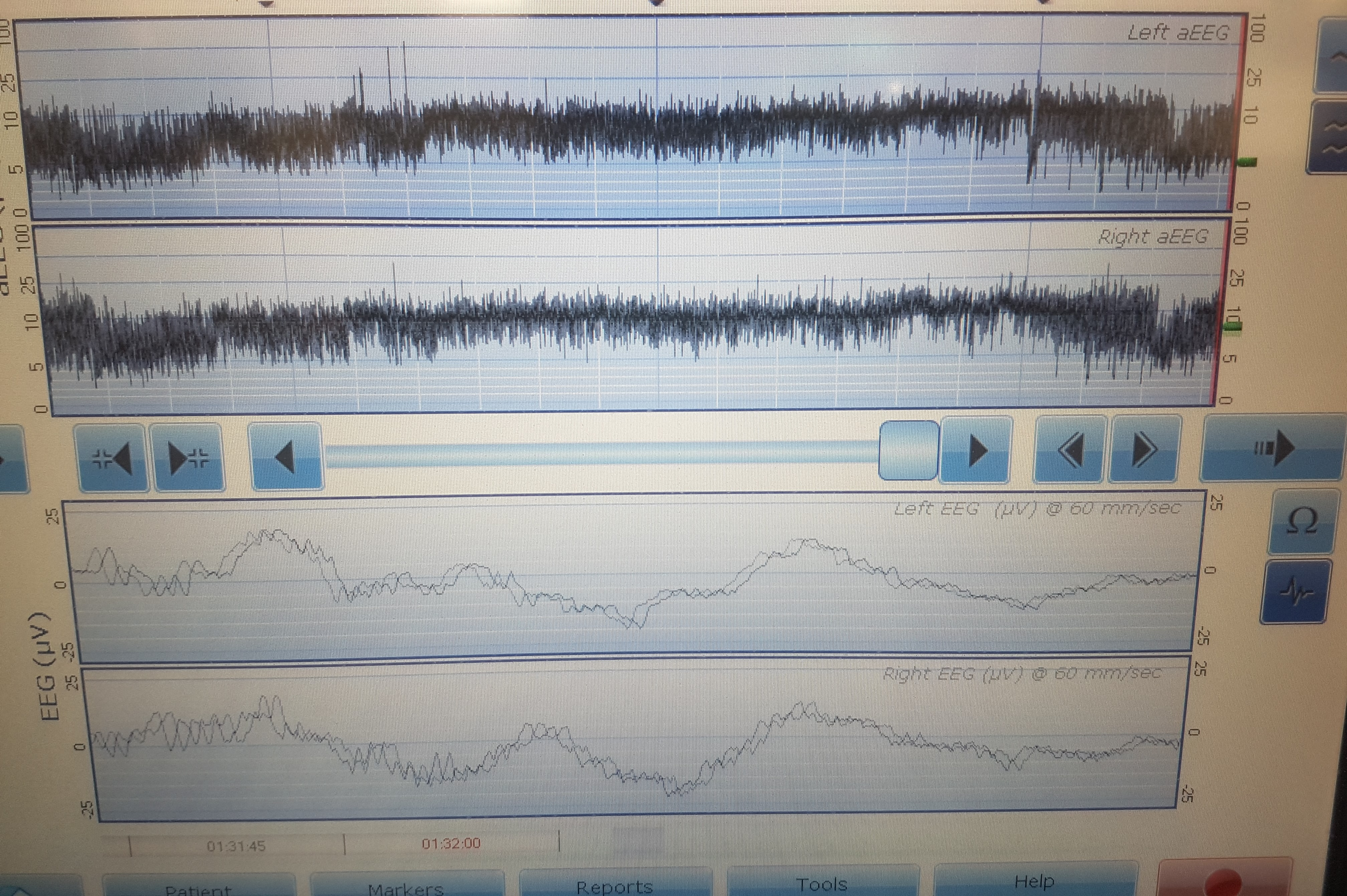
A normal amplitude integrated EEG trace in a term infant who is several days old. The amplitude-integrated trace is in the top half of the screen displaying left- and right-sided traces. There is a normal baseline and upper limit, sleep-wake cycling, and no seizures.

Seizure activity in a neonate is difficult to diagnose, as many seizures have subtle clinical symptoms. Diagnosis relies on a combination of brain monitoring (electroencephalography)(EEG) and observing clinical signs or symptoms of a seizure. EEG may be continuous or intermittent, and it may also be combined with video recording of the infant to correlate any seizure movements with EEG recordings.

There are several modes of EEG that are commonly used to diagnose neonatal seizures. Conventional continuous multichannel conventional EEG is the gold standard for diagnosis of epileptiform activity, but requires expert interpretation. Newer amplitude integrated EEG (aEEG) (also termed cerebral function monitoring, or CFM) allows easier monitoring of brain activity, but may not allow identification of short duration, low amplitude, or very high frequency seizure activity. Often, both modes are displayed concurrently.

Evaluation for infection (often with blood counts, blood cultures, or lumbar puncture) may be done to determine if there is a secondary cause of seizures. Blood glucose and electrolyte testing can identify metabolic problems that can be corrected. Further testing includes evaluation for genetic causes and other more rare metabolic causes. Genetic testing may be done with an epilepsy gene panel to determine presence of neonatal primary genetic epilepsy syndromes. Brain injury such as cerebral infarction or hemorrhage can be evaluated with imaging techniques such as magnetic resonance imaging (MRI) and brain ultrasound.

=== Differential diagnosis ===
Infants can exhibit stereotyped movements that may be hard to distinguish from seizure activity. Since many of these non-seizure movements are not dangerous and require no treatment, differentiation from actual seizure activity is useful. Jitteriness is common in the neonatal period and is seen in upwards of 2/3 of neonates. It is characterized by a tremor that is especially prominent during sleep or periods of agitation. Gaze deviation or eye movements do not occur. Benign neonatal sleep myoclonus (BNSM) is another common movement that can be mistaken for a seizure. It is characterized by jerking limb movements only during sleep, and stop with waking of the infant.

== Treatment ==
Once diagnosis is made, the goals of management are to identify the cause of the seizure, stop the seizure activity, and maintain physiologic parameters such as oxygenation, ventilation, blood glucose, and temperature.

Treatment greatly depends on the cause of the seizure. For example, infectious causes of seizures (meningitis, meningoencephalitis), are often treated with antimicrobials. Similarly, electrolyte or glucose abnormalities are treated by correcting the underlying abnormality.

If the cause of the seizures are unlikely to be easily or quickly corrected, once diagnosis of a seizure is made, the mainstay of treatment is pharmacotherapy with anti-epileptic drugs. Phenobarbital is the first line anti-seizure medication in neonatal seizures, regardless of the cause of the seizure. Phenytoin, levetiracetam, midazolam and lidocaine are used as second line agents. Almost 66% of patients with acute symptomatic seizures, don't have a complete response to the initial dose administered regardless of the medication.

Term or near term infants with moderate to severe hypoxic ischemic encephalopathy causing neonatal seizures may be treated with therapeutic hypothermia.

== Outcomes ==
With prompt diagnosis, mortality after diagnosis of neonatal seizures has decreased dramatically from an estimated 33% in the 1990s to around 10% in the 2010s. Underlying cause of the seizure remains the greatest predictor of ongoing seizures and neurologic problems later in life. Controversy remains with the extent of damage the seizures themselves cause. Clinician consensus is that frequent or intractable seizures (status epilepticus) leads to neuronal damage and are associated with later neurodevelopment problems.

Infants that are premature, have hypoxemic ischemic encephalopathy, CNS infection, severe intraventricular hemorrhage, structural central nervous system defect, or severely abnormal EEG tracings have a worse prognosis.

Low Apgar scores, need for resuscitation at birth, and perinatal distress place the neonate at greater risk for seizures.

For all infants with neonatal seizures regardless of cause, the rate of subsequent seizures during childhood is estimated between 10 and 20%. Infants who survive severe global HIE have the highest rate of epilepsy later in life.

Untreated or repeated neonatal seizures, especially prolonged seizures or status epilepticus, are associated with hippocampal sclerosis later in life.

== Epidemiology ==
It is difficult to determine the incidence of seizures in the neonatal period. Estimations range between 1-5 per 1,000 live births, with other estimates being 1.1 cases per 1,000 live births in full term infants and 14 cases per 1,000 live births in preterm infants. The actual rate of seizures during the neonatal period may be higher due to a lack of accurate diagnosis of sub-clinical seizure activity without continuous EEG monitoring. The epidemiology moreover varies in high-income countries (HIC) from that in low-income ones (LIC). The incidence is estimated to be 1-3 per 1000 live births in HIC whereas it ranges from 36 to 90 per live birth in LIC. Acute causes of seizures (hypoxemic ischemic encephalopathy, infection, intracranial hemorrhage, stroke, etc.) are more common than the first episode of neonatal epilepsy syndromes.

== Research directions ==
Since interpretation of continuous EEG monitoring requires a trained neurologist, automated interpretation software has been proposed. Algorithms and machine learning have been studied, however logistical and mathematic challenges remain.

== See also ==
- Epilepsy in children
