= KCNQ channels =

KCNQ genes encode family members of the Kv7 potassium channel family. These include K_{v}7.1 (KCNQ1) - KvLQT1, K_{v}7.2 (KCNQ2), K_{v}7.3 (KCNQ3), K_{v}7.4 (KCNQ4), and K_{v}7.5 (KCNQ5). Four of these (KCNQ2-5) are expressed in the nervous system. They constitute a group of low-threshold voltage-gated K^{+} channels originally termed the ‘M-channel’ (see M-current). The M-channel name comes from the classically described mechanism wherein the activation of the muscarinic acetylcholine receptor deactivated this channel.
