= Fluoxakalner =

Clinical data
- Drug class: K_{v}7.2 and K_{v}7.3 potassium channel opener

Identifiers
- IUPAC name: N-{4-[(4-fluorobenzyl)oxy]-2,6-dimethylphenyl}-2-phenylacetamide

Chemical and physical data
- Formula: C_{23}H_{22}FNO_{2}
- Molar mass: 363.432 g·mol^{−1}
- 3D model (JSmol): Interactive image
- SMILES: FC1C=CC(COC2C=C(C)C(N([H])C(=O)CC3C=CC=CC=3)=C(C)C=2)=CC=1
- InChI: InChI=1S/C23H22FNO2/c1-16-12-21(27-15-19-8-10-20(24)11-9-19)13-17(2)23(16)25-22(26)14-18-6-4-3-5-7-18/h3-13H,14-15H2,1-2H3,(H,25,26); Key:OAHSLLHOMXYHMH-UHFFFAOYSA-N

Fluoxakalner is a K_{v}7.2 and K_{v}7.3 potassium channel opener which is under investigation for potential medical use. Its EC_{50} for opening K_{v}7.2 and K_{v}7.3 channels has been found to be 360 nM. The drug produces analgesic effects in rodents and without causing sedation or locomotor changes. In addition, it did not inhibit various cardiac ion channels. The chemical synthesis of fluoxakalner has been described. Fluoxakalner was first described in the scientific literature by Wei Xiang and colleagues in 2026. It was developed as a replacement for retigabine, which was withdrawn from the market due to toxicity. Fluoxakalner avoids oxidative metabolites like retigabine's thought to be responsible for said toxicity.

== See also ==
- Retigabine
- Flupirtine
- Pynegabine
- Azetukalner
- Opakalim
