= Ankyrin-G binding motif of KCNQ2-3 =

Identifiers
- Symbol: KCNQC3-Ank-G_bd
- Pfam: PF11956
- InterPro: IPR020969
Available protein structures:
- Pfam: structures / ECOD
- PDB: RCSB PDB; PDBe; PDBj
- PDBsum: structure summary

In molecular biology, the ankyrin-G binding motif of KCNQ2-3 is a protein motif found in the potassium channels KCNQ2 and KCNQ3.

Interactions with ankyrin-G (ankyrin-3) are crucial to the localisation of voltage-gated sodium channels (VGSCs) at the axonal initial segment and for neurons to initiate action potentials. This conserved 9-amino acid motif ((V/A)P(I/L)AXXE(S/D)D) is required for ankyrin-G binding and functions to localise sodium channels to a variety of 'excitable' membrane domains both inside and outside of the nervous system. This motif has also been identified in the potassium channel 6TM proteins KCNQ2 and KCNQ3 that correspond to the M channels that exert a crucial influence over neuronal excitability. KCNQ2/KCNQ3 channels are preferentially localised to the surface of axons both at the axonal initial segment and more distally, and this axonal initial segment targeting of surface KCNQ channels is mediated by these ankyrin-G binding motifs of KCNQ2 and KCNQ3. KCNQ3 is a major determinant of M channel localisation to the AIS, rather than KCNQ2. Phylogenetic analysis reveals that anchor motifs evolved sequentially in chordates (NaV channel) and jawed vertebrates (KCNQ2/3).
