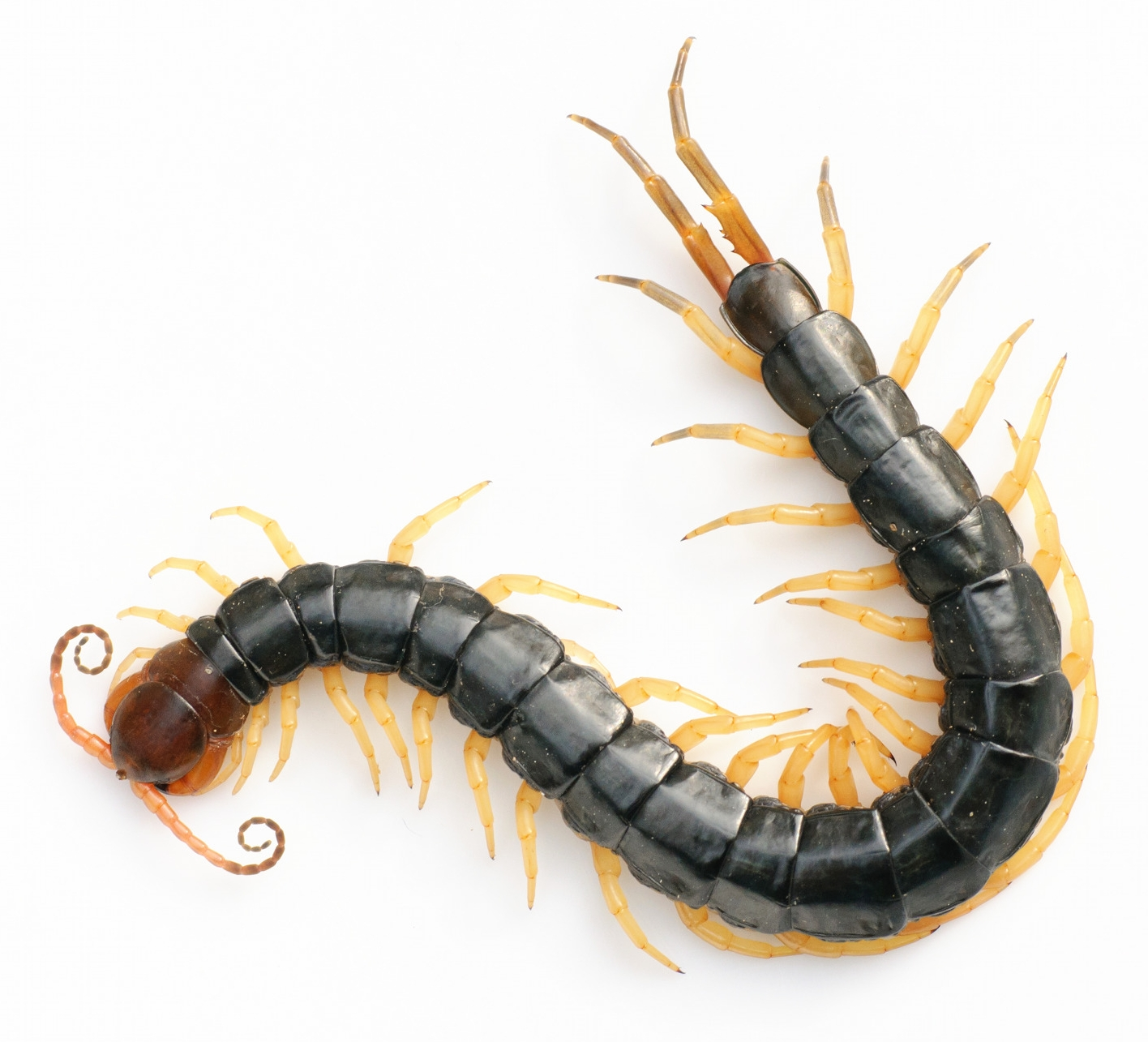

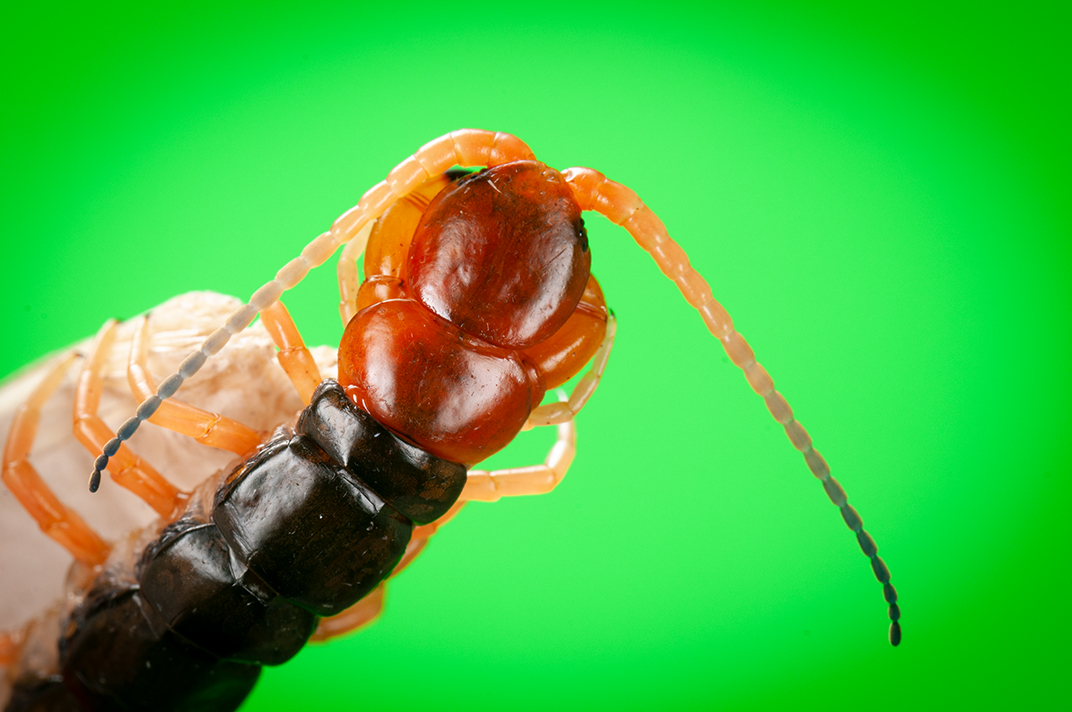
- Scolopendra multilans, Adult, South Korea

Scientific classification
- Kingdom: Animalia
- Phylum: Arthropoda
- Subphylum: Myriapoda
- Class: Chilopoda
- Order: Scolopendromorpha
- Family: Scolopendridae
- Genus: Scolopendra
- Species: S. mutilans

Binomial name
- Scolopendra mutilans L. Koch, 1878

= Chinese red-headed centipede =

Species of centipede

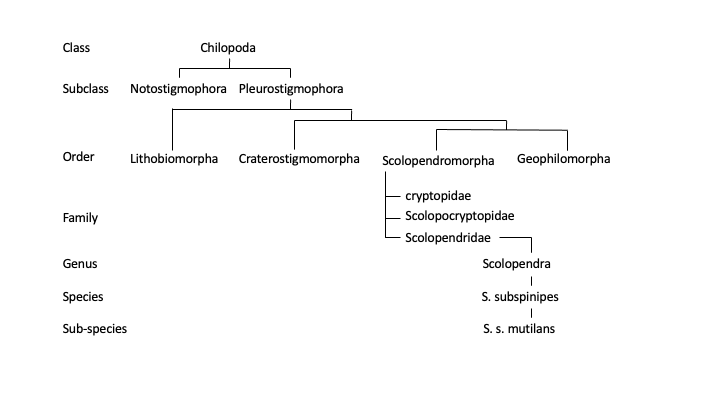
Centipede classification

The Chinese red-headed centipede, also known as the Chinese red head, (Scolopendra mutilans) is a centipede from East Asia (type locality: Japan). It averages 20 cm (8 in) in length and lives in damp environments.

Chinese red-headed centipede

In ancient Chinese traditions, this centipede is used for its healing properties. Putting a Chinese red head on a rash or other skin-disease is said to speed up the healing process. The roasted dry centipede is pulverized and used in Korea for the treatment of back pain, furuncles, and sores.

S. mutilans is known for harbouring little aggression to other centipedes, a trait very rare amongst giant centipedes, and allows it to be kept communally. Antimicrobial activities of the identified compounds were reported against Gram-positive and Gram-negative bacteria, fungi, viruses, and parasites, that possibly explain centipede's survival in harsh and polluted environments.

Females are incubator mothers, guarding the eggs by wrapping their bodies around their clutches until the eggs hatch.

S. mutilans differs from S. subspinipes in spination of the prefemur of the ventral legs, ventrally, dorsally, and medially.

== Venom ==
Venoms of centipedes remained largely unstudied, and the components remain largely unknown. The venom of the Chinese red-headed centipede contains a small peptide toxin called RhTx, which increases activation of the TRPV1 ion channel, causing a localized burning pain. The crude venom is said to be toxic in mice and to induce platelet aggregation. In addition, another 26 neurotoxins belonging to 10 different groups of peptides have been identified. In January 2018, Chinese scientists found an antidote to the painful venom of centipede in the drug retigabine, used to treat epilepsy.

The biological actions of the toxins in centipede venom are mostly unknown. A peptide named S. mutilans venom toxin peptide (SsmTP) and S. mutilans 6 were identified in S. mutilans's venom. SsmTP consists of 66 amino acids, and its composition highly resembles those of neurotoxins. The peptide is found within the venom duct. SsmTP was found to be toxic to cells depending on the concentration administered. It promotes cell growth in low concentrations in vitro (i.e. outside a living organism), but is cytotoxic in high concentrations. A low concentration of SsmTP also protects cells from oxidative damage by inhibiting programmed cell death (apoptosis) and the inflammatory response initiator caspase-1.

=== Venom system morphology ===
Little is known about the venom and the venom apparatus of centipedes. Studies on venom gland described it as the cuticle and epidermis being turned inside out. The venom gland consists of many epithelial secretory units, each with its own excretory system that is shaped like valves. Centipedes of the order Scolopendromorpha have interspersed radial striated muscles between the secretory units, where one end connects to the lumen of the venom gland and the other end connects to peripheral muscles. These muscles may be used for the contraction and constriction of anthe gland during venom ejection. The venom glands of Scolopendridae species are elongated cylindrical shape, with the lumen spanning almost the entire length of the gland. The long span of the lumen likely allows greater control over the secretion of different venom components. The venom glands span along the outer curvature of trochanteroprefemur of each forcipule.

=== Uniqueness of venom ===
Centipede venom generally contains a few different enzymes that are very different from other arthropods, where metalloprotease, an enzyme that breaks down protein plays an important role. Centipede venom has effects on skeletal muscles, heart muscles, and neurons, and the effects are attributed to the larger protein molecules in the venom.

Venoms of S. mutilans contain a diverse range of neurotoxins, including 26 neurotoxin-like peptides that belong to 10 different groups. Most of the 26 identified neurotoxin-like peptides have a different molecular structure compared to the neurotoxins found in spiders, snakes, scorpions, marine cone snails, and sea anemones. The functional mechanism of these peptides are similar to the neurotoxins of the mention venomous animals, yet their primary structures remain unique. A few were found to contain insecticidal properties and act on voltage-gated sodium, potassium, and calcium channels. It was found that both purified neurotoxins and unprocessed centipede venom are highly insecticidal, with the unprocessed venom being significantly stronger than all purified neurotoxins in insecticidal effects. Centipede venoms might have the potential to provide peptide candidates with potential pharmaceutical or agrochemical uses due to their high level of biochemical diversity.

== Behaviours ==
=== Predatory behaviour ===
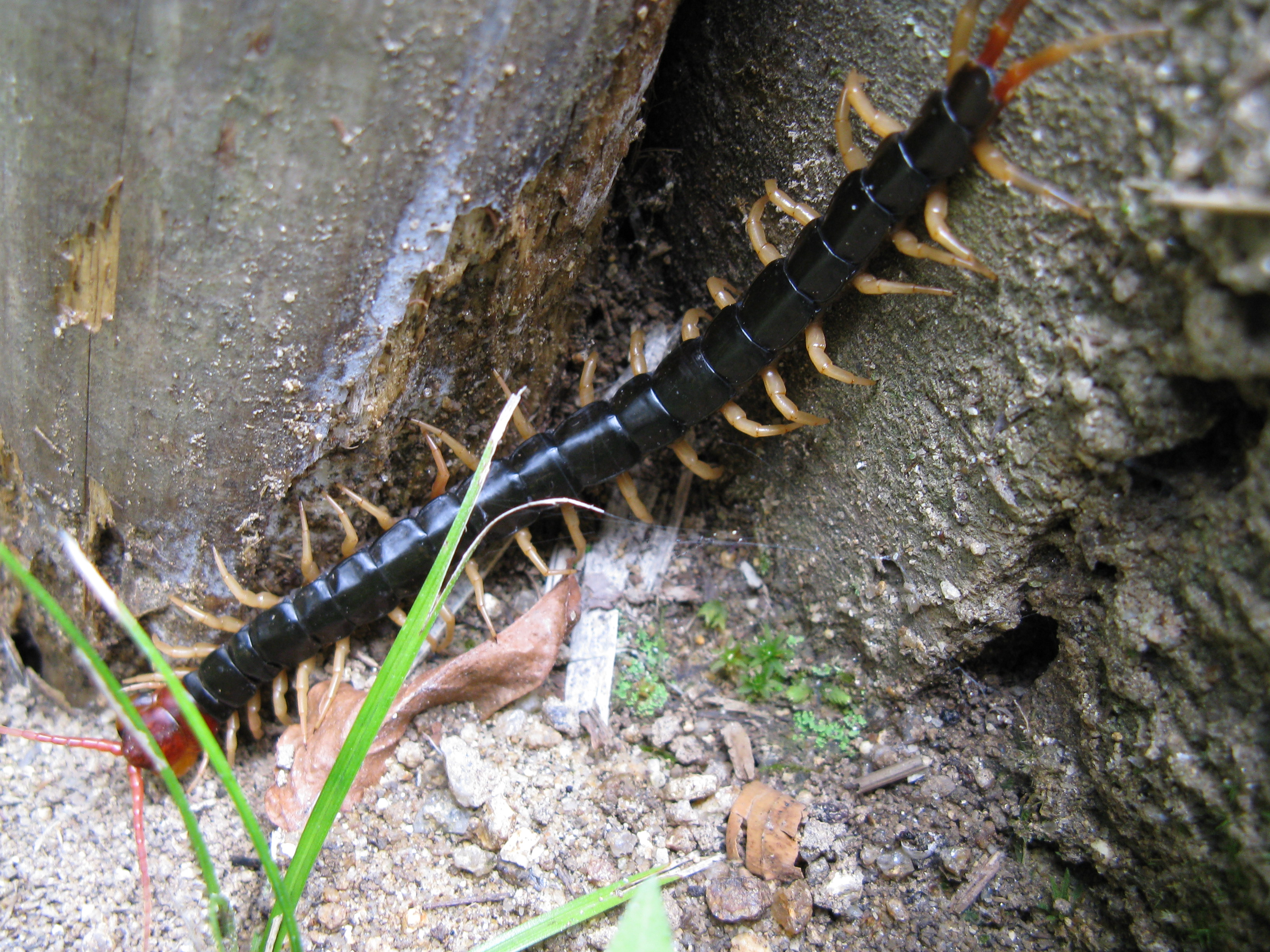
S. mutilans

S. mutilans, like other centipedes, is a predator that kills by injecting venom into its prey. Venom is injected to immobilize and break down internal tissues. Venoms of Scolopendridae, including Scolopendra mutilans, contain neurotoxins, which are suspected to be a significant fast-acting component in venoms of many centipedes. This species mainly feeds on live animals; plant materials are occasionally consumed but its consumption is considered negligible. To get hold of the prey, this centipede grabs prey with its anterior legs, and typically envenomates prey by stabbing it using its forcipules. Little quantitative ecological and behavioural work was done for centipedes. Some studies, however, have found that centipedes are highly selective and tend to strike at the head or thorax instead of the abdomen. If the bite was made on the abdomen, the centipede would usually reposition the prey and strike again on the head or thorax. Venom availability has a significant effect on predatory response. Returning to their normal attack rate after venom extraction takes more time when facing larger prey.

Research on these behaviours has suggested that the reason for centipedes to reposition their prey is to enhance the speed where neurotoxins in the venom arrive at the thoracic ganglia, where it controls limb movement or the brain. This explanation was based on the position of such ganglia locating on the abdominal side (i.e. ventral) side of the thorax, and the assumption that injecting venom in the prey's abdomen leads to venom dilution due to the mixing of fluids in the circulatory system and the guts; the distance where the venom has to travel to be effective also increases, making it less efficient in disabling the prey.

Two other concepts have been suggested to explain the reason for prey orientation - one suggested that venom is an expensive product to produce, hence venom conservation is essential; and the other concept suggested that striking the prey in that specific position (i.e. aligning the prey as the same orientation of the centipede) would allow the centipede to sufficiently restraint the prey until the venom takes effect.

=== Defensive behaviours ===
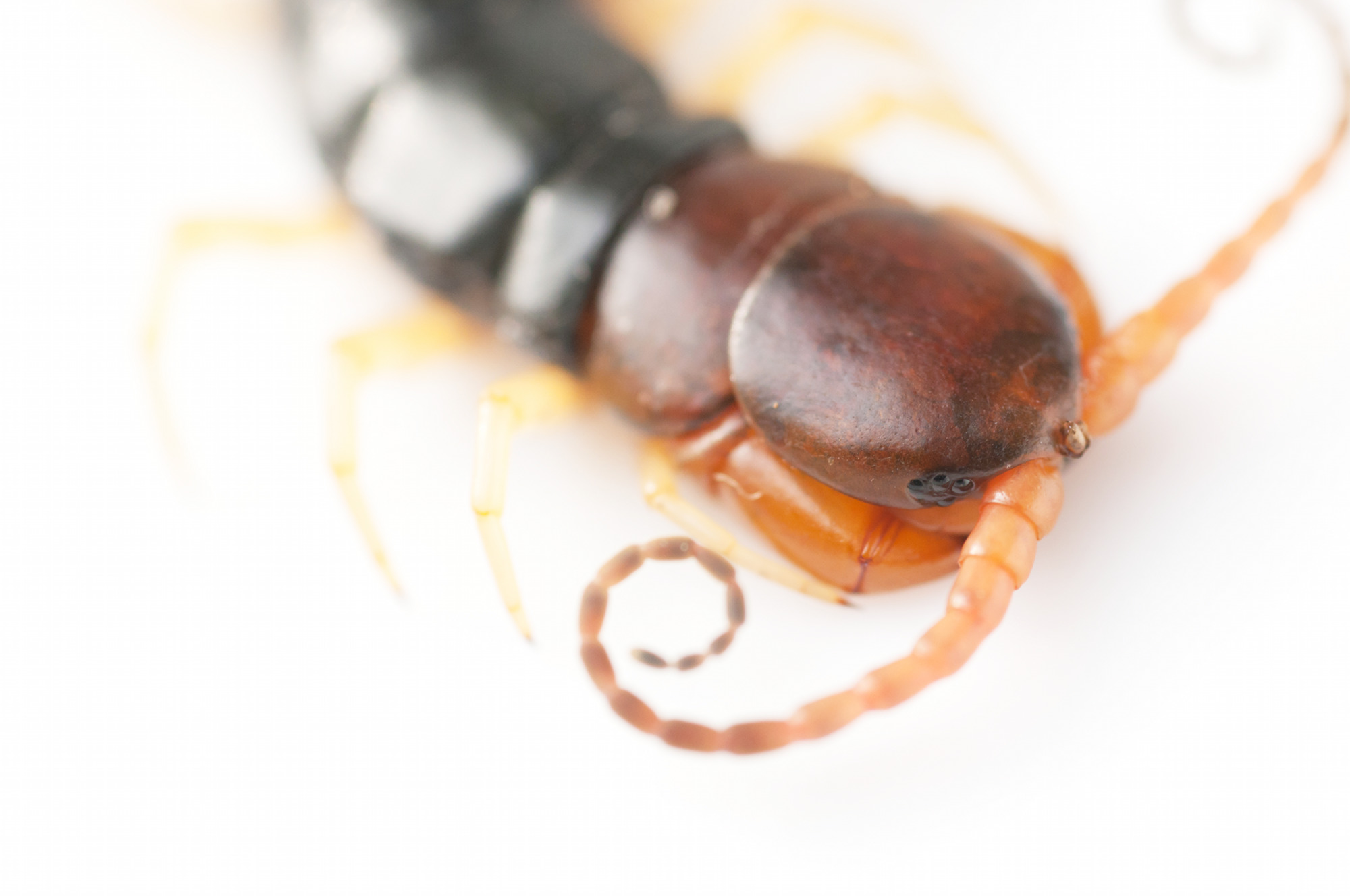

Behavioural studies found that when the centipedes are attacked near their heads, they would counterattack with their forcipules; when being attacked at the rear, they would adopt a warning position, where the last pair of legs (at the rear) would raise to display the prefemoral spines (i.e. prefemoral spines are short, spiky structures on the ultimate legs of centipedes; the spines are usually on the leg segment that is closest to the body). Centipedes occasionally attacked using the claws of their ultimate legs by a chopping motion following the warning position. When attacked in the midsection, the centipede curls sideways to reach the attacker with both its forcipules and ultimate legs at the same time. Apart from establishing a warning position and stabbing for defence, the ultimate legs are also used for grasping during mating, and acting as a hook to hang themselves.

== Uses by humans ==
=== Use in traditional medicine ===
In modern South Korea, S. mutilans and other Scolopendra species are used in Korean traditional medicine. The centipedes are used whole to treat various medical issues, including joint problems (which is its major use), alopecia areata, stroke, convulsions, lymphangitis, lumps or masses, neoplasm, poisonous tumours, carbuncles, and snake bites. These centipedes were considered one of the most prescribed, medically important, and expensive insect/arthropod drugs in Korean traditional medicine. They are frequently prescribed alone, despite arthropod drugs are usually prescribed with a mix of other medicinal materials for desired effects.

In China, S. mutilans is the only centipede species registered for clinical application by the Pharmacopeia of the People's Republic of China. Despite being the only species listed, other species of centipedes, including S. mojiangica, S. multidens, and S. negrocapitis, were also regularly used as substitutes in clinical practice.

=== Interchangeability of centipede species in clinical practices ===
Comparative studies on S. mutilans and S. mojiangica, a common substitute for the former, has found that in pharmacodynamics and toxicology, the two centipede species have similar effects, and is theoretically proved that S. mutilans can be replaced by S. mojiangica. The same study found that two species showed similar results in various fields, including effects on animal haemoglobin and weight, chromosomal aberration tests, anticonvulsive tests, effects on in vitro fungal and bacterial growth, and acute toxicity tests. The study also suggested both centipede species can be used in relatively large doses, as they were both low in acute and genetic toxicities.

Although the two centipede species were shown to be interchangeable in clinical practices, their interchangeability in clinical application was again questioned by some researchers, as more recent studies suggested that centipede proteins have a major role in their clinical effects. Through proteomics, researchers had found that the venoms of S. monjiangica and S. mutilans are different in the number of overlapping sequences and precursors for proteins and peptides. In addition, unique precursors were also found in both species for proteins and peptide levels. As the species differ in protein and peptide level, researchers of this study concluded that the interchangeability of centipede species requires further evaluation.

== Research significance ==
=== Cancer research ===
For hundreds of years, S. mutilans was used in traditional Chinese medicine for cancer treatment and other curative effects. Arthropod medicines were found to have a high level of antitumour effect in modern studies, and centipede is one of the major constituents of such medication. Extraction from these centipedes was found to be effective in controlling the proliferation of HepG2 cells (liver cancer). The mechanism by which the centipede extract alleviates liver cancer is related to the regulation of PI3/AKT, STA3, and MAPK signalling pathways.

Water extracts from the dried whole body of this species were reported to have antitumour properties, and would lead to enhanced immune responses. SPPC is a polysaccharide-protein complex that can be extracted from the centipede by pouring hot water over the powdered, dried body of the organism. In mice clinical trials, SPPC was found to effectively suppress the growth of S180 cancer cell in mice by promoting both specific and nonspecific immune responses. H22-bearing mice were found to have extended survival time with the administration of SPPC.

=== Antimicrobial peptides ===
As an arthropod, S. mutilans has no acquired immune system, which leads to the development of numerous antimicrobial peptides in its innate immune system.

An antimicrobial peptide named scolopendrasin VII was discovered in S. mutilans . The peptide stimulates actin polymerization; the subsequent chemotactic migration of macrophages was also stimulated by this peptide through activating ERK (extracellular signal-regulated kinases) and protein kinase B (Akt) activity. Scolopendrasin VII was also found to stimulate chemotactic migration of FPR1-transfected RBL-2H3 cells (mast cells), and directly binds to FPR1.

Scolopin 1 and 2 are antimicrobial peptides identified from the venom of S. mutilans. These peptides were identified by Sephadex gel filtration and RP-high-performance liquid chromatography. Both scolopin 1 and 2 were reported to show intense antimicrobial activities, which includes both Gram-positive and Gram-negative bacteria and fungi. It was also reported to have moderate haemolytic effects on human and rabbit red blood cells.

Scolopin 1 holds the potential as an antimicrobial agent. Scolopin 2 was found able to inhibit HeLa cell proliferation in cancer research; it was also found to combine with mitochondria, which allows it to regulate apoptosis in pathways in HeLa cells. Scolopin 2 is able to significantly suppress tumour growth in mice trials without causing any side effects. It was hence considered a strong candidate for HeLa cervical cancer treatment.

Amino acid sequence of Scolopin 1 and 2
| Scolopin 1 | FLPKMSTKLRVPYRRGTKDYH |
| Scolopin 2 | GILKKFMLHRGTKVYKMRTLSKRSH |

=== Food and medicine ===
A study by Kim et al. investigated the nutritional value of S. mutilans hoping to extend the application of this species from traditional medicine only. Nutritional analysis on this species found that it is high in crude protein (around 55%) and fat (around 26-30%). Essential amino acids were present, with lysine being the most common (around 3.5% of all essential amino acids), and glutamic acid being the most common nonessential amino acid present in the centipede (around 7% of all nonessential amino acids). Unsaturated fatty acids were also present, with oleic acid being the most common (around 41-48%). Mercury was found, but the concentration was below food safety limits. Pathogenic microorganisms were not found in the centipede samples. From these findings, the researchers suggested that S. mutilans has the potential to be a medicine and food ingredient.

=== Allergens ===
Both centipede bites and centipede-containing medicine can cause allergic reactions, yet no natural centipede allergen was characterized and officially identified until 2021. The novel allergen found in S. mutilans, Sco m 5, was the first natural centipede allergen to be identified and characterized by Lan et al. It was found that Sco m 5 can promote the degranulation of mast cells (i.e. degranulation of mast cells is associated with edema at the respiratory tract). Centipedes used in clinical practice are required to be boiled before administration, but it remains controversial whether to keep or discard the head of centipedes in medical uses, as the head contains the venom glands.

== See also ==
- Ssm spooky toxin
