= Renée Shellhaas =

American pediatric neurologist and professor

Renée A. Shellhaas
- Education: Middlebury College; University of Michigan Medical School
- Known for: Studying neonatal epilepsy, seizure detection and sleep; co-director of Child Neurology Society John M. "Jack" Pellock Residents' Seminar on Epilepsy; President-Elect of Pediatric Epilepsy Research Foundation; Board Member of American Epilepsy Society
- Scientific career
- Fields: Neurology, pediatrics, neonatal neurology, epilepsy
- Workplaces: Washington University in St. Louis; University of Michigan

Renée A. Shellhaas is an American pediatric neurologist and professor. She is the David T. Blasingame Professor of Neurology at Washington University School of Medicine in St. Louis and senior associate dean for faculty promotions and career development. She was previously an associate chair of career development and a clinician-investigator in pediatric neurology at the University of Michigan.

Shellhaas focuses on neonatal neurology and early life epilepsy. In 2020, she won the Sleep Science Award from the American Academy of Neurology for her work in sleep-disordered breathing and its impact on neurodevelopment in high-risk newborns. She also won a 2015 Strategic Research Award from the American Academy of Sleep Medicine Foundation for her work on sleep in neonates with spinal cord dysraphism.

Since 2022, she has been President-Elect of the Pediatric Epilepsy Research Foundation. She was elected to the Board of Directors of the American Epilepsy Society in December 2023.

== Early life and education ==
Shellhaas was born in Canada to two pediatric neurologist parents, Carol Camfield and Peter Camfield.

She pursued her undergraduate education at Middlebury College, then attended the University of Michigan Medicine, graduating in 2001. She went to the Children's Hospital of Philadelphia for residencies in pediatrics and child neurology, and remained for a fellowship in clinical neurophysiology.

== Career and research ==
Shellhaas went to the University of Michigan School of Public Health where she pursued further study in clinical research design and statistical analysis, obtaining her master's degree in 2009. She became director of research for the division of pediatric neurology and the associate chair for career development for the department of pediatrics. She was appointed the Donita B. Sullivan Research Professor in the department of pediatrics in 2021.

She is active in the American Academy of Neurology and the American Clinical Neurophysiology Society. She is a fellow of the American Academy of Pediatrics and the American Epilepsy Society.

She is active in the Child Neurology Society and was involved in the development of the Child Neurology Society Leadership, Diversity, Equity and Inclusion Task Force in 2021, along with Audrey Brumback, Erika Augustine, Diana M. Cejas and Phillip Pearl.

She has served as an associate editor of Neurology and is on the editorial boards of the Journal of Child Neurology, Pediatric Neurology and the Annals of the Child Neurology Society.

=== Neonatal seizures ===
In 2011, Shellhaas spearheaded the American Clinical Neurophysiology Society's guidelines on continuous electroencephalographic monitoring in neonates. She continued to work with the American Clinical Neurophysiology Society on the standardization of terminology and improved evaluation of normal neonatal EEG and neonatal seizures.

Major contributions to the field of neonatal epilepsy have included work demonstrating that antiepileptic medications can be safely discontinued in neonates after resolution of acute symptomatic seizures, demonstrating minimal risk for epilepsy at 2 years of life after resolution of acute symptomatic neonatal seizures, and evaluating and characterizing neonatal genetic epilepsies with the Neonatal Seizure Registry.

=== Sleep monitoring ===
Shellhaas has used electroencephalography to study normal and abnormal sleep patterns in neonates, to determine how this reflects developmental outcomes.

She has investigated sleep-disordered breathing (the apnea-hypopnea index) in neonates with spinal cord dysraphism, in infants under 3 months of age, and in neonates admitted to the NICU due to risk for seizures.

She has studied ways to improve NICU design and care in the NICU to improve neonatal sleep.

Shellhaas has also focused on qualitative work with patients' families and sleep quality with epilepsy.

=== Education and Mentorship ===
Since 2016, she has co-directed the John M. "Jack" Pellock Residents' Seminar on Epilepsy with epileptologists Elaine Wirrell and Phillip Pearl, an annual seminar in clinical epilepsy and EEG held in conjunction with the Child Neurology Society Meeting for residents in child neurology and neurodevelopmental disabilities.

In 2022 she received the Pediatric Department Chair's Award for Outstanding Mentorship at the University of Michigan.
