= Bimokalner =

Clinical data
- Other names: ACOU085

Identifiers
- IUPAC name: (1S,2S,4R)-N-[[3-(pentafluoro-lambda6-sulfanyl)phenyl]methyl]bicyclo[2.2.1]heptane-2-carboxamide
- CAS Number: 2243284-19-5
- PubChem CID: 135309173
- UNII: KEY5KKX6QY

Chemical and physical data
- Formula: C_{15}H_{18}F_{5}NOS
- Molar mass: 355.37 g·mol^{−1}
- 3D model (JSmol): Interactive image
- SMILES: C1C[C@H]2C[C@@H]1C[C@@H]2C(=O)NCC3=CC(=CC=C3)S(F)(F)(F)(F)F
- InChI: InChI=InChI=1S/C15H18F5NOS/c16-23(17,18,19,20)13-3-1-2-11(7-13)9-21-15(22)14-8-10-4-5-12(14)6-10/h1-3,7,10,12,14H,4-6,8-9H2,(H,21,22)/t10-,12+,14+/m1/s1; Key:KTTBVFVRXDRSSP-OSMZGAPFSA-N

Bimokalner is an investigational new drug under evaluation for preventing and treating hearing loss caused by cisplatin treatment. It is a voltage-gated potassium channel agonist targeting Kv7.4 and is being developed by Acousia Therapeutics GmbH.
