= C18H22F2N4O =

The molecular formula C_{18}H_{22}F_{2}N_{4}O (molar mass: 348.39 g/mol) may refer to:

- BMY-14802, a drug with antipsychotic effects
- Efinaconazole, a triazole antifungal
- Opakalim (BHV-7000, BPN-25203, and KB-3061)
