= M current =

M current is a type of noninactivating potassium current first discovered in bullfrog sympathetic ganglion cells.

The M-channel is a voltage-gated K+ channel (Kv7/KCNQ family) that is named after the receptor it is influenced by. The M-channel is important in raising the threshold for firing an action potential. It is unique because it is open at rest and even more likely to be open during depolarization. Furthermore, when the muscarinic acetylcholine receptor (MAChR) is activated, the channel closes. The M-channel is a PIP_{2}-regulated ion channel. Kv7 channels have a prominent expression throughout the brain.

== Function ==
=== Actions of M-currents: "phasic-firing" ===
M-channels are the reason for slow depolarizations produced by ACh and LHRH in the autonomic ganglia and other specified areas. 1. Initial depolarization of a neuron increases likelihood that M-channels will open. 2. M-channels generate an outward potassium current (I_{K}). 3. Potassium efflux counteracts sodium influx in action potential (AP). Overall result: full action potential is prevented.

=== Inhibition of M-current: "tonic-firing" ===
When muscarinic acetylcholine receptors are activated, potassium (K+) channels become more likely to be closed. Neuron becomes tonic-firing. This reduction in M-current is coupled with the actions of the G_{q} G-protein. Specifically, the hydrolysis of PIP_{2} to IP_{3}. This hydrolysis causes PIP_{2}, which is bound to the membrane, to become IP_{3} and dissociate from the membrane into the cytoplasm. When M-current is restored, it moves back to the membrane. There is some evidence for different theories of how M-channel activity is directly affected by PIP_{2}.

== Clinical implications ==
Benign familial neonatal seizures (BFNE) is an autosomal dominant inherited form of seizures. There are three known genetic causes of BFNE, two being in the channels KCNQ2 and KCNQ3.

Valproic acid and retigabine are examples of medications used to treat epilepsy which are known to mediate their anti-seizure activity partly through enhancement of the M-current.
