= Pynegabine =

Clinical data
- Other names: HN-37
- Routes of administration: Oral
- Drug class: K_{v}7.2 and K_{v}7.3 potassium channel opener

Identifiers
- IUPAC name: methyl N-[4-[(4-fluorophenyl)methyl-prop-2-ynylamino]-2,6-dimethylphenyl]carbamate
- CAS Number: 1821222-10-9
- PubChem CID: 92045023
- ChemSpider: 115007893
- ChEMBL: ChEMBL5180351
- PDB ligand: 9MF (PDBe, RCSB PDB)

Chemical and physical data
- Formula: C_{20}H_{21}FN_{2}O_{2}
- Molar mass: 340.398 g·mol^{−1}
- 3D model (JSmol): Interactive image
- SMILES: CC1=CC(=CC(=C1NC(=O)OC)C)N(CC#C)CC2=CC=C(C=C2)F
- InChI: InChI=1S/C20H21FN2O2/c1-5-10-23(13-16-6-8-17(21)9-7-16)18-11-14(2)19(15(3)12-18)22-20(24)25-4/h1,6-9,11-12H,10,13H2,2-4H3,(H,22,24); Key:HXUBJZRAVCPBRH-UHFFFAOYSA-N

Pynegabine (developmental code name HN37) is a K_{v}7.2 and K_{v}7.3 potassium channel opener which is under development for the treatment of epilepsy in China. The drug is an analogue of flupirtine and retigabine (ezogabine). However, it shows 55-fold greater potency in activating K_{v}7.2 channels and 127-fold greater potency in activating K_{v}7.3 channels compared to retigabine in vitro. In addition, it shows improved chemical or metabolic stability compared to retigabine and in relation to this may have reduced toxicity in comparison. The drug is under development by the Shanghai Institute of Materia Medica and Hainan Haiyao. As of 2026, it is in phase 2 clinical trials for epilepsy.

== See also ==
- Retigabine
- Flupirtine
- Azetukalner
- Opakalim
- Fluoxakalner
