= KCNQ2 developmental and epileptic encephalopathy =

Rare genetic disorder

KCNQ2 developmental and epileptic encephalopathy is a rare genetic disorder that typically presents with tonic seizures from the first week of life. The seizures can be frequent and often difficult to treat. Seizures can resolve within months or years but can impair the development of several domains such as motor, social, cognitive and language.

== Causes ==
Pathogenic variations in KCNQ2 are associated with developmental and epileptic encephalopathy (DEE). KCNQ2 is a voltage gated potassium channel within the brain, located on the long arm of chromosome 20, at position 13.3 (20p13.3). KCNQ2 gene is a critical molecular component of the M-current, a subthreshold voltage-gated potassium current controlling neuronal excitability by dampening repetitive action potential firing. DEE is caused by loss of function mutations in the KCNQ2 gene thereby reducing the activation threshold of the neuron and increasing the risk of hyperexcitability. KCNQ2 belongs to a family of ion channels, abbreviated Kv7.2. The KCNQ gene subfamily consists of five members (KCNQ1–5), all encoding voltage-gated potassium (K+) channel subunits (Kv7.1–5). The Kv7.1 subunit is expressed in the heart and Kv7.2-5 subunits are most abundantly expressed in the nervous system.

== Pathophysiology ==
KCNQ2 channels are voltage-dependent K+ currents that represent the molecular basis of the M-current (a voltage-gated and K+-selective current which derives its name from its suppression upon activation of M1 muscarinic receptors).

KCNQ2 encephalopathy is caused by heterozygous missense or in-frame indel mutations shown to have a dominant negative (DN; >50% reduction of the M-current density), or gain of function effect (GOF; >100% of the M-current density) when co-expressed with wild-type subunits.

== Diagnosis ==
KCNQ2 is ultimately diagnosed by molecular genetic testing. Approaches include the use of a multigene panel that includes the KCNQ2 gene and other genes of interest, comprehensive genomic testing, or a single-gene test for pathogenic variants of the KCNQ2 gene.

== Management ==
Anticonvulsant drugs can be efficacious in reducing seizure frequency and severity. Alternate treatments such as specialized diets, surgery and devices can be investigated if medications are unable to control the seizures.

== Research ==
Knockout and knock in mouse models have been generated to study the role of Kv7.2 channels in vivo. Both these mouse models show a reduced seizure threshold.

== See also ==
- Fred Trump III – has a son, William Trump, with this mutation
