= Opakalim =

Clinical data
- Other names: BHV-7000; BHV7000; BPN-25203; BPN25203; KB-3061; KB3061
- Routes of administration: Oral
- Drug class: K_{v}7.2 and K_{v}7.3 potassium channel opener

Identifiers
- IUPAC name: N-(1-tert-butyl-6-cyano-4,7-difluorobenzimidazol-2-yl)-3,3-dimethylbutanamide
- CAS Number: 2376397-93-0
- PubChem CID: 139487180
- DrugBank: DB22041
- ChemSpider: 129910012
- UNII: 73H9J7RBA2
- KEGG: D13061

Chemical and physical data
- Formula: C_{18}H_{22}F_{2}N_{4}O
- Molar mass: 348.398 g·mol^{−1}
- 3D model (JSmol): Interactive image
- SMILES: CC(C)(C)CC(=O)NC1=NC2=C(C=C(C(=C2N1C(C)(C)C)F)C#N)F
- InChI: InChI=1S/C18H22F2N4O/c1-17(2,3)8-12(25)22-16-23-14-11(19)7-10(9-21)13(20)15(14)24(16)18(4,5)6/h7H,8H2,1-6H3,(H,22,23,25); Key:VOPRSHDHZUHPBT-UHFFFAOYSA-N

Opakalim (INN, USAN; developmental code names BHV-7000, BPN-25203, and KB-3061) is a highly selective K_{v}7.2 and K_{v}7.3 potassium channel opener which is under development for the treatment of bipolar disorders, epilepsy, partial epilepsies, major depressive disorder, erythromelalgia, pain, infantile spasms, and mood disorders. It is taken orally. The drug was originated by Channel Biosciences and was under development by Biohaven Pharmaceuticals or Biohaven Therapeutics. As of April 2026, it is in phase 2/3 clinical trials for bipolar disorders, epilepsy, and partial epilepsies, phase 2 trials for major depressive disorder, and phase 1 trials for erythromelalgia and pain, whereas no recent development has been reported for infantile spasms and mood disorders. A phase 2 trial for major depressive disorder failed to meet its primary efficacy endpoint, resulting in focus more on epilepsy instead.

== See also ==
- List of investigational bipolar disorder drugs
- List of investigational antidepressants
- List of investigational analgesics
- Azetukalner
- Flupirtine
- Retigabine
- Fluoxakalner
