= Benign familial neonatal seizures =

Benign familial neonatal epilepsy
- Other names: Benign familial neonatal convulsions
- Specialty: Neurology

Benign familial neonatal seizures (BFNS), also referred to as benign familial neonatal epilepsy (BFNE), is a rare autosomal dominant inherited form of seizures. This condition manifests in newborns as brief and frequent episodes of tonic-clonic seizures with asymptomatic periods in between. Characteristically, seizure activity spontaneously ends during infancy and does not affect childhood development. However, some studies have reported that a minority of children with BFNS consequently develop intellectual disability. Additionally, BFNS increases lifetime susceptibility to seizures as approximately 14% of those afflicted go on to develop epilepsy later in life. There are three known genetic causes of BFNE, two being the voltage-gated potassium channels KCNQ2 (BFNC1) and KCNQ3 (BFNC2) and the third being a chromosomal inversion (BFNC3). There is no obvious correlation between most of the known mutations and clinical variability seen in BFNE.

== Signs and symptoms ==
BFNS often presents in the first week of life with brief but frequent episodes of tonic-clonic seizures, outside of which a child is completely asymptomatic. During the tonic phase of these seizures, infants may stop breathing (apnea) and consequently appear blue (cyanosis) due to lack of oxygen. Accompanying this is focal or generalized muscle stiffening. The clonic phase usually follows, during which the infant may make noises, display focal or multi-focal rhythmic jerking of the body, and/or display abnormal eye and facial movement. Characteristically, testing for seizures between episodes with EEG is normal. However, the appearance of a "theta pointu alternant pattern" and/or non-specific abnormalities on EEG has been reported in several cases, although their relationship to BFNE has not been well delineated. These seizure episodes resolve entirely within days to weeks, and in most patients have no effects on neurodevelopment. With that said, several studies tracking the health of patients with BFNE into adulthood have reported consequent intellectual disability and seizure disorders.

== Pathophysiology ==
=== BFNC1 ===
The most prevalent known cause of BFNE is mutation of KCNQ2, a gene encoding a voltage-gated potassium channel (K_{V}7.2). There are at least 35 such mutations, see Table 1, primarily located in the voltage sensitive S4 segment through the C-terminus. Of these mutations, 5 are nonsense mutations, 13 are missense mutations and 11 cause a frameshift in the coding sequence. There are also 5 splice variants, one of which has been characterized at the protein level and leads to a nonsense mutation. Finally, there is one large deletion that removes much of the carboxy-terminus of the channel.

While most BFNC1 mutations have not been further characterized, 14 have and all seem to lead to functional defects. Two of the mutations in the voltage-sensitive S4 segment, R207W and R214W, do not lead to a decrease in the whole-cell current (M current) produced by KCNQ2 channels but to a change in channel kinetics. The R207W mutation takes fourfold longer and the R214W mutation takes twofold longer to reach maximal current compared to wild-type channels. Since the time-course of an action potential is shorter than the time required for mutant KCNQ2 channels to reach proper levels of inactivation these mutants are expected to lead to neuronal hyperexcitability.

Though many of the other characterized mutations lead to decreased whole-cell current that has not been further delineated, three mutations have. Y534fsX538, for example, leads to a truncation that removes much of the carboxy-terminus of the channel. This mutant has been studied and shown to not traffic properly to the membrane. Two other mutations, P709fs929X and W867fsX931, lead to altered carboxy-termini, though they actually lengthen rather than truncate the protein. These abnormal extended proteins have been shown to be more rapidly degraded within cells and, thus, produce little current.

Table 1. Mutations in KCNQ2 associated with BFNE
Mutation		Region	Functional Consequence	References
Nucleotide	Amino acid	Region	Functional Consequence	References
c.232delC	Q78fsX132	N-Terminus		
c.314_316delCCT	S105CfsX872	S1		
c.387+1G→T	Splicing	S2		
c.584_593del10insA	S195X	S4		
c.C587T+c.T590C	A196V+L197P	S4		
c.C619T	R207W	S4	Slowed activation	
c.G622A	M208V	S4	Current decreased by ~50%	
c.C641T	R214W	S4	Slowed activation and increased deactivation	^{,}^{,}
c.C674G	H228Q	S4-S5		
c.T727C	L243F	S5		
c.C740G	S247W	S5	No current and dominant negative	
c.G807A	W269X	Pore		
c.848_849insGT	K283fsX329	Pore		^{,}
c.A851G	Y284C	Pore	Current decreased by ~50%	^{,}^{,}^{,}^{,}
c.G916A	A306T	S6	Current decreased by ~80%	^{,}^{,}^{,}
c.C967T	Q323X	C-Terminus	Current reduction by ~50%	
c.G998A	R333Q	C-Terminus	Current reduction by ~40%	
c.T1016G	R339L	C-Terminus		
c.1118+1G→A	Splicing	C-Terminus		
c.Intron 8_3' UTR del	Deletion 382→3' UTR	C-Terminus		^{,}
c.1217+2T→G	Splicing	C-Terminus		
c.C1342T	R448X	C-Terminus	Current reduction by ~40%	^{,}
c.1369_1370delAA	K457EfsX458	C-Terminus		
c.1564_1576del	S522fsX524	C-Terminus		^{,}
c.1600_1601insGCCCT	Y534fsX538	C-Terminus	No current due to no trafficking	^{,}^{,}
c.1630-1G→A	Splicing	C-Terminus		^{,}
c.G1658A	R553Q	C-Terminus		
c.G1662T*	K554N	C-Terminus	Decreased voltage sensitivity of activation	
c.C1741T	R581X	C-Terminus		
c.1764-6C→A	Splicing (V589X)	C-Terminus		
c.1931delG	S644TfsX901(extX56)	C-Terminus		
c.1959del?	T653fsX929(extX56)	C-Terminus		
c.2127delT	P709fs929X(extX57)	C-Terminus	No current due to increased degradation	^{,}^{,}
c.2597delG	G866AfsX929(extX56)	C-Terminus	Current decreased by ~95% due to increased degradation	^{,}^{,}
c.2599_2600insGGGCC	W867fsX931(extX58)	C-Terminus	Current reduction by ~75%	
* Misreported (twice in the same article) as G1662A (G1620A in the original numbering), which would not cause an amino acid change.
N.B. Mutations nucleotide/amino acid positions in terms of transcript variant 1 (NM_172107) available from PubMed. Consequently, some mutation positions differ from those reported in the original literature.

=== BFNC2 ===
Shortly after the discovery of mutations in KCNQ2 related to BFNE, a novel voltage-gated potassium channel was found that is highly homologous to KCNQ2 and contains mutations also associated with BFNE. This gene, KCNQ3, contains 3 known mutations associated with BFNE, all within the pore region of the channel. The first of these mutations, G310V, leads to a 50% reduction in whole-cell current compared to cells expressing wild-type channels. The reason for this change is unknown as the mutation does not lead to altered protein trafficking.

A second mutation, W309G, has also been found to be associated with BFNE. This mutation was only found in one family and has not been further characterized.

The final known BFNC2 mutation, D305G is also in the pore region of the channel. This mutation leads to an approximately 40% reduction in whole-cell current compared to wild-type expressing cells. The underlying mechanism for this current decrease has not been further delineated.

=== BFNC3 ===
The rarest cause of BFNE, occurring in only one known family, is a chromosomal inversion. This occurs on chromosome 5 and the inversion is of the p15 through q11 area. Affected individuals, thus, have the karyotype 46,XY,inv(5)(p15q11). Why this inversion leads to the BFNE phenotype is unknown.

== Management ==
Generally speaking, Neonatal seizures are often controlled with phenobarbital administration. While phenobarbital can be used for symptomatic treatment of BFNC, several studies have shown favorable response to anti-seizure medications that specifically block sodium channels (see article on Sodium channel blocker). However, at this time, phenobarital is the first line therapy for BFNC. Recurrent seizures later in life are treated in the standard ways (covered in the main epilepsy article). Depending on the severity, some infants are sent home with heart and oxygen monitors that are hooked to the child with stick on electrodes to signal any seizure activity. Once a month the monitor readings are downloaded into a central location for the doctor to be able to read at a future date. This monitor is only kept as a safeguard as usually the medication wards off any seizures. Once the child is weaned off the phenobarbital, the monitor is no longer necessary.

== History ==
BFNE was first described in 1964 by Andreas Rett and named by Bjerre and Corelius four years later. Andreas Rett is better known for his later characterization of Rett syndrome. Both studies were published in German, but have yet to be translated in English. The mutations associated with BFNE were first mapped and descripted by Leppert and colleagues in 1989.
