= Flupirtine =

Non-opioid analgesic

Clinical data
- Trade names: Katadolon, others
- Other names: Flupertine
- AHFS/Drugs.com: International Drug Names
- Routes of administration: Oral
- Drug class: Analgesic; KCNQ potassium channel opener
- ATC code: N02BG07 (WHO)

Pharmacokinetic data
- Bioavailability: 90% (oral), 70% (rectal)
- Metabolism: Hepatic to 2-amino-3-acetylamino-6-(para-fluorobenzylamino) pyridine (which has 20-30% the analgesic potential of its parent compound), para-fluorohippuric acid and a mercapturic acid metabolite, presumably formed from a glutathione adduct
- Elimination half-life: 6.5 hours (average), 11.2–16.8 hours (average 14 hours) (elderly), 8.7–10.9 hours (average 9.8 hours) (in those with moderate-level renal impairment)
- Excretion: 72% of flupirtine and its metabolites appear in urine and 18% appear in feces

Identifiers
- IUPAC name: ethyl {2-amino-6-[(4-fluorobenzyl)amino]pyridin-3-yl}carbamate
- CAS Number: 56995-20-1
- PubChem CID: 53276
- IUPHAR/BPS: 2598
- ChemSpider: 48119
- UNII: MOH3ET196H
- KEGG: D07978
- ChEMBL: ChEMBL255044
- CompTox Dashboard (EPA): DTXSID4048436
- ECHA InfoCard: 100.054.986

Chemical and physical data
- Formula: C_{15}H_{17}FN_{4}O_{2}
- Molar mass: 304.325 g·mol^{−1}
- 3D model (JSmol): Interactive image
- SMILES: Fc1ccc(cc1)CNc2nc(N)c(NC(=O)OCC)cc2
- InChI: InChI=1S/C15H17FN4O2/c1-2-22-15(21)19-12-7-8-13(20-14(12)17)18-9-10-3-5-11(16)6-4-10/h3-8H,2,9H2,1H3,(H,19,21)(H3,17,18,20); Key:JUUFBMODXQKSTD-UHFFFAOYSA-N

Flupirtine, sold under the brand name Katadolon, is an analgesic medication which was originally used to treat acute and chronic pain. It acts as a selective neuronal KCNQ potassium channel opener. The drug first became available in Europe in 1984 and after it went off patent many generic brands were introduced. In 2013, due to issues with liver toxicity, the European Medicines Agency restricted its use to acute pain, for no more than two weeks, and only for people who cannot use other painkillers. In March 2018, marketing authorisations for flupirtine were withdrawn following a European Medicines Agency recommendation based on the finding that the restrictions introduced in 2013 had not been sufficiently followed in clinical practice, and cases of serious liver injury still occurred including liver failure.

== Medical uses ==
Flupirtine is used as an analgesic for acute pain, in moderate-to-severe cases. Its muscle relaxant properties make it popular for back pain and other orthopaedic uses, but it is also used for migraines, in oncology, postoperative care, and gynaecology.

In 2013 due to issues with liver toxicity, the European Medicines Agency restricted its use to acute pain, for no more than two weeks, and only for people who cannot use other painkillers.

== Side effects ==
The most serious side effect is frequent hepatotoxicity which prompted regulatory agencies to issue several warnings and restrictions.

Flupirtine is devoid of negative psychological or motor function effects, or effects on reproductive function.

== Pharmacology ==
=== Pharmacodynamics ===
Flupirtine is a selective neuronal KCNQ (K_{v}7) potassium channel opener. This action is thought to be primarily responsible for its effects. The drug may also act as a GABA_{A} receptor positive allosteric modulator and this action may be involved in its muscle relaxant effects. The drug was long thought to act as an NMDA receptor antagonist, but it does not directly interact with NMDA receptors. Instead, it has been elucidated that flupirtine indirectly inhibits NMDA receptors by opening KCNQ potassium channels. As such, the drug has since been described as an indirect or "functional" NMDA receptor antagonist. Flupirtine was the first KCNQ potassium channel opener to be introduced for medical use.

== Chemistry ==
=== Analogues ===
Retigabine is a bioisostere of flupirtine in which the pyridine ring has been replaced with a phenyl ring. Azetukalner (encukalner), pynegabine, and fluoxakalner are also analogues of flupirtine and retigabine.

== History ==
Flupirtine was discovered and developed between the 1970s and the 1990s by Chemiewerk Homburg in Frankfurt am Main, Germany, which became Degussa Pharma Group and then through mergers, ASTA Pharma and Asta Medica. Retigabine, a bioisostere of flupirtine, was discovered as part of the same program and has a similar mechanism of action. Flupirtine was approved for the treatment of pain in 1984 in Europe under the brand name Katadolon.

As of 2013 it was used in 11 member countries: Bulgaria, Estonia, Germany, Hungary, Italy, Latvia, Lithuania, Poland, Portugal, Romania and Slovak Republic. Many generics entered the European market around 2011.

It was never introduced to the United States market for any indication but in 2008, Adeona Pharmaceuticals, Inc. (now called Synthetic Biologics, Inc.) obtained an option to license issued and patent pending applications relating to flupirtine's use in the treatment of ophthalmic indications, particularly retinitis pigmentosa.

As of 2016 it is marketed under many brand names, including Efiret, Flupigil, Flupirtin, Flupirtina, Flupirtine, Flupizen, Fluproxy, Katadolon, Metanor, Trancolong, and Zentiva.

== Society and culture ==
=== Recreational use ===
Although some studies have reported flupirtine has no addictive properties, there was suggestion that it may possess some miuse potential and liability. There were at least two registered cases of flupirtine misuse. Drug tolerance does not develop in most cases, but has individually occurred. Flupirtine was reported as a novel designer drug in 2025. The effects of flupirtine have been said to be very difficult to describe. They have been reported to include "strong helicopter-like effects at high doses" causing users to have to "walk leaning against a wall", dissociative effects, feelings of euphoria throughout the body, and a very light buzzing sensation. Some have compared it to mephedrone, while others have described the physical bodily sensations as similar to those of MDMA and other entactogens. The drug is said to be able to produce psychosis and mania as adverse effects and to do so more readily than cathinone stimulants. The euphoria produced by flupirtine is said to last 40 to 60 minutes, whereas other effects last all day. The effects are said to convert after 2 hours from stimulant or euphoriant effects into a kind of nootropic effect that affects thinking. The drug is frequently used to enhance the effects of other recreational drugs.

== Research ==
Flupirtine has been noted for its neuroprotective properties, and has been investigated for possible use in Creutzfeldt–Jakob disease, Alzheimer's disease, and multiple sclerosis. It has also been proposed as a possible treatment for Batten disease.

Flupirtine underwent a clinical trial as a treatment for multiple sclerosis and fibromyalgia. Flupirtine showed promise for fibromyalgia due to its different action than the three approved by U.S. FDA drugs: pregabalin, milnacipran, and duloxetine. Additionally, there are case reports regarding flupirtine as a treatment for fibromyalgia. Adeona Pharmaceuticals (now called Synthetic Biologics) sub-licensed its patents for using flupirtine for fibromyalgia to Meda AB in May 2010.
