= Ssm6a =

Centipede toxin

Ssm6a (Scolopendra subspinipes mutilans 6), or μ-SLPTX-Ssm6a, is a toxin from the venom of the Chinese red-headed centipede. It has strong analgesic properties, probably owing to its strong inhibitory effects on Nav1.7 channels.

== Sources ==
Ssm6a is purified from the venom of the Chinese red-headed centipede, Scolopendra subspinipes mutilans, found in Southeast Asia.

== Biochemistry ==
=== Family ===
Ssm6a is part of the scoloptoxin family (SPLTX), together with Ssm1a, Ssm2a, and Ssm3a, all found in the venom of the centipede.

=== Synthesis ===
The mature form of Ssm6a is composed of 46 amino acids. It is the result of posttranslational modification of a prepropeptide. The prepropeptide is 112 amino acids long. The 21 N-terminal amino acids are related to a signal sequence, the 43 following amino acids are referred as a propeptide sequence. The 46 C-terminal amino acids are the Ssm6a peptide.

=== Structure ===
Ssm6a shares only 40% of identity with its most related protein, κ-SLPTX-Ssm1, another toxin recently isolated from the venom of the same centipede. The 3D structure analysis reveal six cysteine residues forming three disulfide bonds: Cys5–Cys32, Cys15–Cys31, Cys18–Cys41. This structure is very similar to an inhibitor cystine knot, commonly found in invertebrate toxins.

=== Stability and Specificity ===
Ssm6a is quite resistant to proteases in human blood and it remains stable under high temperatures. This stability is due to the primarily alpha-helical structure and three disulfide bonds.

Target Ssm6a has a strong inhibitory effect on Nav1.7 channels (IC50=25.4 nM). It has a less potent inhibitory effect on Nav1.1 (IC50=4.1 μM), Nav1.2 (IC50=813 nM) or on Nav1.6 channels (IC50=15.2 μM). Recent reports have not been able to verify the Nav1.7 specific activity which has been claimed in the original publication.

== Mode of action ==
The inhibitory effect of Ssm6a on NaV channels can be partly overcome by a higher depolarization, suggesting that Ssm6a is a gating modifier that interacts with the voltage-sensing domains of voltage-dependent sodium channels.

== Therapeutic use ==
Nav1.7 channels are present at the endings of pain-sensing nerves. These channels are key components in nociception. Rodent treated with Ssm6a exhibit a drastically decreased in nociceptive response. Ssm6a show a significantly higher efficiency than morphine in response to induced abdominal writhing (by injection of acid) and thermal pain (by photothermal heat). Ssm6a is now considered as a potential morphine substitute, due to its analgesic properties, and apparent lack of side effects. Recent reports have not been able to verify the Nav1.7 specific activity which has been claimed in the original publication.
