= RhTx =

Peptide toxin

RhTx is a small peptide toxin from Scolopendra subspinipes mutilans, also called the Chinese red-headed centipede. RhTx binds to the outer pore region of the temperature regulated TRPV1 ion channel, preferably in activated state, causing a downwards shift in the activation threshold temperature, which leads to the immediate onset of heat pain.

== Sources ==
RhTx is a component of the venom of the S. subspinipes mutilans, also called the Chinese red-headed centipede.

== Chemistry ==
RhTx is a small peptide toxin, with a compact 3D-structure. The gene encoding for RhTx translates into a 69 amino acid peptide that shows no homology to any known animal toxin. This peptide, after post- translational modifications, yields a mature toxin of 27 amino acids. RhTx has two pairs of disulfide bonds. While the N-terminus of the peptide contains no charged amino acids, the C-terminus of the peptide is rich in charged amino acids. In the folded peptide, these charged amino acids are all located on the same side of the peptide, making RhTx a polar molecule.

== Target ==
RhTx binds to the outer pore region of the polymodal TRPV1 ion channel. The toxin preferably binds to TRPV1 in the activated state of the channel. RhTx has a high affinity for the TRPV1 ion channel, which results in very rapid binding and slow unbinding. The TRPV1 channel is a non-selective cation channel, with a high permeability to Ca^{2+}. TRPV1 is mainly expressed in sensory neurons and can be activated by different stimuli, including high temperatures (heat), acids, pollutants with negative electric charge and endogenous metabolites such as anandamide. The channel is also targeted by the active component of chilli peppers capsaicin, and the spider toxins Vanillotoxin and DkTx.

== Mode of action ==
After binding to the outer pore region of the TRPV1, RhTx can interact with both the turret and the pore helix through electrostatic and hydrophobic interactions. RhTx binding is expected to induce conformational changes to the outer pore, which are thought to be the cause of the drop of the activation threshold for the TRPV1 channel. These changes strongly promote the opening of the TRPV1 channel at the normal body temperature of the organism, resulting in intense burning pain. It is hypothesized that RhTx binding might also interfere with ion permeation due to its interaction with the pore helix.

== Toxicity ==
In mice, injections of RhTx induced pain behavior, which was distinct from pain behavior mediated by inflammation, but similar to the behavior elicited by capsaicin injection. Injections in mice also caused a rapid drop of core body temperature at normal conditions, by less than 1 degree Celsius. The EC_{50} in mice is estimated to be 500 nM. While the effect of isolated RhTx administration is not known in humans, bites of the S. subspinipes mutilans species generally cause immediate localized burning pain, followed by edema, erythema and other localized symptoms. Serious morbidity is very uncommon and treatment is supportive, focusing on treating symptoms.
