= Benign neonatal sleep myoclonus =

Occurrence of jerky movements during sleep

- Specialty: Paediatrics

Benign neonatal sleep myoclonus (BNSM) is the occurrence of myoclonus (jerky movements) during sleep. It is not associated with seizures.

BNSM occurs in the first few weeks of life, and usually resolves on its own within the first 3-4 months of life.
