= Phillip L. Pearl =

American neurologist

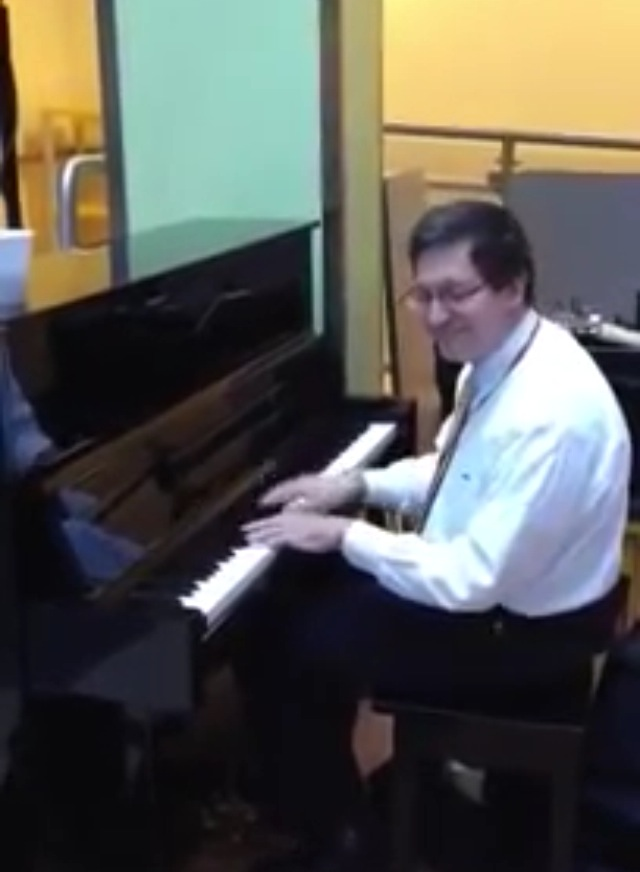
- Phillip L. Pearl playing jazz piano for his patients
- Born: Baltimore, Maryland, United States
- Education: Johns Hopkins University (B.S.); University of Maryland School of Medicine (M.D.)
- Scientific career
- Fields: Neurologist and author

Phillip L. Pearl is an American child neurologist, epileptologist, educator, and musician. He is currently the Director of the Epilepsy and Clinical Neurophysiology Division and William G. Lennox Chair in the Department of Neurology at Boston Children's Hospital, and Professor of Neurology at Harvard Medical School.

He is known for his research on inherited metabolic epilepsies, particularly disorders of GABA metabolism such as succinic semialdehyde dehydrogenase deficiency (SSADHD). He is also active in the intersection of medicine and music and is affiliated with the Berklee College of Music's Music and Health Institute.

== Biography ==
Originally from Baltimore, Pearl studied natural sciences at Johns Hopkins University, where he earned his undergraduate degree with honors in 1980. He received his medical degree from the University of Maryland School of Medicine in 1984.

He completed his pediatric training at Baylor College of Medicine, followed by residency in neurology and child neurology.

He then undertook fellowship training in clinical neurophysiology and epilepsy at Boston Children's Hospital and Beth Israel Deaconess Medical Center, affiliated with Harvard Medical School.

In addition to his clinical training, Pearl pursued professional development in medical education and leadership. He completed the Master Teacher's Program in Medical Education and earned a graduate certificate in leadership development at George Washington University. He later attended the Program for Chiefs of Clinical Services at the Harvard T.H. Chan School of Public Health.

== Career ==
Pearl returned to the Mid-Atlantic after completion of training at Harvard and held overlapping teaching and clinical roles across several institutions from the early 1990s through 2013. He served as Director of Medical Student Education in Neurology at George Washington University (GWU) from 2002-2013, Child Neurology Program Director at Children's National Medical Center from 2002-2011, and Division Chief of Child Neurology from 2011-2013.

In 2014, Pearl joined Boston Children's Hospital as Director of the Epilepsy and Clinical Neurophysiology Division and the William G. Lennox Chair in the Department of Neurology and was appointed Professor of Neurology at Harvard Medical School.

His academic work expanded to include Director of the Harvard Medical School Leadership Program in Pediatrics and visiting professorships throughout the US and world. He currently serves on the board of the International Child Neurology Association.

He is Past President of the Child Neurology Society and the Professors and Educators of Child Neurology.

== Research and works ==
Pearl's primary research focus is on inherited metabolic epilepsies, especially those involving GABA metabolism, such as SSADHD. In collaboration with K. Michael Gibson PhD, he helped define clinical and neurophysiological features of the disorder and has maintained NIH research funding since 2004. He is currently the Principal Investigator on the NIH supported natural history study of the disorder.

He has written or edited eight books one translated into Chinese and another into Japanese, including Inherited Metabolic Epilepsies, currently in its second edition.

Pearl served as an editor for the sixth edition and is co-editor in chief (with Steve Ashwal) of the seventh edition of Swaiman's Pediatric Neurology.

=== Music and Medicine ===
A percussionist since childhood, Pearl studied at the Peabody Conservatory of Music, performed with the American Youth Symphony in high school, and with the Longwood Symphony Orchestra. He was Professor of Neurology, Pediatrics, and Music at George Washington University and is currently a member of the Music and Health Institute at Berklee College of Music.

He has presented internationally on the neurological conditions of historical musicians and regularly integrates music into his teaching and public lectures.

His debut CD, Live at Jazzmatazz, was recorded at Blues Alley Jazz Club, with proceeds having supported pediatric care. He is Director of the Music Curriculum of the Neurology Through Art and Time Program of the International Child Neurology Association.

=== Pediatric Epilepsy Syndromes and Classification ===
A central focus of Pearl's work is the classification and characterization of pediatric epilepsy syndromes. His research emphasizes the importance of age-specific syndromic frameworks, clinical-electrographic correlations, and prognosis-based diagnosis. By refining how epilepsy syndromes are identified in neonates, infants, and children, he has helped clinicians better predict disease progression and tailor treatment strategies.

=== Metabolic and Treatable Epilepsies ===
Pearl also identify metabolic and vitamin-responsive epilepsies that are potentially reversible. His research highlights disorders such as pyridoxine-dependent epilepsy and other metabolic abnormalities where early diagnosis can dramatically improve patient outcomes. By promoting metabolic screening and awareness of treatable causes, he has shifted clinical practice toward early intervention, reducing long-term neurological damage in affected children.

=== Genetic and Precision Medicine in Epilepsy ===
Pearl research also focus on precision medicine approaches in epilepsy. His work explores the genetic basis of epilepsy, including mutations affecting ion channels and metabolic pathways. By integrating genomic data into clinical practice, he supports individualized treatment strategies that move beyond symptomatic control toward targeting underlying causes. This research contributes to the broader transformation of epilepsy care into a personalized, mechanism-based discipline.

=== Neurophysiology and EEG-Based Research ===
Pearl has contributed to the use of electroencephalography (EEG) in epilepsy diagnosis and management. His work involves analyzing seizure patterns, identifying biomarkers, and improving pre-surgical evaluations for drug-resistant epilepsy. Through these efforts, he has enhanced the role of EEG as both a diagnostic and prognostic tool, aiding in more precise clinical decision-making.

=== Therapeutic in Epilepsy ===
Pearl's research also encompasses the development and evaluation of therapeutic strategies for epilepsy. He has contributed to pharmacological advancements by studying antiepileptic drugs in pediatric populations, ensuring both safety and efficacy. In addition, he has explored metabolic therapies such as ketogenic diets and their interaction with genetic epilepsies. His work extends to emerging treatments, including gene-based therapies and targeted interventions for inherited metabolic disorders, promoting a multimodal approach to epilepsy care.

=== Rare Neurological Disorders and Orphan Diseases ===
Another important area of Pearl's work involves rare and orphan neurological diseases. Through collaborations with international organizations and research networks, he has contributed to improving the diagnosis and understanding of rare epilepsy syndromes.

=== Translational and Multidisciplinary Research ===
At Boston Children's Hospital, Pearl leads multidisciplinary research that integrates clinical neurology, neuroimaging, genetics, neurosurgery, and neuropsychology.

=== Clinical Practice and Global Neurology ===
Pearl's research has had an impact on both clinical practice and the global neurology community. Clinically, his work has improved early diagnosis of treatable epilepsies, advanced precision medicine, and enhanced neurophysiological evaluation techniques. Academically, he has influenced training programs and contributed to the development of international research standards. Globally, his collaborations have promoted improved epilepsy care and greater awareness of neurological disorders worldwide.

== Personal life ==
Pearl was widowed in 1998 and has been married to Maria Tartaglia Pearl, a pediatrician at Boston Children's Hospital, since 2000. He has four children and five grandchildren.

== Selected publications ==
- Pearl, Phillip L.; Novotny, Edward J.; Acosta, Maria T.; Jakobs, Cornelis; Gibson, K. Michael (2003). "Succinic semialdehyde dehydrogenase deficiency in children and adults". Annals of Neurology. 54 (S6): S73–S80. doi:10.1002/ana.10629. ISSN 0364-5134. PMID 12891657.
- Pearl, P. L.; Gibson, K. M.; Acosta, M. T.; Vezina, L. G.; Theodore, W. H.; Rogawski, M. A.; Novotny, E. J.; Gropman, A.; Conry, J. A.; Berry, G. T.; Tuchman, M. (May 13, 2003). "Clinical spectrum of succinic semialdehyde dehydrogenase deficiency". Neurology. 60 (9): 1413–1417. doi:10.1212/01.wnl.0000059549.70717.80. ISSN 0028-3878. PMID 12743223.
- Stein, Mark A.; Sarampote, Christopher S.; Waldman, Irwin D.; Robb, Adelaide S.; Conlon, Charles; Pearl, Phillip L.; Black, David O.; Seymour, Karen E.; Newcorn, Jeffrey H. (November 1, 2003). "A Dose-Response Study of OROS Methylphenidate in Children With Attention-Deficit/Hyperactivity Disorder". Pediatrics. 112 (5) e404. doi:10.1542/peds.112.5.e404. ISSN 0031-4005. PMID 14595084.
- Pearl, Phillip L.; Vezina, Louis G.; Saneto, Russell P.; McCarter, Robert; Molloy-Wells, Elizabeth; Heffron, Ari; Trzcinski, Stacey; McClintock, William M.; Conry, Joan A.; Elling, Nancy J.; Goodkin, Howard P.; De Menezes, Marcio Sotero; Ferri, Raymond; Gilles, Elizabeth; Kadom, Nadja (2009). "Cerebral MRI abnormalities associated with vigabatrin therapy". Epilepsia. 50 (2): 184–194. doi:10.1111/j.1528-1167.2008.01728.x. ISSN 0013-9580. PMID 18783433.
- Pearl, P. L.; Gibson, K. M.; Quezado, Z.; Dustin, I.; Taylor, J.; Trzcinski, S.; Schreiber, J.; Forester, K.; Reeves-Tyer, P.; Liew, C.; Shamim, S.; Herscovitch, P.; Carson, R.; Butman, J.; Jakobs, C. (August 11, 2009). "Decreased GABA-A binding on FMZ-PET in succinic semialdehyde dehydrogenase deficiency". Neurology. 73 (6): 423–429. doi:10.1212/WNL.0b013e3181b163a5. ISSN 1526-632X. PMC 2727143. PMID 19667317.
- Pearl, Phillip L.; Shamim, Sadat; Theodore, William H.; Gibson, K. Michael; Forester, Katherine; Combs, Susan E.; Lewin, Daniel; Dustin, Irene; Reeves-Tyer, Patricia; Jakobs, Cornelis; Sato, Susumu (2009). "Polysomnographic abnormalities in succinic semialdehyde dehydrogenase (SSADH) deficiency". Sleep. 32 (12): 1645–1648. doi:10.1093/sleep/32.12.1645. ISSN 0161-8105. PMC 2786049. PMID 20041601.
- Okada, Yoshio; Khan, Sheraz; Curran, Ashley; Ahtam, Banu; Hämäläinen, Matti S.; Traub, Roger D.; Pearl, Phillip L. (2020). "Epileptic Activity Intrinsically Generated in the Human Cerebellum". Annals of Neurology. 88 (2): 418–422. doi:10.1002/ana.25779. ISSN 0364-5134. PMID 32421204.
- Tokatly Latzer, Itay; Bertoldi, Mariarita; Blau, Nenad; DiBacco, Melissa L.; Elsea, Sarah H.; García-Cazorla, Àngels; Gibson, K. Michael; Gropman, Andrea L.; Hanson, Ellen; Hoffman, Carolyn; Jeltsch, Kathrin; Juliá-Palacios, Natalia; Knerr, Ina; Lee, Henry H.C.; Malaspina, Patrizia (2024). "Consensus guidelines for the diagnosis and management of succinic semialdehyde dehydrogenase deficiency". Molecular Genetics and Metabolism. 142 (1) 108363. doi:10.1016/j.ymgme.2024.108363. PMC 11073920. PMID 38452608.
- Lee, Henry H. C.; Latzer, Itay Tokatly; Bertoldi, Mariarita; Gao, Guangping; Pearl, Phillip L.; Sahin, Mustafa; Rotenberg, Alexander (2024). "Gene replacement therapies for inherited disorders of neurotransmission: Current progress in succinic semialdehyde dehydrogenase deficiency". Journal of Inherited Metabolic Disease. 47 (3): 476–493. doi:10.1002/jimd.12735. ISSN 0141-8955. PMC 11096052. PMID 38581234.
