= S180 =

Cancer cell line used in research

S180 is a murine Sarcoma cancer cell line. It has been commonly used in cancer research due to its rapid growth and proliferation in mice. The cell line was initially harvested from a soft tissue tumor in a Swiss mouse.
