= KCNQ4 =

Protein-coding gene in humans

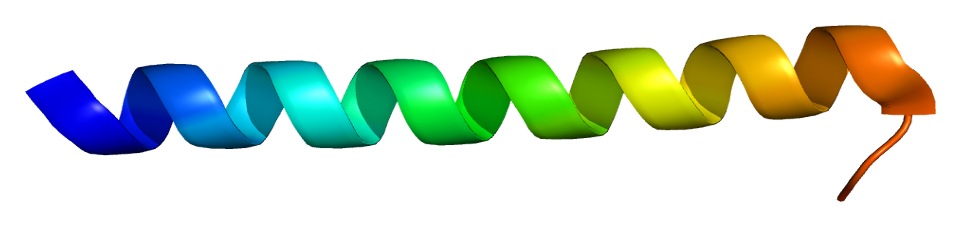

Identifiers
- Aliases: KCNQ4, DFNA2, DFNA2A, KV7.4, potassium voltage-gated channel subfamily Q member 4
- External IDs: OMIM: 603537; MGI: 1926803; GeneCards: KCNQ4
Available structures
PDB	Ortholog search: PDBe RCSB
PDB	List of PDB id codes 2OVC, 4GOW

Gene location (Human)
Chr.	Chromosome 1 (human)
Band	1p34.2	Start	40,783,787 bp
Band	1p34.2	End	40,840,452 bp

Gene location (Mouse)
Chr.	Chromosome 4 (mouse)
Band	4|4 D2.1	Start	120,553,335 bp
Band	4|4 D2.1	End	120,605,809 bp
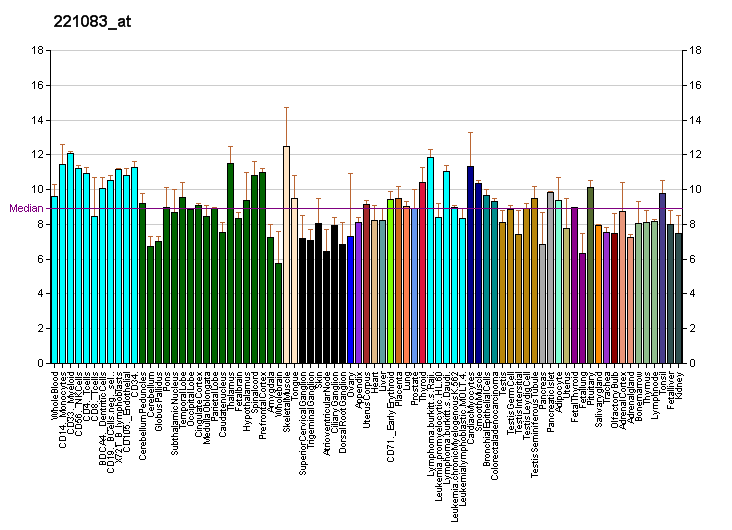
RNA expression pattern
Bgee	Human / Mouse (ortholog); Top expressed in: retinal pigment epithelium; muscle layer of sigmoid colon; right coronary artery; gastric mucosa; parotid gland; popliteal artery; tibial arteries; thoracic aorta; ascending aorta; left coronary artery / Top expressed in: digastric muscle; lumbar spinal ganglion; extraocular muscle; muscle of thigh; knee joint; retinal pigment epithelium; temporal muscle; vastus lateralis muscle; sternocleidomastoid muscle; thoracic diaphragm; More reference expression data
BioGPS	More reference expression data
Gene ontology
Molecular function	potassium channel activity; voltage-gated ion channel activity; ion channel activity; protein binding; voltage-gated potassium channel activity; delayed rectifier potassium channel activity; calmodulin binding
Cellular component	integral component of membrane; membrane; voltage-gated potassium channel complex; plasma membrane; basal plasma membrane
Biological process	regulation of ion transmembrane transport; ion transport; hearing; potassium ion transport; transmembrane transport; potassium ion transmembrane transport; inner ear morphogenesis
Sources:Amigo / QuickGO
Orthologs
Databases	NCBI: entry; OMA: entry
Species	Human	Mouse
Entrez	9132	60613
Ensembl	ENSG00000117013	ENSMUSG00000028631
UniProt	P56696	Q9JK97
RefSeq (mRNA)	NM_004700; NM_172163	NM_001081142
RefSeq (protein)	NP_004691; NP_751895	NP_001074611
Location (UCSC)	Chr 1: 40.78 – 40.84 Mb	Chr 4: 120.55 – 120.61 Mb
PubMed search
- Wikidata
View/Edit Human	View/Edit Mouse

Potassium voltage-gated channel subfamily KQT member 4, also known as voltage-gated potassium channel subunit K_{v}7.4, is a protein that in humans is encoded by the KCNQ4 gene.

== Function ==
The protein encoded by this gene forms a potassium channel that is thought to play a critical role in the regulation of neuronal excitability, particularly in sensory cells of the cochlea. The encoded protein can form a homomultimeric potassium channel or possibly a heteromultimeric channel in association with the protein encoded by the KCNQ3 gene.

== Clinical significance ==
The current generated by this channel is inhibited by muscarinic acetylcholine receptor M1 and activated by retigabine, a novel anti-convulsant drug. Defects in this gene are a cause of nonsyndromic sensorineural deafness type 2 (DFNA2), an autosomal dominant form of progressive hearing loss. Two transcript variants encoding different isoforms have been found for this gene.

== Ligands ==
- ML213: KCNQ2/Q4 channel opener.

== See also ==
- Voltage-gated potassium channel
