= KCNQ5 =

Protein-coding gene in humans

Identifiers
- Aliases: KCNQ5, Kv7.5, potassium voltage-gated channel subfamily Q member 5, MRD46
- External IDs: OMIM: 607357; MGI: 1924937; GeneCards: KCNQ5

Gene location (Human)
Chr.	Chromosome 6 (human)
Band	6q13	Start	72,621,792 bp
Band	6q13	End	73,198,853 bp

Gene location (Mouse)
Chr.	Chromosome 1 (mouse)
Band	1|1 A4	Start	21,468,627 bp
Band	1|1 A4	End	22,032,166 bp
RNA expression pattern
Bgee	Human / Mouse (ortholog); Top expressed in: endothelial cell; pons; Brodmann area 23; tibialis anterior muscle; Skeletal muscle tissue of rectus abdominis; deltoid muscle; quadriceps femoris muscle; Brodmann area 46; vastus lateralis muscle; superior frontal gyrus / Top expressed in: primary motor cortex; olfactory tubercle; nucleus accumbens; piriform cortex; sternocleidomastoid muscle; prefrontal cortex; temporal muscle; globus pallidus; digastric muscle; temporal lobe; More reference expression data
BioGPS	n/a
Gene ontology
Molecular function	ion channel activity; potassium channel activity; protein binding; voltage-gated ion channel activity; voltage-gated potassium channel activity; delayed rectifier potassium channel activity; calmodulin binding
Cellular component	membrane; clathrin coat; integral component of membrane; integral component of plasma membrane; voltage-gated potassium channel complex; plasma membrane
Biological process	potassium ion transport; regulation of ion transmembrane transport; ion transport; transmembrane transport; potassium ion transmembrane transport
Sources:Amigo / QuickGO
Orthologs
Databases	NCBI: entry; OMA: entry
Species	Human	Mouse
Entrez	56479	226922
Ensembl	ENSG00000185760	ENSMUSG00000028033
UniProt	Q9NR82	Q9JK45
RefSeq (mRNA)	NM_001160130; NM_001160132; NM_001160133; NM_001160134; NM_019842	NM_001160139; NM_023872; NM_001310477
RefSeq (protein)	NP_001153602; NP_001153604; NP_001153605; NP_001153606; NP_062816	NP_001153611; NP_001297406; NP_076361
Location (UCSC)	Chr 6: 72.62 – 73.2 Mb	Chr 1: 21.47 – 22.03 Mb
PubMed search
- Wikidata
View/Edit Human	View/Edit Mouse

Potassium voltage-gated channel subfamily KQT member 5 is a protein that in humans is encoded by the KCNQ5 gene.

This gene is a member of the KCNQ potassium channel gene family that is differentially expressed in subregions of the brain and in skeletal muscle. The protein encoded by this gene yields currents that activate slowly with depolarization and can form heteromeric channels with the protein encoded by the KCNQ3 gene. Currents expressed from this protein have voltage dependences and inhibitor sensitivities in common with M-currents. They are also inhibited by M1 muscarinic receptor activation. Three alternatively spliced transcript variants encoding distinct isoforms have been found for this gene, but the full-length nature of only one has been determined.

== Interactions ==
KCNQ5 has been shown to interact with KvLQT3.

== See also ==
- Voltage-gated potassium channel
