= KCNQ2 =

Protein-coding gene in humans

An Error has occurred retrieving Wikidata item for infobox K_{v}7.2 (KvLQT2) is a voltage- and lipid-gated potassium channel protein coded for by the gene KCNQ2.

Mutations in the KCNQ2 gene are dominant autosomally inherited causes of benign familial neonatal epilepsy.

== Function ==
The M channel is a slowly activating and deactivating potassium channel that plays a critical role in the regulation of neuronal excitability. The M channel is formed by the association of the protein encoded by this gene and a related protein encoded by the KCNQ3 gene, both integral membrane proteins. M channel currents are inhibited by M1 muscarinic acetylcholine receptors and activated by retigabine, a novel anti-convulsant drug. Defects in this gene are a cause of benign familial neonatal convulsions type 1 (BFNC), also known as epilepsy, benign neonatal type 1 (EBN1). At least five transcript variants encoding five different isoforms have been found for this gene.

== Ligands ==
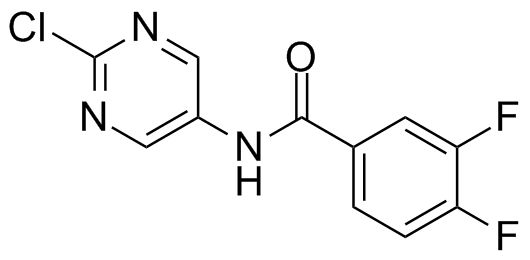
ICA-069673

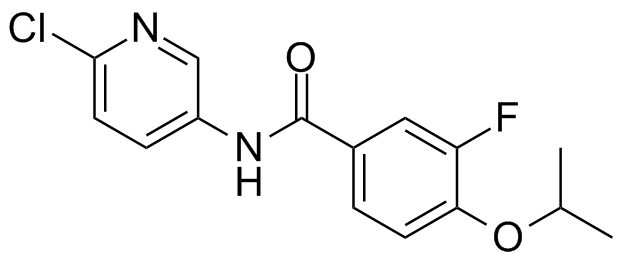
Compound #40 (Amato 2011)

- ICA-069673: channel opener at KCNQ2/Q3, 20-fold selective over KCNQ3/Q5, no measurable activity against a panel of cardiac ion channels (hERG, Nav1.5, L type channels, and KCNQ1) and no activity on GABA_{A} gated channels at 10 μM. A range of related benzamides exhibited activity, of which compound number 40 is shown here.
- ML252: channel inhibitor, IC_{50} = 70nM.
- Phosphatidylinositol 4,5-bisphosphate (PIP_{2})

== See also ==
- KCNQ2 developmental and epileptic encephalopathy
