= Retigabine =

Anticonvulsant, which works as a potassium-channel opener

Clinical data
- Trade names: Trobalt, Potiga
- Other names: D-23129, ezogabine (USAN US)
- AHFS/Drugs.com: Professional Drug Facts
- MedlinePlus: a612028
- License data: EU EMA: by INN; US FDA: Ezogabine
- Routes of administration: By mouth
- ATC code: N03AX21 (WHO)

Legal status
- Legal status: AU: S4 (Prescription only); UK: POM (Prescription only); US: Schedule V

Pharmacokinetic data
- Bioavailability: 60%
- Protein binding: 60–80%
- Metabolism: Liver glucuronidation and acetylation. CYP not involved
- Elimination half-life: 8 hours (mean), range: 7–11 hours
- Excretion: Kidney (84%)

Identifiers
- IUPAC name: Ethyl N-[2-amino-4-[(4-fluorophenyl)methylamino]phenyl]carbamate
- CAS Number: 150812-12-7
- PubChem CID: 121892
- IUPHAR/BPS: 2601
- DrugBank: DB04953
- ChemSpider: 108740
- UNII: 12G01I6BBU
- KEGG: D09569
- ChEMBL: ChEMBL41355
- CompTox Dashboard (EPA): DTXSID40164615
- ECHA InfoCard: 100.158.123

Chemical and physical data
- Formula: C_{16}H_{18}FN_{3}O_{2}
- Molar mass: 303.337 g·mol^{−1}
- 3D model (JSmol): Interactive image
- SMILES: O=C(OCC)Nc1ccc(cc1N)NCc2ccc(F)cc2
- InChI: InChI=1S/C16H18FN3O2/c1-2-22-16(21)20-15-8-7-13(9-14(15)18)19-10-11-3-5-12(17)6-4-11/h3-9,19H,2,10,18H2,1H3,(H,20,21); Key:PCOBBVZJEWWZFR-UHFFFAOYSA-N

Retigabine (INN) or ezogabine (USAN) is an anticonvulsant used as an adjunctive treatment for partial epilepsies in treatment-experienced adult patients. The drug was developed by Valeant Pharmaceuticals and GlaxoSmithKline. It was approved by the European Medicines Agency under the trade name Trobalt on March 28, 2011, and by the United States Food and Drug Administration (FDA), under the trade name Potiga, on June 10, 2011. Production was discontinued in June 2017.

Retigabine works primarily as a potassium channel opener—that is, by activating a certain family of voltage-gated potassium channels in the brain. This mechanism of action is unique among antiepileptic drugs, and may hold promise for the treatment of other neurologic conditions, including tinnitus, migraine and neuropathic pain. The manufacturer withdrew retigabine from clinical use in 2017 due to declining use, after the addition of a black box warning regarding side effects was added to the drug in 2013.

== Adverse effects ==
The adverse effects found in the Phase II trial mainly affected the central nervous system, and appeared to be dose-related. The most common adverse effects were drowsiness, dizziness, tinnitus and vertigo, confusion, and slurred speech. Less common side effects included tremor, memory loss, gait disturbances, and double vision.

In 2013, FDA warned the public that the drug can cause blue skin discoloration and eye abnormalities, characterized by pigment changes in the retina. It was not known whether those changes were reversible at the time. The FDA added a black-box warning to the drug about these issues. Psychiatric symptoms and difficulty urinating were also reported, with most cases occurring in the first 2 months of treatment.

The manufacturer stopped manufacturing retigabine in 2017 due to declining use.

== Interactions ==
Retigabine appears to be free of drug interactions with most commonly used anticonvulsants. It may increase metabolism of lamotrigine (Lamictal), whereas phenytoin (Dilantin) and carbamazepine (CBZ, Tegretol) increase the clearance of retigabine.

Concomitant use of retigabine and digoxin may increase serum concentration of the latter. In vitro studies suggest that the main metabolite of retigabine acts as a P-glycoprotein inhibitor, and may thus increase absorption and reduce elimination of digoxin.

== Pharmacology ==
=== Mechanism of action ===
Retigabine acts as a neuronal KCNQ/Kv7 potassium channel opener, a mechanism of action markedly different from that of any current anticonvulsants. This mechanism of action is similar to that of the chemically similar flupirtine, which is used mainly for its analgesic properties.

The term "channel opener" refers to a shift in the voltage dependence for channel opening towards more negative potentials. This means that KCNQ/Kv7 channels open at more negative potentials in the presence of Retigabine. Recently, it has also been shown that Retigabine stabilizes the open Kv7.2/7.3 channel, making deactivation slower with little change in voltage dependence. This effect of Retigabine is observed at concentrations below 10 micromolar. A similar effect is observed on the homomeric Kv7.2 channel.

=== Pharmacokinetics ===
Retigabine is quickly absorbed, and reaches maximum plasma concentrations between half an hour and 2 hours after a single oral dose. It has a moderately high oral bioavailability (50–60%), a high volume of distribution (6.2 L/kg), and a terminal half-life of 8 to 11 hours. Retigabine requires thrice-daily dosing due to its short half-life.

Retigabine is metabolized in the liver, by N-glucuronidation and acetylation. The cytochrome P450 system is not involved. Retigabine and its metabolites are excreted almost completely (84%) by the kidneys.

== Chemistry ==
=== Analogues ===
Retigabine is a bioisostere of flupirtine in which the pyridine ring has been replaced with a phenyl ring. Azetukalner (encukalner), pynegabine, and fluoxakalner are also analogues of flupirtine and retigabine.

== History ==
Among the newer anticonvulsants, retigabine was one of the most widely studied in the preclinical setting: it was the subject of over 100 published studies before clinical trials began. In preclinical tests, it was found to have a very broad spectrum of activity—being effective in nearly all the animal models of seizures and epilepsy used: retigabine suppresses seizures induced by electroshock, electrical kindling of the amygdala, pentylenetetrazol, kainate, NMDA, and picrotoxin. Researchers hoped this wide-ranging activity would translate to studies in humans as well.

=== Clinical trials ===
In a double-blind, randomized, placebo-controlled Phase II clinical trial, retigabine was added to the treatment regimen of 399 participants with partial seizures that were refractory to therapy with other antiepileptic drugs. The frequency with which seizures occurred was significantly reduced (by 23 to 35%) in participants receiving retigabine, and approximately one fourth to one third of participants had their seizure frequency reduced by more than 50%. Higher doses were associated with a greater response to treatment.

A Phase II trial meant to assess the safety and efficacy of retigabine for treating postherpetic neuralgia was completed in 2009, but failed to meet its primary endpoint. Preliminary results were reported by Valeant as "inconclusive".

=== Regulatory approval ===
The U.S. Food and Drug Administration accepted Valeant's New Drug Application for retigabine on December 30, 2009. The FDA Peripheral and Central Nervous System Drugs Advisory Committee met on August 11, 2010, to discuss the process and unanimously recommended approval of Potiga for the intended indication (add-on treatment of partial seizures in adults). However, the possibility of urinary retention as an adverse effect was considered a significant concern, and the panel's members recommended that some sort of monitoring strategy be used to identify patients at risk of bladder dysfunction. Potiga was approved by the FDA on June 10, 2010, but did not become available on the U.S. market until it had been scheduled by the Drug Enforcement Administration.

In December 2011, the U.S. Drug Enforcement Administration (DEA) placed the substance into Schedule V of the Controlled Substances Act (CSA), the category for substances with a comparatively low potential for abuse. This became effective 15 December 2011.

== Name ==
The International Nonproprietary Name "retigabine" was initially published as being under consideration by WHO in 1996. This was later adopted as the recommended International Nonproprietary Name (rINN) for the drug, and, in 2005 or 2006, the USAN Council—a program sponsored by the American Medical Association, the United States Pharmacopeial Convention, and the American Pharmacists Association that chooses nonproprietary names for drug sold in the United States—adopted the same name. In 2010, however, the USAN Council rescinded its previous decision and assigned "ezogabine" as the United States Adopted Name for the drug. The drug will thus be known as "ezogabine" in the United States and "retigabine" elsewhere.
