= KCNQ3 =

Protein-coding gene in the species Homo sapiens

An Error has occurred retrieving Wikidata item for infobox K_{v}7.3 (KvLQT3) is a potassium channel protein coded for by the gene KCNQ3.

It is associated with benign familial neonatal epilepsy and autism.

The M channel is a slowly activating and deactivating potassium channel that plays a critical role in the regulation of neuronal excitability. The M channel is formed by the association of the protein encoded by this gene and one of two related proteins encoded by the KCNQ2 and KCNQ5 genes, both integral membrane proteins. M channel currents are inhibited by M1 muscarinic acetylcholine receptors and activated by retigabine, a novel anti-convulsant drug. Defects in this gene are a cause of benign familial neonatal convulsions type 2 (BFNC2), also known as epilepsy, benign neonatal type 2 (EBN2).

== Interactions ==
KvLQT3 has been shown to interact with KCNQ5.
