= GTx1-15 =

Toxin from the Chilean tarantula venom

GTx1-15 is a toxin from the Chilean tarantula venom that acts as both a voltage-gated calcium channel blocker and a voltage-gated sodium channel blocker.

== Sources ==
GTx1-15 is derived from the Chilean tarantula species Grammostola rosea and Phrixotrichus scrofa.

== Chemistry ==
=== Sequence ===
GTx1-15 is composed of 34 amino acid residues; its sequence has been determined to be DCLGFMRKCIPDNDKCCRPNLVCSRTHKWCQYVF. This peptide has a molecular weight of approximately 4 kDa and is amidated at its carboxy terminus.

=== Structure and Family ===
GTx1-15 belongs to the GTx1 family, which consists of long loop inhibitor cystine knot (ICK) motif toxins. The GTx1-15 peptide has a conserved structure of six cysteine residues with the characteristic ICK motif, which results in proteolytic, thermal, and chemical stability.

=== Homology ===
GTx1-15 displays sequence homology with other ion channel toxins from several spider species. It is homologous in sequence with sodium channel blocker PaurTx3 by 76.5%, and it also shares similarities in sequence with HnTx-IV (60%), CcoTx2 (55.9%), TLTx1 (55.6%), ω-GrTx SIA (40%), GsAFII (38.2%) and GsMTx2 (38.2%).

== Target and Mode of Action ==
GTx1-15 targets low-voltage activated cation channels. It specifically inhibits:

- T-type calcium channel Ca_{v}3.1
- Sodium channels Na_{v}1. GTx1-15 has a strong inhibitory effect on tetrodotoxin-sensitive (TTX-S) sodium channels (Na_{v}1.7 and Na_{v}1.3), but has a minimal effect on tetrodotoxin-resistant sodium channels (Na_{v}1.5 and Na_{v}1.8).

The mode of action of GTx1-15 has not yet been clarified.

=== IC_{50} ===
The effectiveness of GTx1-15 as a blocker of human cloned Na_{v} and Ca_{v} channels is summarized below:

Channels	IC_{50}
Ca_{v}3.1	0.01 μM
Na_{v}1.7	0.007 μM
Na_{v}1.3	0.12 ± 0.06 μM
Na_{v}1.5	No significant effect (up to 2 μΜ)
Na_{v}1.8	No significant effect (0.93 μM)
