= Double-knot toxin =

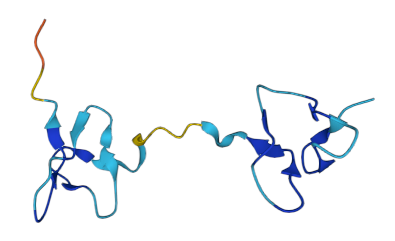

Identifiers
- Organism: Cyriopagopus schmidti
- Symbol: DkTx
- PDB: 5IRX
- UniProt: P0CH43
Search for
- Structures: Swiss-model
- Domains: InterPro

Double-knot toxin (DkTx), also known as Tau-theraphotoxin-Hs1a or Tau-TRTX-Hs1a, is a toxin found in the venom of the Chinese Bird spider (Ornithoctonus huwena or Cyriopagopus schmidti), a tarantula species primarily living in the Guangxi province of China. This toxin, characterized by its bivalent structure of two Inhibitor Cysteine Knots (ICK), is thought to induce excruciating and long-lasting pain by activating the transient receptor potential vanilloid 1 (TRPV1) channel.

== Etymology ==
The name of DkTx is based on its molecular structure, consisting of two ICK segments, connected via a linker.

== Chemistry ==
DkTx can be purified from the venom of the Chinese bird spider Ornithoctonus huwena using reversed-phase chromatography. DkTx is a cysteine-rich peptide; such peptides are difficult to synthesise because of their low folding efficiency. This is why structural and functional information about these peptides is limited. DkTx is a 75-amino-acid-peptide consisting of two independently folded head-to-tail ICK domains, which are linked together via a seven amino acid long linker peptide. This compact and rigid structure provides the toxin with a high affinity to bind to its target channel. The linker provides the separation of the two knots and allows them to dock to the channel binding sites concomitantly. The two ICK-motifs are referred to as K1 and K2, and each of them consists of six cysteine residues. For this reason, DkTx is part of the ICK peptide family; however its DNA sequence diverges from other ICK peptides, such as the vanillotoxins, huwentoxins or hanatoxin.

== Target ==
DkTx is a specific TRPV1 receptor agonist and acts as a bivalent ligand, which gives it high affinity to its target. The TRPV1 channel is a member of the group of TRP ion channels, which are all known to be responsible for sensory signaling, such as mechanosensation, thermoception, and nociception. TRPV1 itself is a nonselective cation channel located in the plasma membrane of nociceptive dorsal root ganglions. It can be activated in several ways, such as by noxious heat, capsaicin, extracellular proteins, and other inflammatory agents. However, binding locations can differ, e.g., capsaicin does not bind to the outer pore region but to the S3-S4 region of the channel.

The potency of this toxin binding to the TRPV1 channel, as quantified with the half maximal effective concentration (EC_{50}) of DkTx is 0.23 μM. Owing to its bivalent structure, this potency is much higher compared to single K1 and K2 motifs or other vanillotoxins binding to the TRPV1 channel.

Vanillotoxins (VaTx, or Vanilloids) are toxins that are TRPV1 agonists that target the channel on its outer pore region. For this reason, DkTx is considered a vanillotoxin. Different from the reversible interaction of the other three VaTx toxins (VaTx1, VaTx2 and VaTx3), binding of DkTx is irreversible and inflicts persistent TRPV1 channel activity.

== Mode of action ==
The bird spider O. huwena produces a large amount of toxins which, although often characterized by the presence of ICK motifs, widely differ in their mode of action. Molecularly, the toxin specifically targets the TRPV1 receptor on the outer edge of the outer pore region of the channel. After binding, DkTx will interact with the membrane and insert its hydrophobic residues into the membrane by forming a complex consisting of the membrane and the toxin, which consequently will lock the TRPV1 channel in the open state.

== Toxicity ==
Upon binding, the toxin is suggested to induce a prolonged sensation of severe pain, accompanied with neurogenic inflammation due to enduring TRPV1 activation. However, specific behavioural effects remain unknown. In line with the isolated toxin effect, the toxic effects of the crude venom are reported to be mainly nociceptive and inflammatory, but not lethal.
