= Heteroscodratoxin-1 =

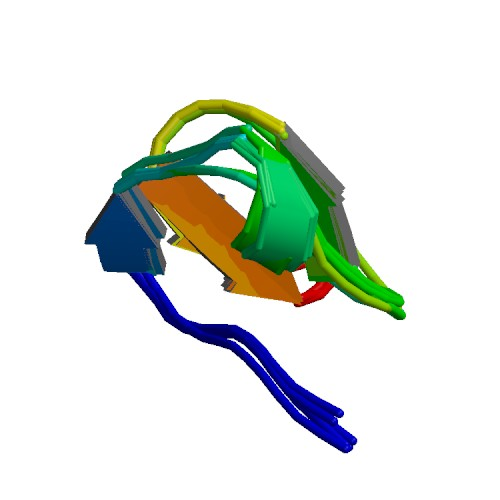
- Schematic diagram of the three-dimensional structure of Heteroscodratoxin-1.

Identifiers
- Organism: Heteroscodra maculata
- Symbol: N/A
- UniProt: P60992
Search for
- Structures: Swiss-model
- Domains: InterPro

Heteroscodratoxin-1 (also known as κ-theraphototoxin-Hm1a, κ-TRTX-Hm1a, δ-theraphotoxin-Hm1a, δ-TRTX-Hm1a, Hm1a or HmTx1) is a neurotoxin produced by the venom glands of Heteroscodra maculata (Togo starburst tarantula) that shifts the activation threshold of voltage-gated potassium channels and the inactivation of Nav1.1 sodium channels to more positive potentials.

== Sources ==
Heteroscodratoxin-1 can be obtained from venom glands of Heteroscodra maculata (Togo starburst tarantula or Togo starburst baboon spider).

== Chemistry ==
Heteroscodratoxin-1 is a basic protein (isoelectric point of 7.7) composed of 35 amino acids with a carboxylated C-terminus. Its sequence shows strong similarity with other tarantula toxins such as scodratoxin, hanatoxin and SGTx1. Structurally the protein belongs to the huwentoxin-1 family of inhibitory spider peptides based on its knottin backbone that consists of three crossing disulfide bridges (Cys1-Cys4/Cys2-Cys5/Cys3-Cys6). Hm1a has the following amino acid sequence: ECRYLFGGCSSTSDCCKHLSCRSDWKYCAWDGTFS. Its molecular weight is 3,995.61 Da.

== Target ==
Heteroscodratoxin-1 inhibits subtypes of both delayed rectifier (K_{V}2.1 and K_{V}2.2) and A-type rapidly inactivating (K_{V}4.1, K_{V}4.2 and K_{V}4.3) voltage-gated potassium channels. At a concentration of 100-300 nM, in transfected COS cells it blocks 23% of K_{V}2.1, 19% of K_{V}2.2, 50% of K_{V}4.1, 39% of K_{V}4.2, and 43% of K_{V}4.3 conductance at a potential of 0 mV. No significant effect on other A-type rapidly inactivating (K_{V}1.4 and K_{V}3.4) or delayed rectifier potassium channels (K_{V}1.1, K_{V}1.2, K_{V}1.3, K_{V}1.5, K_{V}1.6, K_{V}1.2/ K_{V}1.5, or K_{V}LQT1), or on sodium and calcium channels has been observed.

Physiologically probably more important than its action on potassium channels is its action on the voltage-gated sodium channel Na_{v}1.1 (EC50 = 38 ± 6 nM). More specifically, it is thought that Hm1a targets the domain IV S3-S4 loop and the S1-S2 loop of Na_{v}1.1, as application of this toxin to a chimeric channel which contained these regions resulted in full toxin sensitivity (compared to other chimeric channels which contained only one of either of these regions). This, therefore, indicates that both the S1-S2 and the S3-S4 domains determine toxin sensitivity and selectivity.

Hm1a enhances the Na_{v}1.1 channel activity by inhibiting fast and slow inactivation of the channel. Hm1a prevents the movement of the voltage sensor domain IV. Hm1a and Hm1b prevent the movement of the sensor domain towards the inner part of the cell thereby inhibiting fast inactivation of the Na_{v}1.1 channel. Hm1a also inhibits the slow inactivation of the Na_{v}1.1 channel by preventing a current reduction in the ion channel, but the underlying mechanism has not yet been elucidated.

== Mode of action ==
It is thought that heteroscodratoxin-1 modifies gating of specific potassium channels by shifting the activation threshold to more positive values. As a result larger depolarizations are needed to open channels. The mechanism underlying this modification has been largely elucidated using molecular docking simulation for the K_{V}2.1 potassium channel which is highly expressed in mammalian neurons and interacts strongly with heteroscodratoxin-1. In this model the C-terminal residue of the K_{V}2.1 S3-segment (S3_{C}) serves as a binding site for Hmtx-1 forming both hydrophobic and hydrophilic bonds. Interaction between the toxin and the potassium channel induces a helical movement of S3_{C} resulting in limited spatial freedom of the S4-segment which is responsible for channel gating.

== Toxicity ==
Information on toxic effects of Heteroscodratoxin-1 in humans is not available. In mice, however, it has been found that intracerebroventricular injection of 500 pmol HmTx1 induces convulsions, spasms, tremors and death within 1 hour. At 100 pmol, a less severe response develops, although death still occurs after 2 hours.
