= TLTx =

Theraphosa leblondi toxin (TLTx) is a toxin occurring in three different forms (subtypes) that are purified and sequenced from the venom of the giant tarantula Theraphosa blondi. This toxin selectively inhibits Kv4.2 voltage-gated potassium channels by acting as a gating modifier.

== Chemistry ==
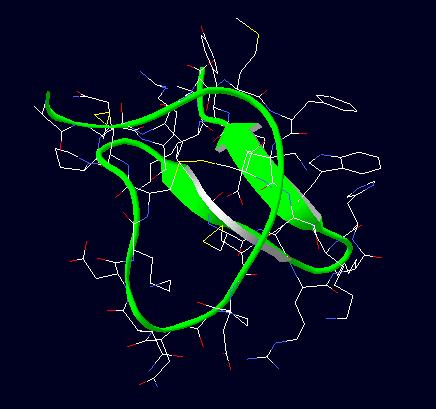
3D-structure of TLTx1 (PDB file downloaded from Swiss Model Repository)

TLTx is part of the family of Kv4-specific tarantula toxins, which are short peptides with a disulfide-bonded core domain. Other members of this family are heteropodatoxins and phrixotoxins.

Three homologous peptides (TLTx1, 2 and 3) have been isolated from the venom of the tarantula. They consist of 35 amino acids, with a mass of <5 kDa. They form a total of 3 disulfide bonds between the side chains of cysteine, of which the positions in the sequence are identical in all subtypes of the toxin. The homology with other tarantula toxins suggests that TLTx also forms an inhibitor cystine knot (ICK) motif.

Disulfide bonds between cysteine side chains in the amino acid sequence of TLTx1

== Target ==
The main difference between the three TLTx subtypes is their affinity for the Kv4.2 voltage-dependent potassium channel. TLTx1 has the highest affinity with an IC50 of 193 nM, followed by TLTx2 with an IC50 of about 800 nM. For TLTx3 the IC50 has not been measured.

== Mode of action ==
TLTx1 acts as a gating modifier on Kv4.2 channels. TLTx1 shifts the voltage dependence of activation of Kv4.2 channels to more positive potentials, slows its activation and speeds up its deactivation kinetics. Additionally, TLTx decreases their rate of inactivation. The binding site that TLTx most likely interacts with is the linker region between the transmembrane segments S3 and S4. In addition, the S1-S2 and S5-S6 loops may also play a role.

== Toxicity ==
By blocking the transient Kv4.2 potassium channels, TLTx may interfere with action potential repolarisation, leading to prey paralysis. No fatal episodes have been reported for humans.
