= Hadrucalcin =

Peptide toxin from the venom of the scorpion Hadrurus gertschi

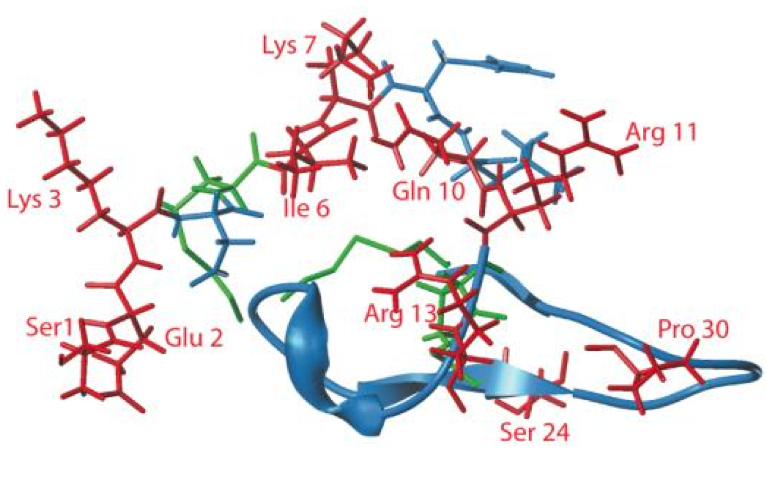
Modeled 3D structure of Hadrucalcin

Hadrucalcin is a peptide toxin from the venom of the scorpion Hadrurus gertschi. Hadrucalcin modifies the Ryanodine receptor channels RyR1 and RyR2, found in the sarcoplasmic reticulum, to a long-lasting subconductance state, thus inducing the release of calcium from the sarcoplasmic reticulum.

== Source and etymology ==
Hadrucalcin (HdCa, alternative spelling: Hadrucalcine) is obtained from the venom gland of the scorpion Hadrurus gertschi, endemic to Guerrero, Mexico. Hadrucalcin is named after the scorpion that produces the peptide and its similarity to other toxins of the scorpion calcin family.

== Chemistry ==
Hadrucalcin is a peptide toxin from the scorpion calcin family. The mature hadrucalcin peptide is composed of 35 amino acids, whereas other members of the scorpion calcin family are composed of 33 amino acids. Based on the high degree of sequence similarity with maurocalcin, it is predicted that hadrucalcin folds along an inhibitor cystine knot motif, with disulfide bonds between positions 5 and 19, 12 and 23 and 18 and 34 of the mature peptide. Hadrucalcin has a molecular weight of 4190.5 Da. The most notable difference between hadrucalcin and other members of the scorpion calcin family is that hadrucalcin lacks two positive charged lysine residues (at positions 8 and 22 in other scorpion calcine toxins), that were previously thought to be important for affinity with RyR1. Instead, Hadrucalcin has two Lysine residues at positions 3 and 7 of the mature peptide, near the otherwise neutral N-terminal, resulting in a relatively low degree of amphiphilicity.

Linear amino acid sequence of mature Hadrucalcin (HdCa) and Maurocalcin (MCa)
	01	02	03	04	05	06	07	08	09	10	11	12	13	14	15	16	17	18	19	20	21	22	23	24	25	26	27	28	29	30	21	32	33	34	35
HdCa	S	E	K	D	C	I	K	H	L	Q	R	C	R	E	N	K	D	C	C	S	K	K	C	S	R	R	G	T	N	P	E	K	R	C	R
MCa			G	D	C	L	P	H	L	K	L	C	K	E	N	K	D	C	C	S	K	K	C	K	R	R	G	T	N	I	E	K	R	C	R
			01	02	03	04	05	06	07	08	09	10	11	12	13	14	15	16	17	18	19	20	21	22	23	24	25	26	27	28	29	30	21	32	33

== Target and Mode of Action ==
Hadrucalcin targets ryanodine receptor channels RyR1 and RyR2, found in the sarcoplasmic reticulum of skeletal muscle cells and cardiac muscle cells respectively. By inducing a long-lasting subconductance state in RyR1 (35% of full conductance) and RyR2 (50% of full conductance), hadrucalcin increases the total ion flow over these channels. Within a few seconds, hadrucalcin is able to permeate the cell membrane of ventricular myocytes and induce the release of calcium from the sarcoplasmic reticulum. Despite functional effects on both channels, hadrucalcin only enhances the binding of ryanodine to RyR1 (EC50 = 37.8nM Hadrucalcin), but not to RyR2, suggesting the binding sites for hadrucalcin are structurally different in RyR1 and RyR2. The exact interacting sites of hadrucalcin on the ryanodine receptors are unknown.

== Therapeutic Use ==
Maurocalcin is the first proven example of a scorpion toxin that can act as a vector for large compounds. Hadrucalcin appears to be an even more potent cell penetrating peptide. A Hadrucalcin derivative has been used as a carrier for nanobiosensors.
