= Psalmotoxin =

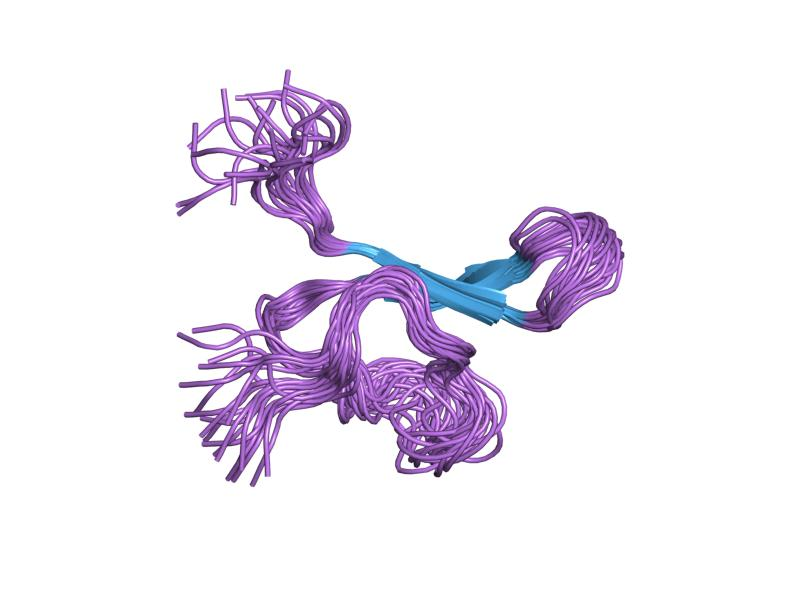

Identifiers
- Organism: Psalmopoeus cambridgei
- Symbol: PcTx1
- PDB: 1lmm
- UniProt: P60514
Search for
- Structures: Swiss-model
- Domains: InterPro

Psalmotoxin (PcTx1) is a spider toxin from the venom of the Trinidad tarantula Psalmopoeus cambridgei. It selectively blocks Acid Sensing Ion Channel 1-a (ASIC1a), which is a proton-gated sodium channel.

== Sources ==
Psalmotoxin is a toxin produced in the venom glands of the South American tarantula Psalmopoeus cambridgei.

== Chemistry ==
The psalmotoxin structure can be classified as an inhibitor cystine knot (ICK) protein. Many ion channel effectors from snail, spider, and scorpion venoms share a similar ICK structure, although they possess very different pharmacological profiles. Among ICK toxins, psalmotoxin is the only peptide known to act on homomeric ASIC1 channels.

Psalmotoxin is a 40-amino acid peptide, possessing 6 cysteines linked by three disulfide bridges. The three-dimensional structure consists of a compact disulfide-bonded core from which three loops and the N and C termini emerge. The main element of the structure is a three-stranded antiparallel β-sheet.

== Target ==
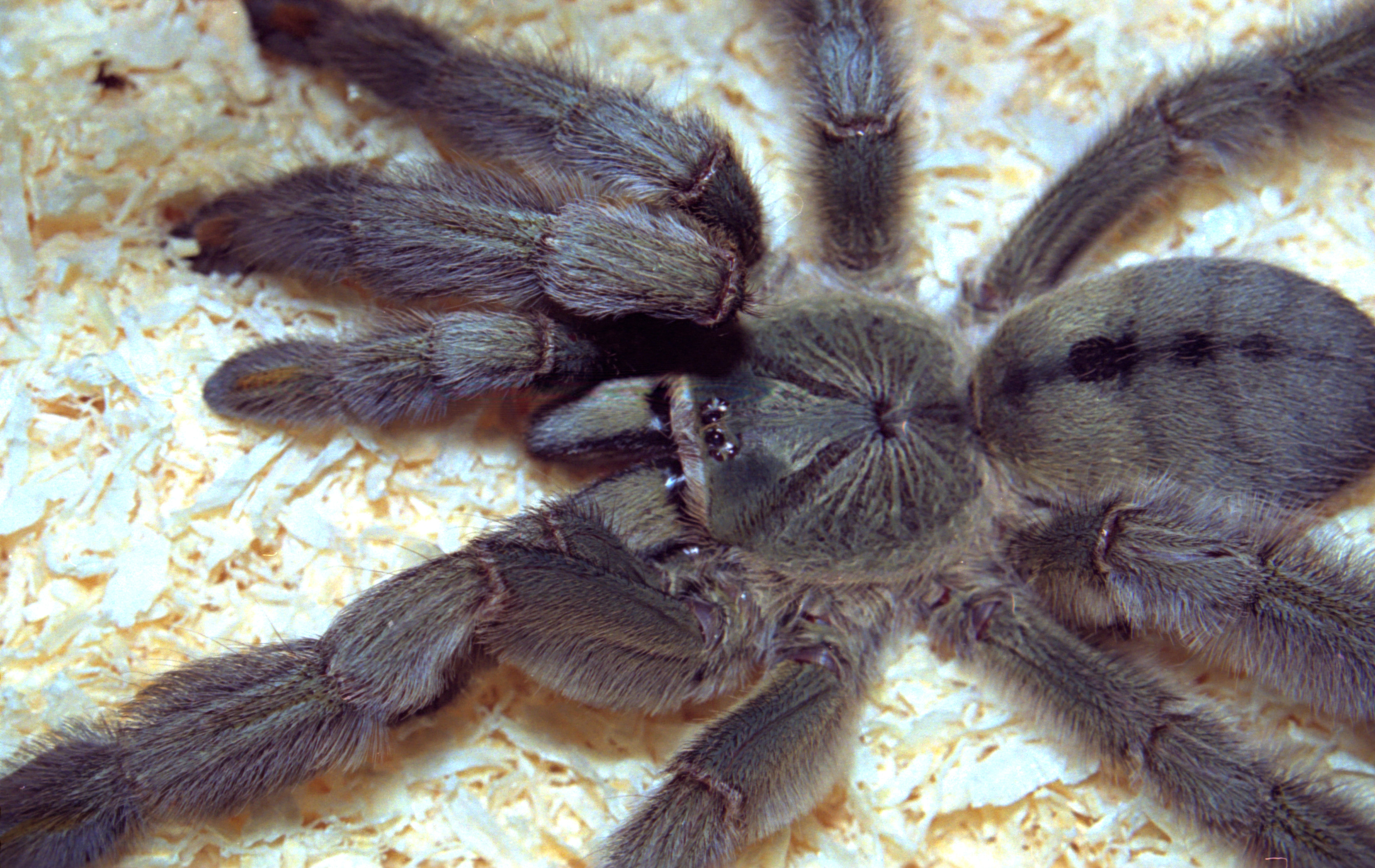
Psalmopoeus cambridgei, subadult

Psalmotoxin can bind to a particular isoform of the Acid Sensing Ion Channel, the Acid Sensing Ion Channel 1 (ASIC1). The binding of psalmotoxin has an effect on both of the two splice variants known of ASIC1, ASIC1a and ASIC1b. ASIC1 has two transmembrane components. After the first transmembrane component it forms a large extracellular bridge with the second transmembrane component, an extracellular loop. This extracellular loop contains cysteine rich domains. Psalmotoxin specifically binds these cysteine rich domains in the extracellular loop of ASIC1. This implicates this domain is the receptor site of ASIC1 for psalmotoxin.

ASICs are proton-gated sodium channels. ASICs open when H^{+} binds. This occurs when the H^{+}-concentration in the environment of the neuron is slightly higher compared to resting H^{+}-concentrations (pH = 7.4).

The expression of ASIC1a is high in both the central nervous system and in the sensory neurons of the dorsal root ganglia. ASIC1b is only expressed in sensory neurons. Expression of ASIC1a in the central nervous system relates to the involvement of ASIC1a in higher brain functions, such as learning, memory and fear conditioning. Expression of ASIC1a and ASIC1b in sensory neurons relates to their involvement in nociception and taste.

== Mode of action ==
Binding of psalmotoxin to ASIC1a is reported to increase the affinity of ASIC1a for H^{+}. This increase in affinity for H^{+} results in the shift of ASIC1a into the desensitized state at resting H^{+}-concentrations (pH = 7.4). The channel being desensitized means that the ion channel is bound to its ligand, H^{+}, but is not able to let ions pass through the ion channel. The underlying mechanism of how this increase in affinity for H^{+} accounts for a shift of the ASIC1a channels into the desensitized state is not yet specified.

Psalmotoxin also interacts with ASIC1b. In contrast to psalmotoxin binding to ASIC1a, binding of psalmotoxin to ASIC1b results in promoting the opening of the channel. This agonistic effect of psalmotoxin on ASIC1b only occurs in slightly acidic conditions (pH = 7.1).

== Toxicity ==
The role of psalmotoxin in prey capture and the importance of ASIC1a channels as targets of venom components remains unclear.

== Therapeutic uses ==
Psalmotoxin is currently not used for therapeutic purposes, but understanding the psalmotoxin/ASIC1a interaction may be of therapeutic value. Recently, it has been shown that activation of ASIC1a during the acidosis accompanying brain ischemia leads to significant Ca^{2+} influx, which contributes to neuronal cell death. Inhibition of ASIC1a by psalmotoxin significantly decreased ischemic neuronal cell death. Therefore, it is suggested that desensitized ASIC1's by pharmacological intervention could be beneficial for patients at risk of having a stroke. For the same reasons, psalmotoxin could contribute in the search for a cure for gliomas. Inhibition of ASIC1a in the amygdala by psalmotoxin could have an anxiolytic effect. As ASIC's play a role in nociception, psalmotoxin could be helpful in designing new analgesic drugs acting directly against pain at the nociceptor level.

== See also ==
- Vanillotoxin
