= Grammotoxin =

Toxin

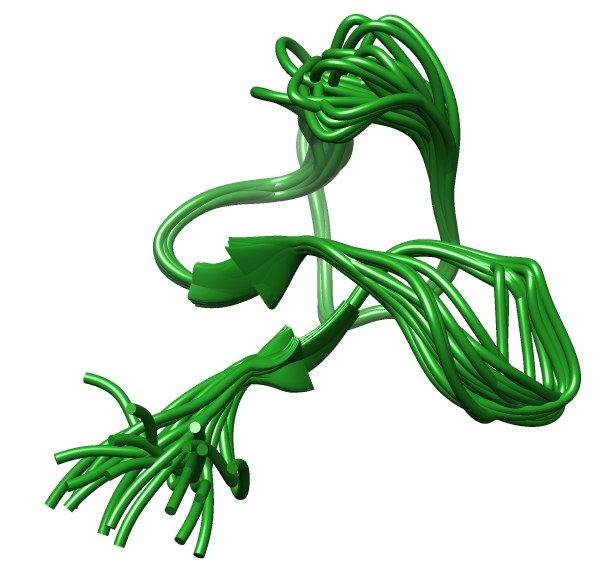
Solution structure of omega-grammotoxin SIA. PDB entry 1koz

Grammotoxin is a toxin in the venom of the tarantula Grammostola spatulata. It is a protein toxin that inhibits P-, Q- and N-type voltage-gated calcium channels (Ca ^{2+} channels) in neurons. Grammotoxin is also known as omega-grammotoxin SIA.

== Chemistry ==
Grammotoxin is a 36 amino acid protein toxin, with the sequence Asp-Cys-Val-Arg-Phe-Trp-Gly-Lys-Cys-Ser-Gln-Thr-Ser-Asp-Cys-Cys-Pro-His-Leu-Ala-Cys-Lys-Ser-Lys-Trp-Pro-Arg-Asn-Ile-Cys-Val-Trp-Asp-Gly-Ser-Val (DCVRFWGKCSQTSDCCPHLACKSKWPRNICVWDGSV), and disulfide bridges between Cys2-Cys16, Cys9-Cys21 and Cys15-Cys30.

It forms an inhibitor cystine knot motif, common in spider toxins.

Its chemical formula is: C_{177}H_{268}N_{52}O_{50}S_{6}

Grammotoxin can be purified from Grammostola spatulata venom by reverse phase high performance liquid chromatography.

== Mode of action ==
The toxin binding site on the channels has high affinity for the toxins when they are closed and low affinity when channels are activated. As a result, the toxin preferentially binds to the closed channels. It binds at a region which contains the voltage-sensing domains. When bound, the toxin makes it more difficult for channels to be opened by depolarization, so much larger depolarizations are required for channel activation. Grammotoxin also binds to potassium channels but with lower affinity than to the calcium channels.
