= C. striatus =

C. striatus may refer to:

- Conus striatus, the striated cone, a sea snail species
- Cyathus striatus, the fluted bird's nest, a common saprobic fungus species with a widespread distribution throughout temperate regions of the world
- Cytisus striatus, the Portuguese broom, a flowering plant species native to the Iberian Peninsula
- Cordaticaris striatus, a species of radiodont, a type of stem-group arthropod, from the middle Cambrian of China
