= Spider toxin =

Family of toxins produced by spiders

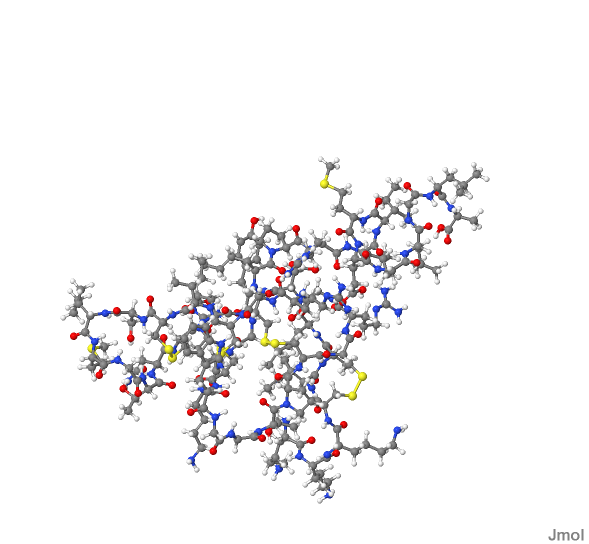
- Solution structure of omega-agatoxin-Aa4a from Agelenopsis aperta.

Identifiers
- Symbol: Toxin_9
- Pfam: PF02819
- Pfam clan: CL0083
- InterPro: IPR004169
- SCOP2: 1oav / SCOPe / SUPFAM
- OPM superfamily: 112
- OPM protein: 1agg
Available protein structures:
- PDB: IPR004169 PF02819 (ECOD; PDBsum)
- AlphaFold: IPR004169; PF02819

Delta Atracotoxin

Identifiers
- Symbol: Atracotoxin
- Pfam: PF05353
- InterPro: IPR008017
- SCOP2: 1qdp / SCOPe / SUPFAM
- OPM protein: 1vtx
Available protein structures:
- PDB: IPR008017 PF05353 (ECOD; PDBsum)
- AlphaFold: IPR008017; PF05353

Spider toxin CSTX family

Identifiers
- Symbol: Toxin_35
- Pfam: PF10530
- InterPro: IPR011142
- PROSITE: PDOC60029
Available protein structures:
- PDB: IPR011142 PF10530 (ECOD; PDBsum)
- AlphaFold: IPR011142; PF10530

Spider potassium channel inhibitory toxin

Identifiers
- Symbol: Toxin_12
- Pfam: PF07740
- Pfam clan: CL0083
- InterPro: IPR011696
- SCOP2: 1d1h / SCOPe / SUPFAM
- OPM superfamily: 112
- OPM protein: 1qk6
Available protein structures:
- PDB: IPR011696 PF07740 (ECOD; PDBsum)
- AlphaFold: IPR011696; PF07740

Spider toxins are a family of proteins produced by spiders which function as neurotoxins. The mechanism of many spider toxins is through blockage of calcium channels.

A remotely related group of atracotoxins operate by opening sodium channels. Delta atracotoxin from the venom of the Sydney funnel-web spider produces potentially fatal neurotoxic symptoms in primates by slowing the inactivation of voltage-gated sodium channels. The structure of atracotoxin comprises a core beta region containing a triple-stranded a thumb-like extension protruding from the beta region and a C-terminal helix. The beta region contains a cystine knot motif, a feature seen in other neurotoxic polypeptides and other spider toxins, of the CSTX family.

Spider potassium channel inhibitory toxins is another group of spider toxins. A representative of this group is hanatoxin, a 35 amino acid peptide toxin which was isolated from Chilean rose tarantula (Grammostola rosea, syn. G. spatulata) venom. It inhibits the drk1 voltage-gated potassium channel by altering the energetics of gating. See also Huwentoxin-1.

== See also ==
- Raventoxin
