= Phrixotoxin =

Toxin in venom of Phrixotrichus auratus

Phrixotoxin-1
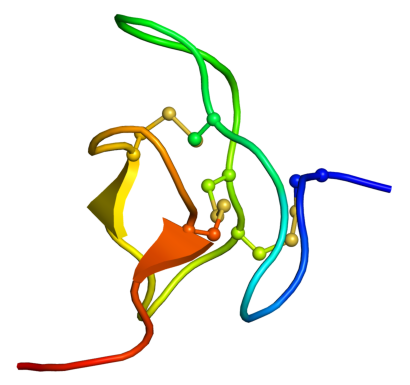
- Structure of Phrixotoxin-1, determined by NMR

Identifiers
- Organism: Phrixotrichus auratus
- Symbol: PaTX1
- PDB: 1v7f
- UniProt: P61230
Search for
- Structures: Swiss-model
- Domains: InterPro

Phrixotoxin-2

Identifiers
- Organism: Phrixotrichus auratus
- Symbol: PaTX2
- UniProt: P61231
Search for
- Structures: Swiss-model
- Domains: InterPro

Phrixotoxin-3

Identifiers
- Organism: Phrixotrichus auratus
- Symbol: PaurTx3
- UniProt: P84510
Search for
- Structures: Swiss-model
- Domains: InterPro

Phrixotoxins are peptide toxins derived from the venom of the Chilean copper tarantula Phrixotrichus auratus, also named Paraphysa scrofa. Phrixotoxin-1 and -2 block A-type voltage-gated potassium channels; phrixotoxin-3 blocks voltage-gated sodium channels. Similar toxins are found in other species, for instance the Chilean rose tarantula.

== Sources ==
Phrixotoxins are purified from the venom of the spider Phrixotrichus auratus (Diochot 1999), but they can also be produced by chemical peptide synthesis (Chagot 2004).

== Structure ==
There are three different phrixotoxins:

- Phrixotoxin-1 (PaTx1) – which is composed of 29 amino acids
- Phrixotoxin-2 (PaTx2) – which is composed of 31 amino acids
- Phrixotoxin-3 (PaurTx3 or Beta-theraphotoxin-Ps1a) – which is composed of 34 amino acids

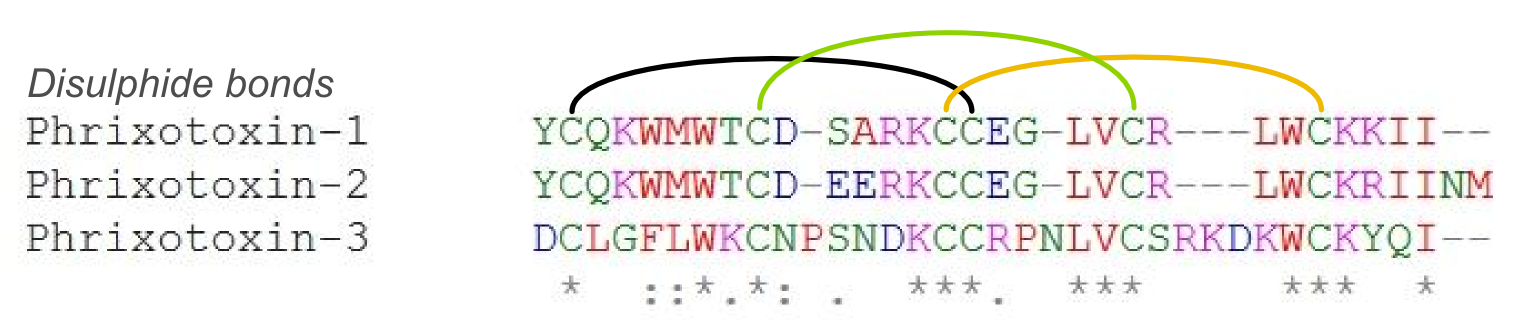
Primary sequence and disulphide bond pattern of the phrixotoxins

PaTx1 is 83.3% identical to PATx2, differing only by two acidic residues(Chagot 2004)(Diochot 1999). Phrixotoxin-1 and -2 are similar to heteropodatoxin, which also has a blocking activity on Kv4.2 channels (Chagot 2004).

Phrixotoxin-1, -2 and -3 contain an Inhibitor Cystine Knot (ICK) motif, and thus belong to the ICK peptide family(Chagot 2004)(Bosmans 2006).

== Target ==
Phrixotoxin-1 and -2 bind to A-type, transient, voltage-gated potassium channels, near the S3 and S4 segments, where they negatively affect transmembrane movement of the voltage sensing domain in response to depolarizing voltages. They bind preferentially to the closed or inactivated state of Kv4.2 and Kv4.3 channels(Chagot 2004).

Phrixotoxin-3 (PaurTx3) inhibits several voltage gated sodium channel subtypes (Nav1.1/SCN1A, Nav1.2/SCN2A, Nav1.4/SCN4A, Nav1.5/SCN5A, and Nav1.8/SCN10A) (Bosmans 2006).

== Mode of action ==
Phrixotoxins 1 and 2 specifically block Kv4.2 and Kv4.3 channels by altering the voltage-dependent gating properties of these channels. Inhibition results from a shift of the conductance-voltage relation and steady-state inactivation properties to more depolarized potentials. These toxins also change Kv4.2 and Kv4.3 kinetics of activation and inactivation by a concentration-dependent increase of the time-to-peak current and time constant of current inactivation (Diochot 1999).

Phrixotoxin-3 modulates voltage-gated sodium channels by causing a depolarizing shift in gating kinetics and by blocking the inward component of sodium current, thus preventing the channels from opening to a moderate depolarization, resulting in a reduced firing rate of the neurons (Bosmans 2006).

== Toxicity ==
=== Phrixotoxin-1 ===
Mice that are injected with phrixotoxin-1 can experience numerous, transient, adverse cardiac reactions, such as premature ventricular beats, ventricular tachycardia, and atrio-ventricular blocks. Neurological effects observed are motor impairment and convulsions. These effects are seen following both intravenous and intracisternal injection, making it likely that phrixotoxin-1 crosses the blood brain barrier (Diochot 1999).

=== Phrixotoxin-3 ===
Injection of this venom into mice causes immediate general ataxia, lack to response stimuli and semi-paralysis. Inability to stand and breathing reduction occurs within minutes. Flaccid paralysis and slowing of breathing eventually cause death (Bosmans 2006).
