= Coremiocnemis valida =

Scientific classification
- Kingdom: Animalia
- Phylum: Arthropoda
- Subphylum: Chelicerata
- Class: Arachnida
- Order: Araneae
- Infraorder: Mygalomorphae
- Family: Theraphosidae
- Genus: Coremiocnemis
- Species: C. valida

Binomial name
- Coremiocnemis valida Pocock, 1895

Synonyms
- Coremiocnemis validus

Species of spider

Coremiocnemis valida (also known as Coremiocnemis validus), commonly known as the Singapore tarantula, is a species of tarantula found in tropical forests in Southeast Asia. It is known to create burrows underground.

Covalitoxin-II was originally isolated from C. valida.
