= Hanatoxin =

Toxin found in tarantula venom

SCOP classification
- Class: Small proteins
- Fold: Knottins (small inhibitors, toxins, lectins)
- Superfamily: omega toxin-like
- Family: Spider toxins
- Protein: Hanatoxin (HaTx, HaTx_{1}, HaTx_{2}, κ-TRTX-Gr1a)

Hanatoxin is a toxin found in the venom of the Grammostola spatulata tarantula. The toxin is mostly known for inhibiting the activation of voltage-gated potassium channels, most specifically Kv4.2 and Kv2.1, by raising its activation threshold.

== Sources ==
Hanatoxin is a spider toxin from the venom of Grammostola spatulata.

== Chemistry ==
Hanatoxin is the common name for two 4.1 kDa protein toxins, HaTx_{1} and HaTx_{2}, which are similar in structure. HaTx is a peptide consisting of the following 35 amino-acids:

Glu-Cys-Arg-Tyr-Leu-Phe-Gly-Gly-Cys-Lys-Thr-Thr-***-Asp-Cys-Cys-Lys-His-Leu-Gly-Cys-Lys-Phe-Arg-Asp-Lys-Tyr-Cys-Ala-Trp-Asp-Phe-Thr-Phe-Ser

where *** is Ser for HaTx_{1} and Ala for HaTx_{2}. First discovered in 1995, the difference in amino-acids and structure compared to other toxins known at that time has made hanatoxin the founding member of a family of spider toxins which inhibit voltage-gated potassium channels by modifying the voltage-sensor. Its amino-acid sequence is homologous to various other toxins, including SGTx1 (76%) and grammotoxin (43%), both of which have similar gating-modification properties as hanatoxin.

== Target ==
Hanatoxin binds to several types of voltage-gated ion channels. While the affinity is the highest for the Kv2.1 and Kv4.2 channels, it has been shown that the toxin may also bind to α_{1A} voltage-gated Ca^{2+} channels. Hanatoxin binds to the S3-S4 link of K^{+} channel-subunits, specifically the S3b segment, and may bind to multiple subunits in a single ion channel.

== Mode of action ==
Similar to α-scorpion toxins, Hanatoxin inhibits – but does not block – the activation of, primarily, voltage-gated potassium channels. The S3-S4 link, where hanatoxin binds, is important for voltage-sensing and gate activation. By binding to the S3b segment, the S3b segment is pushed to the N-terminus of the S4 segment, restricting movement and, therefore, requiring a higher depolarization for channel-activation.

== Toxicity ==
While the effects of hanatoxin on its own are not thoroughly studied, it is part of the venom of Grammostola spatulata, which is considered slightly venomous to humans. The tarantula venom causes localized pain, itching and burning and does not seem to have any long-term effects on humans. However, it is possible to have an allergic reaction to the venom, which could cause anaphylaxis, breathing problems and chest pains. The venom is lethal to smaller animals like mice: 0.1 ml of the venom is lethal to mice within about 5 minutes.

== Treatment ==
The bite of Grammostola spatulata should be treated as a regular puncture wound. Washing and cleaning of the area is required and, if the reaction to the poison is too extreme, hospitalization and / or specialized medication may be required. Recovery from the bite usually takes about a week.

== Therapeutic use ==
Due to its specificity for particular ion-channels, hanatoxin has been recognized as a candidate for therapeutic drug development. The potassium channels that hanatoxin inhibits have huge diversity and are involved in a number of functions such as regulation of heart rate, insulin injection and muscle contraction. One of the most promising therapeutic uses of hanatoxin is treatment of type-2 diabetes, by helping the regulation of insulin secretion. While HaTx_{1} has successfully been synthesized by fusion in E. coli bacteria, its yield is very low (~1%), limiting its pharmacological use.
