= GsMTx-4 =

Grammostola mechanotoxin 4

M-theraphotoxin-Gr1a
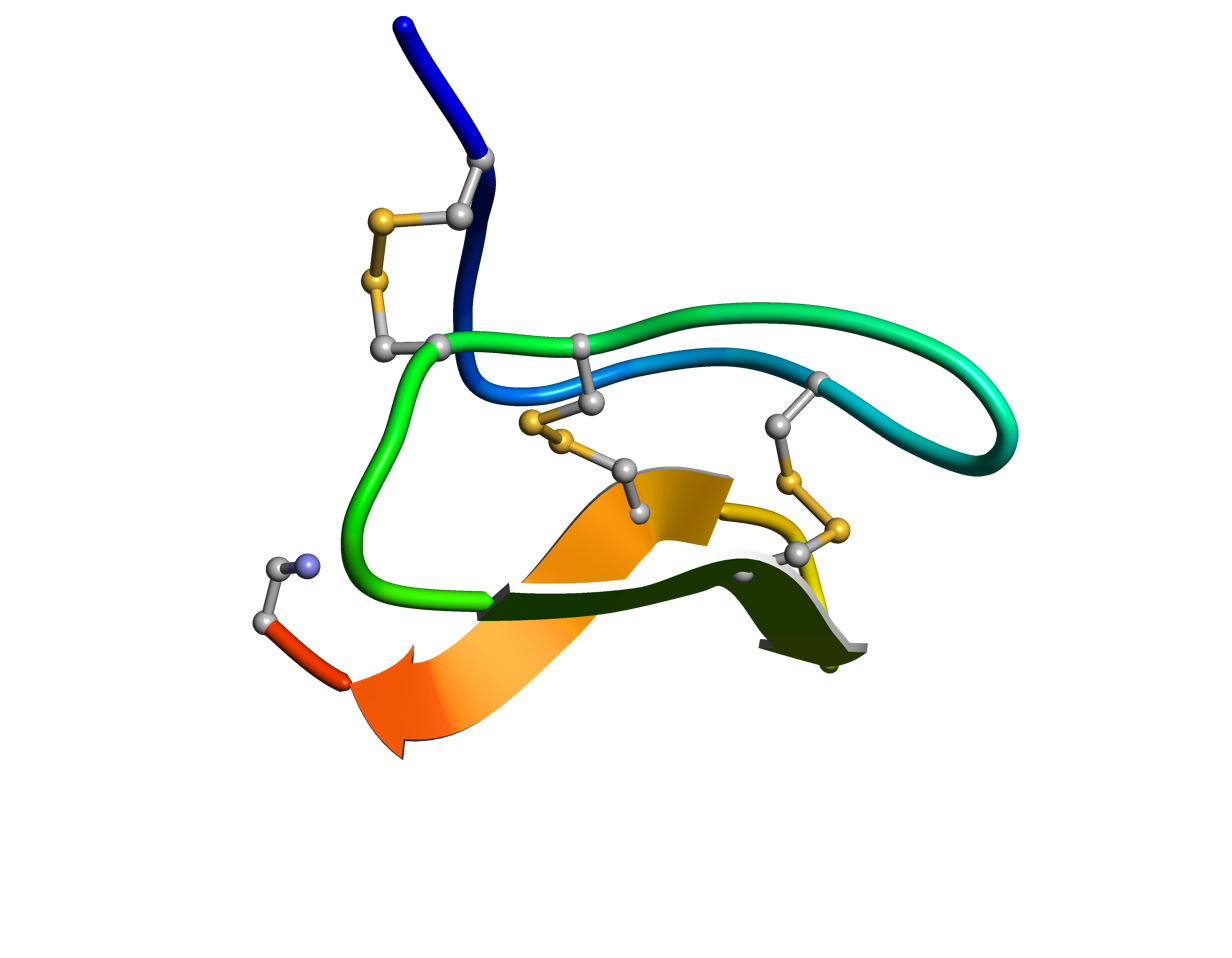

Identifiers
- Organism: Grammostola rosea
- Symbol: GsMTx-4
- PDB: 1LU8
- UniProt: Q7YT39
Search for
- Structures: Swiss-model
- Domains: InterPro

GsMTx-4
Names
- IUPAC name glycyl-cysteinyl-leucyl-alpha-glutamyl-phenylalanyl-tryptophyl-tryptophyl-lysyl-cysteinyl-asparagyl-prolyl-asparagyl-alpha-aspartyl-alpha-aspartyl-lysyl-cysteinyl-cysteinyl-arginyl-prolyl-lysyl-leucyl-lysyl-cysteinyl-seryl-lysyl-leucyl-phenylalanyl-lysyl-leucyl-cysteinyl-asparagyl-phenylalanyl-seryl-phenylalaninamide (2->17),(9->23),(16->30)-tris(disulfide)
- Other names: M-TRTx-Gr1a; M-theraphotoxin-Gr1a

Identifiers
CAS Number	1209500-46-8
3D model (JSmol)	Interactive image
ChEBI	CHEBI:194078
ChemSpider	76827051
DrugBank	DB17861
PubChem CID	90488987
- InChI: InChI=1S/C185H273N49O45S6/c1-98(2)72-121-160(255)203-114(54-27-33-65-188)156(251)229-141-96-284-283-95-140-178(273)225-134(84-147(195)239)184(279)234-71-39-60-144(234)182(277)224-131(83-146(194)238)170(265)222-133(86-151(245)246)172(267)223-132(85-150(243)244)171(266)206-116(56-29-35-67-190)158(253)230-142(97-285-282-94-139(177(272)221-130(82-145(193)237)169(264)218-127(79-105-46-19-12-20-47-105)166(261)226-136(91-236)174(269)211-120(152(196)247)76-102-40-13-9-14-41-102)231-163(258)124(75-101(7)8)214-153(248)112(52-25-31-63-186)204-164(259)125(77-103-42-15-10-16-43-103)217-162(257)123(74-100(5)6)213-154(249)113(53-26-32-64-187)207-173(268)135(90-235)227-179(141)274)180(275)232-138(176(271)210-119(58-37-69-199-185(197)198)183(278)233-70-38-59-143(233)181(276)209-117(155(250)212-121)57-30-36-68-191)93-281-280-92-137(202-148(240)87-192)175(270)215-122(73-99(3)4)161(256)208-118(61-62-149(241)242)159(254)216-126(78-104-44-17-11-18-45-104)165(260)219-129(81-107-89-201-111-51-24-22-49-109(107)111)168(263)220-128(80-106-88-200-110-50-23-21-48-108(106)110)167(262)205-115(157(252)228-140)55-28-34-66-189/h9-24,40-51,88-89,98-101,112-144,200-201,235-236H,25-39,52-87,90-97,186-192H2,1-8H3,(H2,193,237)(H2,194,238)(H2,195,239)(H2,196,247)(H,202,240)(H,203,255)(H,204,259)(H,205,262)(H,206,266)(H,207,268)(H,208,256)(H,209,276)(H,210,271)(H,211,269)(H,212,250)(H,213,249)(H,214,248)(H,215,270)(H,216,254)(H,217,257)(H,218,264)(H,219,260)(H,220,263)(H,221,272)(H,222,265)(H,223,267)(H,224,277)(H,225,273)(H,226,261)(H,227,274)(H,228,252)(H,229,251)(H,230,253)(H,231,258)(H,232,275)(H,241,242)(H,243,244)(H,245,246)(H4,197,198,199) Key: WVDNTWXIIKNMHY-UHFFFAOYSA-N
- SMILES: [H]NCC(=O)N[C@H]1CSSC[C@@H]2NC(=O)[C@@H]3CSSC[C@H](NC(=O)[C@H](CC(C)C)NC(=O)[C@H](CCCCN)NC(=O)[C@H](CC4=CC=CC=C4)NC(=O)[C@H](CC(C)C)NC(=O)[C@H](CCCCN)NC(=O)[C@H](CO)NC(=O)[C@H](CSSC[C@H](NC(=O)[C@H](CCCCN)NC(=O)[C@H](CC4=CNC5=C4C=CC=C5)NC(=O)[C@H](CC4=CNC5=C4C=CC=C5)NC(=O)[C@H](CC4=CC=CC=C4)NC(=O)[C@H](CCC(O)=O)NC(=O)[C@H](CC(C)C)NC1=O)C(=O)N[C@@H](CC(N)=O)C(=O)N1CCC[C@H]1C(=O)N[C@@H](CC(N)=O)C(=O)N[C@@H](CC(O)=O)C(=O)N[C@@H](CC(O)=O)C(=O)N[C@@H](CCCCN)C(=O)N3)NC(=O)[C@H](CCCCN)NC(=O)[C@H](CC(C)C)NC(=O)[C@H](CCCCN)NC(=O)[C@@H]1CCCN1C(=O)[C@H](CCCNC(N)=N)NC2=O)C(=O)N[C@@H](CC(N)=O)C(=O)N[C@@H](CC1=CC=CC=C1)C(=O)N[C@@H](CO)C(=O)N[C@@H](CC1=CC=CC=C1)C(N)=O

Properties
Chemical formula	C_{185}H_{273}N_{49}O_{45}S_{6}
Molar mass	4095.88 g·mol^{−1}
Solubility in water	1 mg/mL
- Except where otherwise noted, data are given for materials in their standard state (at 25 °C [77 °F], 100 kPa). Infobox references

Grammostola mechanotoxin #4 (GsMTx-4, GsMTx4, GsMTx-IV), also known as M-theraphotoxin-Gr1a (M-TRTX-Gr1a), is a neurotoxin isolated from the venom of the spider Chilean rose tarantula Grammostola spatulate (or Grammostola rosea). This amphiphilic peptide, which consists of 35 amino acids, belongs to the inhibitory cysteine knot (ICK) peptide family. It reduces mechanical sensation by inhibiting mechanosensitive channels (MSCs).

GsMTx-4 also serves as a cationic antimicrobial peptide against Gram-positive bacteria.

== Source ==
GsMTx-4 was isolated from the venom of Grammostola spatulata. After a blocking effect on mechanosensitive channels of the spider venom was detected in 1996, GsMTx-4 was isolated and identified from the venom later in 2000. Its concentration in the venom is ~2 mM.

== Chemistry ==
=== Structure ===
GsMTx-4 has a polypeptide chain of 35 amino acids with the sequence GCLEF-WWKCN-PNDDK-CCRPK-LKCSK-LFKLC-NFSF, the C-terminus is amidated. The toxin is an amphipathic peptide consisting of a large hydrophobic patch which is surrounded by a ring of six polar lysine residues. These hydrophobic residues enable the toxin to carry an overall charge of +5. The toxin contains three intramolecular disulfide bonds that contribute to the formation of its inhibitor cystine knot (ICK).

=== Homology ===
GsMTx-4 shares less than 50% of its sequence homology with all other known peptide toxins. The highest percentage of sequence homology is shared with other tarantula toxins that block voltage-gated calcium channels and voltage-gated potassium channels. The ICK, as well as the residues F4, D13, and L20, are conserved in these tarantula toxins.

=== Properties ===
Like other peptides belonging to the super-family of the ICK, GsMTx-4 is amphipathic. Therefore, GsMTx-4 is able to interact with the hydrophobic side of the lipid bilayer. It can insert itself into the membrane by binding to anionic and cationic groups based on hydrophobic and electrostatic interactions. However, GsMTx-4 has a weak selectivity for the anionic phospholipids over the zwitterionic phospholipids of the lipid bilayer compared to other ICK peptides.

For all ICK blocker peptides, the dominating aromatic residues in the hydrophobic face are widely considered to promote the binding and adsorption of the peptide to the lipid bilayer by positively contributing to its bilayer partitioning energy. Compared with other ICK peptides, GsMTx-4 has a relatively high content of lysine residues, which causes the peptide to be more positively charged. This is important for its orientation and depth of the peptide penetration into the lipid bilayer.

== Target ==
GsMTx-4 mainly targets mechanosensitive channels from the Piezo and TRP families, such as Piezo1 and TRPC6 which are generally bilayer tension-sensitive. This corresponds to the strong bilayer partitioning energy of GsMTx-4. It also targets a spectrum of voltage-dependent sodium channels (human Na_{v}1.1- Na_{v}1.7), human ERG channels (K_{v}11.1 and K_{v}11.2), and acetylcholine receptors.

== Mode of action ==
The molecular mechanism of inhibiting mechanosensitive channels by GsMTx-4 is bilayer-dependent. Rather than directly binding to the gating structures like other ICK peptides do, GsMTx4 makes the mechanosensitive channels less sensitive to mechanical tension of the bilayer membrane. By its tension-dependent insertion into the membrane, GsMTx4 is thought to distort the distribution of tension near mechanosensitive channels, which will make the transfer of force from the bilayer to the channel less efficient. Unlike other ICK peptides, the action of GsMTx-4 is not stereospecific, as both L- and D-GsMTx-4 can block MSCs.

== Binding affinity ==
Published K_{D} value and IC_{50} values are listed here.

K_{D} value and IC_{50} values of GsMTx-4
	K_{D}	IC_{50}
Piezo1	~155 nM	-
Na_{v}1.1-1.7	-	7.4-14.1 μM
K_{v}11.1-11.2	-	10.9-11 μM

== Therapeutic use ==
GsMTx-4 might play a role in the treatment of volume-activated arrhythmias or muscular dystrophy; it potentially has good therapeutic properties because it is well tolerated following injection in mice, it is non-immunogenic, biologically stable, does not directly interact with MSCs, and has a long pharmacokinetic lifetime.
