= Tachystatin =

Tachystatin_A
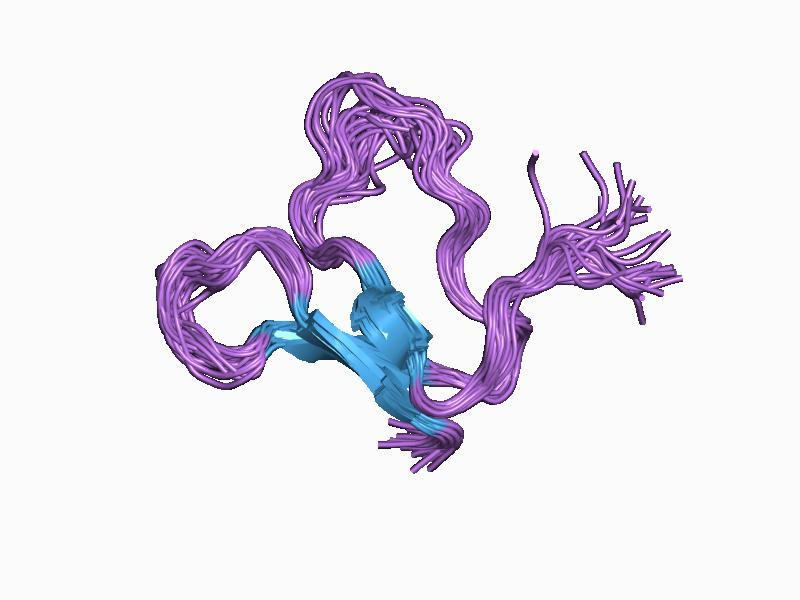
- Three-dimensional structure of antimicrobial peptide tachystatin A. PDB entry 1cix

Identifiers
- Symbol: Tachystatin_A
- Pfam: PF11406
- InterPro: IPR022717
- OPM superfamily: 112
- OPM protein: 2dcv
Available protein structures:
- PDB: IPR022717 PF11406 (ECOD; PDBsum)
- AlphaFold: IPR022717; PF11406

Tachystatin_B

Identifiers
- Symbol: Tachystatin_B
- Pfam: PF11478
- Pfam clan: CL0083
- InterPro: IPR020957
Available protein structures:
- PDB: IPR020957 PF11478 (ECOD; PDBsum)
- AlphaFold: IPR020957; PF11478

Tachystatins are antimicrobial chitin-binding peptides from Japanese horseshoe crab. Amino acid residues Tyr(14) and Arg(17) in Tachystatin B are thought to be the essential residues for chitin binding. These small proteins contain a cysteine-stabilised triple-stranded beta-sheet with an inhibitor cystine knot motif and show features common to membrane-interactive peptides. Tachystatin A is thought to have an antimicrobial activity similar to defensins.
