= Coremiocnemis =

Scientific classification
- Kingdom: Animalia
- Phylum: Arthropoda
- Subphylum: Chelicerata
- Class: Arachnida
- Order: Araneae
- Infraorder: Mygalomorphae
- Family: Theraphosidae
- Subfamily: Selenocosmiinae
- Genus: Coremiocnemis; Simon, 1892

Type species
- C. cunicularia (Simon, 1892)

Species
- 6, see text

Genus of spiders

Coremiocnemis is a genus of tarantulas that was first described by Eugène Louis Simon in 1892. They are named after the greek words korema, which means broom or brush, and kemis, meaning shin guard. Being a reference to the hirsute characteristics of the posterior legs.

== Diagnosis ==
They can be distinguished from other genera by having long, hair brushes along the retrolateral metatarsus and tarsus in leg 4. Females also have a spermathecae with two lobes, and males have pegs in the chelicerae.

== Species ==
As of August 2022 it contains six species, with three other transferred to Psednocnemis, they are found in Indonesia, Malaysia, and Queensland:

- Coremiocnemis cunicularia (Simon, 1892) (type) – Malaysia
- Coremiocnemis hoggi West & Nunn, 2010 – Malaysia
- Coremiocnemis kotacana West & Nunn, 2010 – Indonesia (Sumatra)
- Coremiocnemis obscura West & Nunn, 2010 – Malaysia
- Coremiocnemis tropix Raven, 2005 – Australia (Queensland)
- Coremiocnemis valida Pocock, 1895 – Borneo

=== Transferred to other genera ===
- Coremiocnemis brachyramosa West & Nunn, 2010 → Psednocnemis brachyramosa
- Coremiocnemis gnathospina West & Nunn, 2010 → Psednocnemis gnathospina
- Coremiocnemis jeremyhuffi West & Nunn, 2010 → Psednocnemis jeremyhuffi
