= Albumin I =

Albumin_I
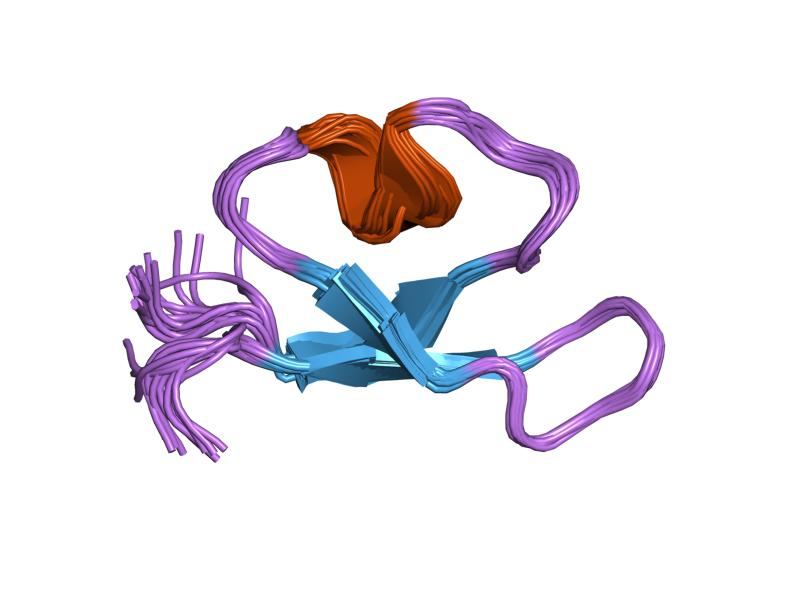
- Solution structure of PA1b. PDB entry 1p8b

Identifiers
- Symbol: Albumin_I
- Pfam: PF08027
- Pfam clan: CL0083
- InterPro: IPR012512
Available protein structures:
- Pfam: structures / ECOD
- PDB: RCSB PDB; PDBe; PDBj
- PDBsum: structure summary

Albumin I (PA1b) is a hormone-like peptide found in the seeds of legumes such as the pea plant (Pisum sativum) or soya bean (Glycine max) which have been shown to have insecticidal properties. It stimulates kinase activity upon binding a membrane bound 43 kDa receptor within the plant which affects cell proliferation. The structure reveals an inhibitor cystine knot (knottin)-like fold, comprising three beta strands.
