= Coremiocnemis tropix =

Scientific classification
- Kingdom: Animalia
- Phylum: Arthropoda
- Subphylum: Chelicerata
- Class: Arachnida
- Order: Araneae
- Infraorder: Mygalomorphae
- Family: Theraphosidae
- Genus: Coremiocnemis
- Species: C. tropix

Binomial name
- Coremiocnemis tropix Raven, 2005

Species of spider

Coremiocnemis tropix, also known as the rainforest tarantula, is a species of mygalomorph spider in the Theraphosidae family. It is endemic to Australia. It was described in 2005 by Australian arachnologist Robert Raven.

== Distribution and habitat ==
The species occurs in Far North Queensland in rainforest habitats. The type locality is Atherton.

== Behaviour ==
The species is univoltine.
