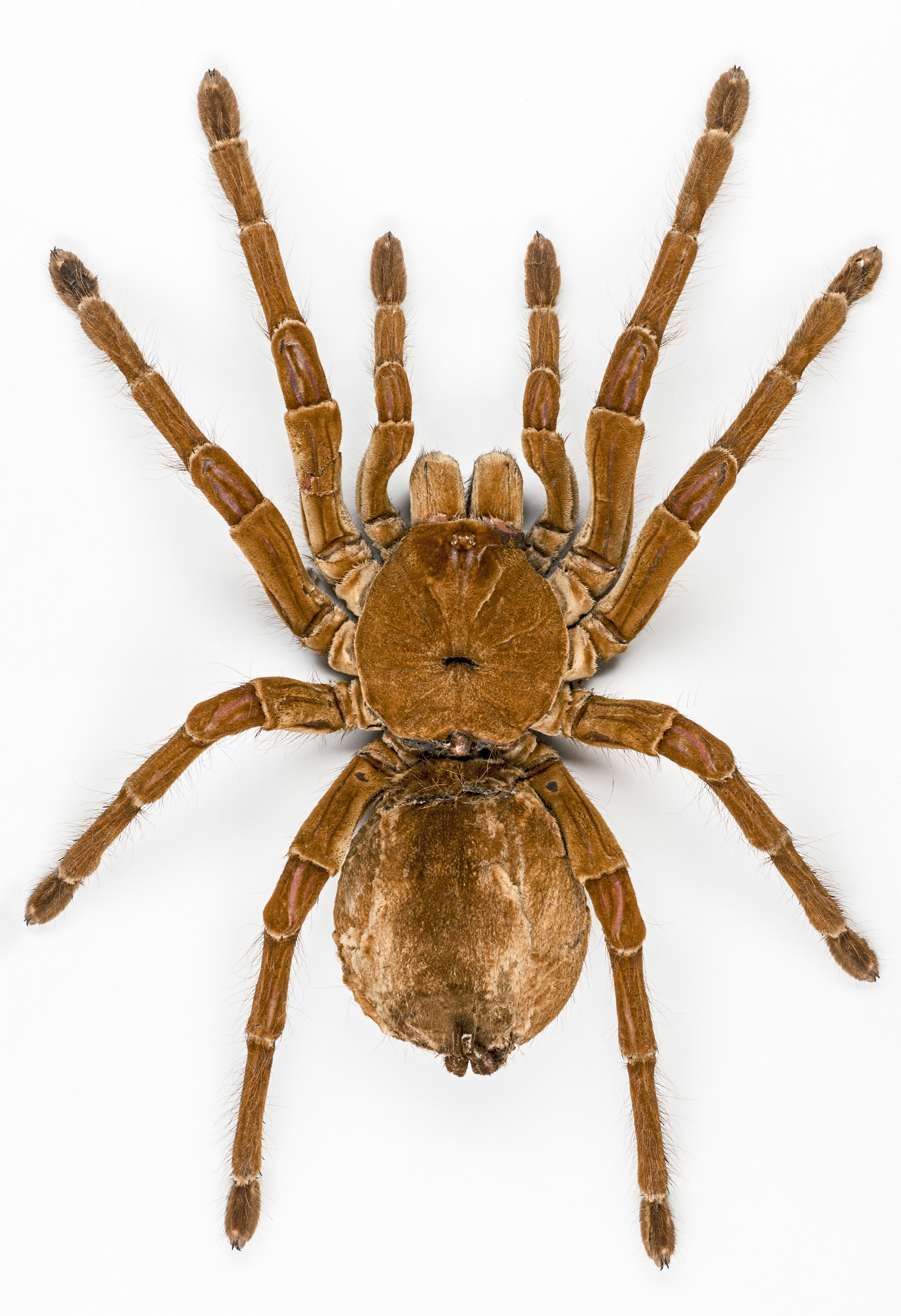

Scientific classification
- Kingdom: Animalia
- Phylum: Arthropoda
- Subphylum: Chelicerata
- Class: Arachnida
- Order: Araneae
- Infraorder: Mygalomorphae
- Family: Theraphosidae
- Genus: Theraphosa
- Species: T. blondi

Binomial name
- Theraphosa blondi (Latreille, 1804)

Synonyms
- T. blondii; T. leblondii

= Goliath birdeater =

Species of tarantula from South America

The Goliath birdeater (Theraphosa blondi) is a large spider that belongs to the tarantula family Theraphosidae. Found in northern South America, it is the largest spider in the world by mass (175 g (6.2 oz)) and body length (up to 13 cm (5.1 in)), and second to the giant huntsman spider by leg span. It is also considerably longer than the largest known prehistoric spider, Mongolarachne, that had a body length of 2.46 centimeters (0.97 in). It is also called the Goliath tarantula or Goliath bird-eating spider; the practice of calling theraphosids "bird-eating" derives from an early 18th-century copper engraving by Maria Sibylla Merian that shows one eating a hummingbird. Despite the spider's name, it rarely preys on birds.

== Characteristics ==
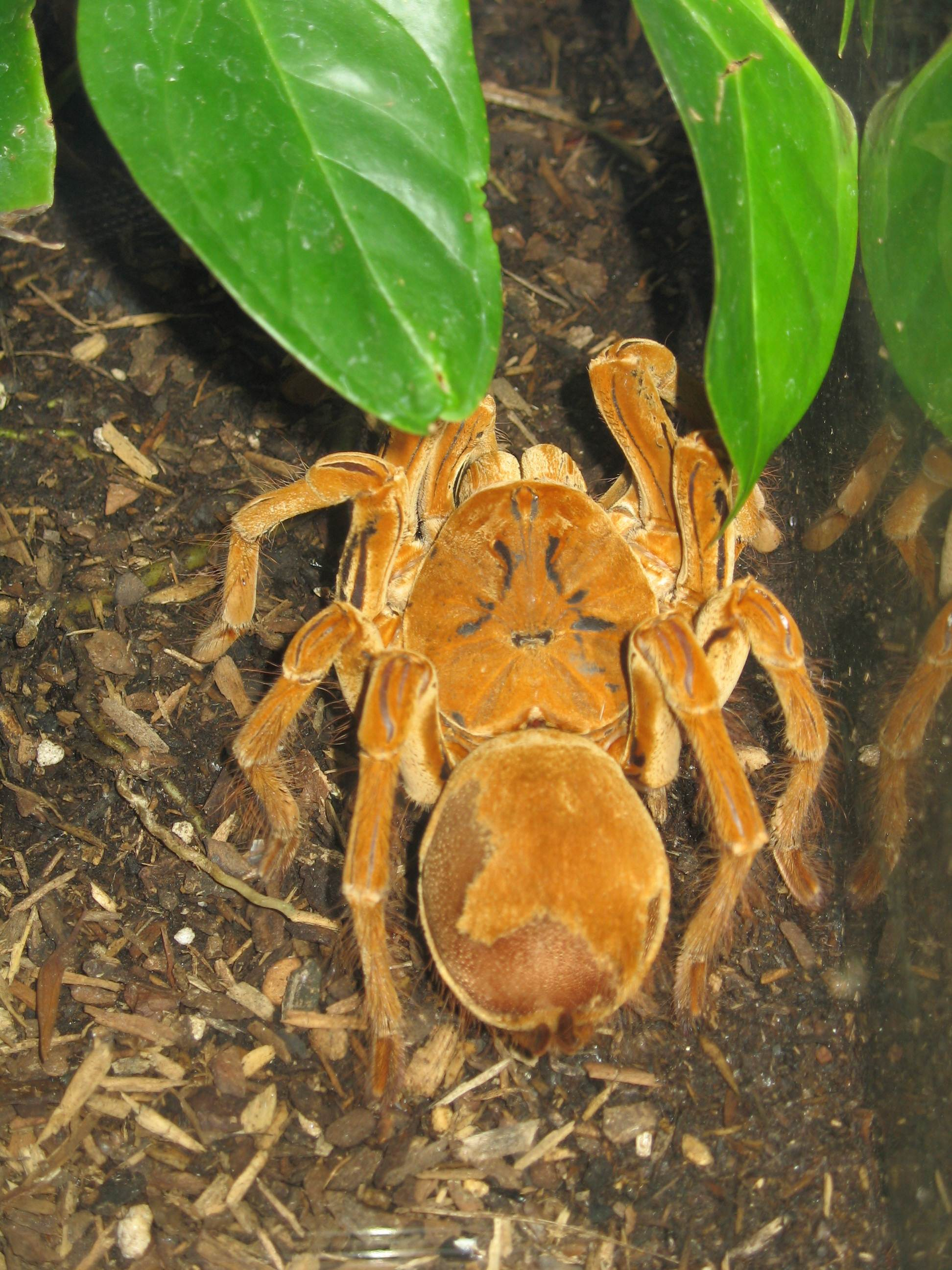
The Goliath birdeater found in South America

These spiders can have a leg span of up to 30 cm (12 in), a body length of up to 13 cm (5.1 in), and can weigh up to 175 g (6.2 oz). Birdeaters are one of the few tarantula species that lack tibial spurs, located on the first pair of legs of most adult males. They are mostly tan to light brown and golden-hued.

== Life cycle ==
Unlike some other species of spider, females rarely eat the males during mating. Females mature in 3-6 years and have an average lifespan of 15 to 25 years. Males die soon after maturity and have a lifespan of three to six years. Colors range from dark- to light-brown with faint markings on the legs. Bird-eaters have hair on their bodies, abdomens, and legs. The female lays 100 to 200 eggs, which hatch into spiderlings within 6 to 8 weeks.

== Behavior ==
=== Defenses ===
In response to threats, Goliath birdeaters stridulate by rubbing setae on their pedipalps and legs. Also, when threatened they rub their abdomen with their hind legs and release hairs that are a severe irritant to the skin and mucous membranes. These urticating hairs can be harmful to humans.

Like all tarantulas, T. blondi spiders have fangs large enough (2–4 cm or 0.79–1.57 in) to break the skin of a human. They carry venom in their fangs and have been known to bite when threatened, but the venom is relatively harmless and its effects are comparable to those of a wasp's sting. Tarantulas generally bite humans only in self-defense, and these bites do not always result in envenomation (known as a "dry bite”).

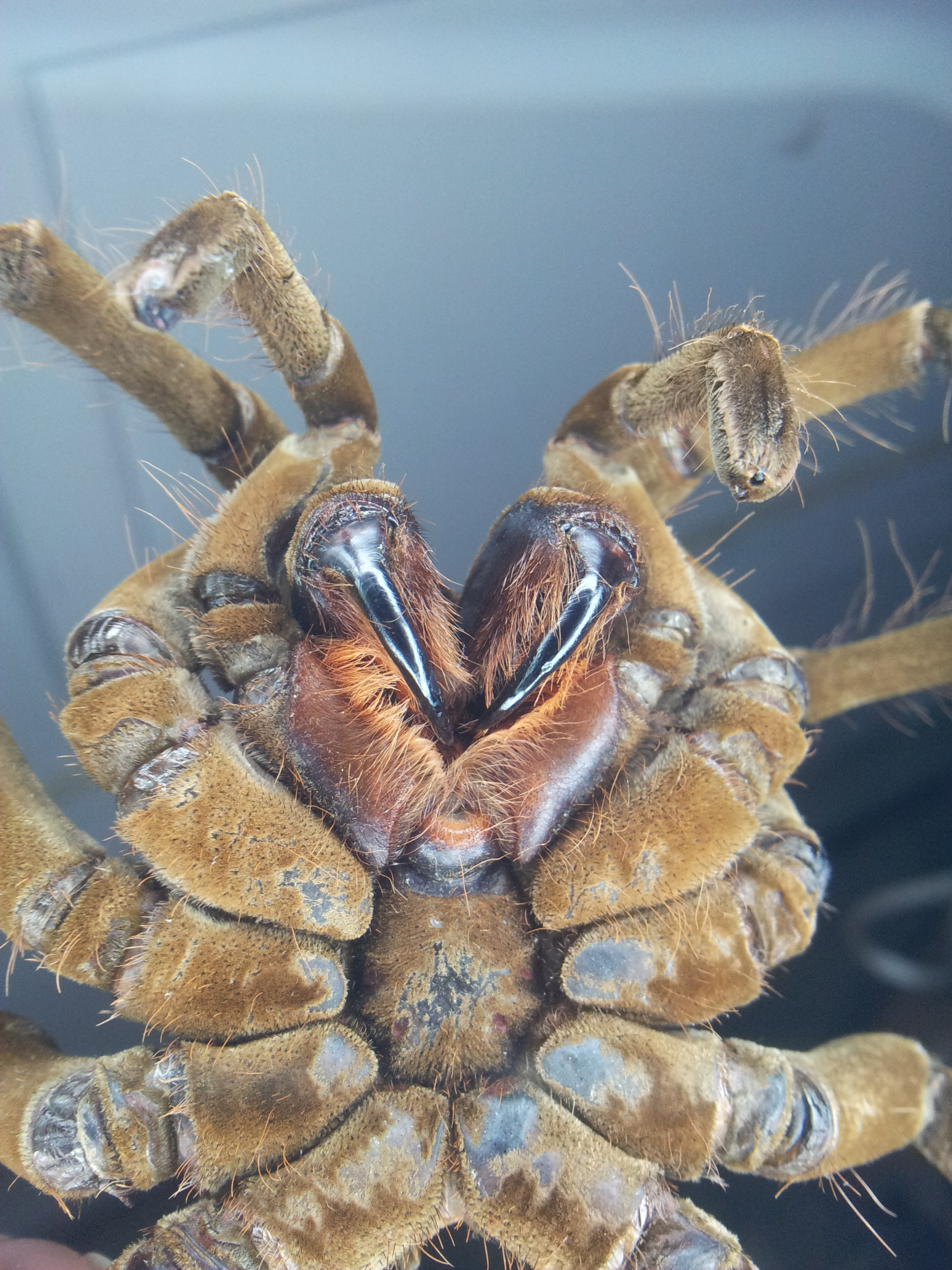
A captive adult female (ventral view)

=== Feeding ===
Despite its name, the Goliath birdeater only rarely actually preys on birds; in the wild, its diet consists primarily of other large arthropods, worms, and amphibians. However, because of its size and opportunistic predatory behavior, this species commonly kills and consumes a variety of insects and small terrestrial vertebrates. They do not consume their prey in the open; rather, they drag it back to their burrow and begin the digesting process. They do this by liquefying the insides of their prey and proceeding to suck it dry. In the wild, T. blondi has been observed feeding on rodents, frogs, toads, lizards, and even snakes.

== Distribution and habitat ==
The Goliath birdeater is native to the upland rainforest regions of Northern South America: Suriname, Guyana, French Guiana, northern Brazil, eastern Colombia, and southern Venezuela. Most noticeable in the Amazon rainforest, the spider is terrestrial, living in deep burrows, and is found commonly in marshy or swampy areas. It is a nocturnal species.

== Culinary use ==
The Goliath birdeater is an edible spider. The spider is part of the local cuisine in northeastern South America, prepared by singeing off the urticating hairs and roasting it in banana leaves. The flavor has been described as "shrimp-like".

== See also ==
- TLTx, a toxin found in Goliath birdeater venom
- Giant huntsman spider, largest known spider in the world by leg span
- Mongolarachne jurassica, the largest known fossilized spider
