= Covalitoxin-II =

Spider toxin

Covalitoxin-II is a peptide toxin that is produced by the spider species Coremiocnemis validus. It can induce excitatory, non-lethal behavioral symptoms like quivering and jerking in crickets.

== Sources ==
Covalitoxin-II (Cvtx-II) is a toxin in the venom of Coremiocnemis validus (Singapore or Blue femur tarantula). This spider lives in South East Asian tropical forests.

== Chemistry ==
=== Structure ===
The toxin consists of 31 amino acids (ACSRAGENCYKSGRCCDGLYCKAYVVTCYKP). This sequence forms a peptide with a molecular weight of 3.4 kDa. It has six cysteine residues which form three disulphide bonds, between the specific amino acid locations 2&16, 19&21 and 15&28. There is an equal distribution of hydrophilic, hydrophobic and neutral amino acids. Near the C-terminus there is a positively charged surface formed by conserved basic residues, which is thought to interact with an ion channel. The inhibitor cystine knot motif that is formed by the cysteine residues shows analogy to other spider toxins and can also be found in ω-conotoxins, which are present in the venom of cone snails. It has low homology with two peptides:

- 47% homology with spider peptide PLTX-II (calcium channel blocker)
- 47% homology with conotoxin MrVIB (sodium channel blocker)

== Target and mechanism of action ==
The specific target and mechanism of action of Cvtx-II are not yet clear. Based on its effect on behavior, it has been speculated that Cvtx-II targets sodium channel inactivation, analogous to some excitotoxins.

== Toxicity ==
Cvtx-II induces the following non-lethal symptoms in crickets:

- Quivering, jerking, and hyperextension of the legs
- Rapid movement of antenna, mandibles and maxillae
- Abdominal contraction
- Frequent body arching
- Loss of righting reflex
- Greatly reduced locomotion
- Indications of paralysis

Experiments have shown that these symptoms are not in present in cockroaches or mice after Cvtx-II injections. Therefore, Cvtx-II is thought to be an insect species-specific neurotoxic peptide. A dose of 0.2 μmol/g was necessary to immobilize or inactivate 50% of the insects (ID50). After 40–60 minutes, the immobilizing effects disappear.
