= Heteropodatoxin =

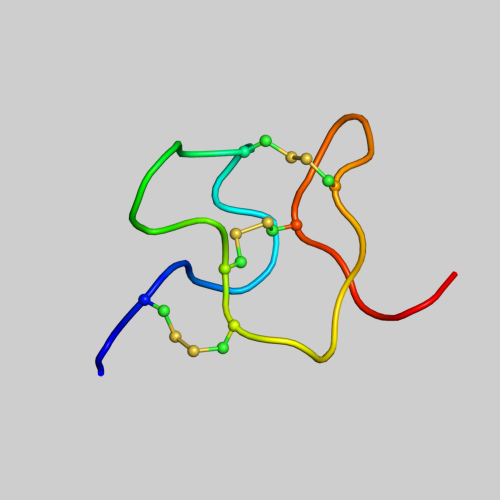
Solution structure of heteropodatoxin-2. PDB entry 1emx

Heteropodatoxins are peptide toxins from the venom of the giant crab spider Heteropoda venatoria, which block Kv4.2 voltage-gated potassium channels.

== Sources ==
Heteropodatoxins are purified from the venom of the giant crab spider, Heteropoda venatoria.

== Chemistry ==
Heteropodatoxins contain an Inhibitor Cystine Knot (ICK) motif, which consist of a compact disulfide-bonded core, from which four loops emerge. There are three different heteropodatoxins:

- heteropodatoxin-1, also known as Toxin AU3/KJ5 or HpTx1
- heteropodatoxin-2, also known as Toxin KJ6 or HpTx2
- heteropodatoxin-3, also known as Toxin AU5C/KJ7 or HpTx3

These three toxins are structurally similar peptides of 29-32 amino acids. They show sequence similarity to Hanatoxins, which can be isolated from the venom of the Chilean rose tarantula Grammostola rosea.

== Target ==
Heteropodatoxins block A-type, transient voltage-gated potassium channels. All three toxins have been shown to block the potassium channel Kv4.2. Recombinant heteropodatoxin-2 blocks the potassium channels Kv4.1, Kv4.2 and Kv4.3, but not Kv1.4, Kv2.1, or Kv3.4.

== Mode of action ==
Heterpodatoxin-2 most likely acts as a gating modifier of the Kv4.2 channels. It shifts the voltage dependence of the activation and the inactivation of the Kv4.3 potassium channel to more positive values. As a result, in the presence of the toxin this channel has a higher probability of being inactivated and a larger depolarization is needed to open the channel. However, heterpodatoxin-2 did not affect the voltage dependence of the Kv4.1 channel, suggesting that the precise mechanism of block remains to be elucidated, and a role as a pore blocker cannot be excluded. The voltage dependence of Kv4.2 block varies among the three different heteropodatoxins. It is less voltage dependent for HpTx1 than for HpTx2 or HpTx3.

== Toxicity ==
The giant crab spider can cause a locally painful bite.

== Bibliography ==
- Bernard C, Legros C, Ferrat G, Bischoff U, Marquardt A, Pongs O, Darbon H (2000). "Solution structure of hpTX2, a toxin from Heteropoda venatoria spider that blocks Kv4.2 potassium channel". Protein Sci. 9 (11): 2059–67. PMC 2144494. PMID 11152117.
- Sanguinetti MC, Johnson JH, Hammerland LG, Kelbaugh PR, Volkmann RA, Saccomano NA, Mueller AL (1997). "Heteropodatoxins: peptides isolated from spider venom that block Kv4.2 potassium channels". Mol. Pharmacol. 51 (3): 491–8. PMID 9058605.
- Zarayskiy VV, Balasubramanian G, Bondarenko VE, Morales MJ (2005). "Heteropoda toxin 2 is a gating modifier toxin specific for voltage-gated K+ channels of the Kv4 family". Toxicon. 45 (4): 431–42. doi:10.1016/j.toxicon.2004.11.015. PMID 15733564.
