= Omega-Grammotoxin SIA =

omega-Grammotoxin SIA (ω-grammotoxin SIA) is a protein toxin that inhibits P, Q, and N voltage-gated calcium channels (Ca^{2+} channels) in neurons.

== Sources ==
The source of ω-grammotoxin SIA is the venom of a tarantula spider (Grammostola rosea).

== Chemistry ==
Amino acid sequence: Asp-Cys-Val-Arg-Phe-Trp-Gly-Lys-Cys-Ser-Gln-Thr-Ser-Asp-Cys-Cys-Pro-His-Leu-Ala-Cys-Lys-Ser-Lys-Trp-Pro-Arg-Asn-Ile-Cys-Val-Trp-Asp-Gly-Ser-Val

Molecular formula: C_{177}H_{268}N_{52}O_{50}S_{6}

ω-Grammotoxin SIA can be purified from Grammostola rosea venom by reverse phase high performance liquid chromatography.

== Target ==
ω-Grammotoxin SIA is a 36 amino acid residue protein toxin from spider venom that inhibits P, Q, and N-type voltage-gated calcium channels in neurons. It binds to the channels with high affinity (if closed). It also binds to potassium channels but with lower affinity than to the calcium channels. The toxin binding site has high affinity when channels are in closed states and low affinity when channels are activated. (4)

== Mode of action ==
It is believed that ω-grammotoxin SIA inhibits channel function by binding with high affinity to closed, resting states of the channel and that bound toxin makes it more difficult for channels to be opened by depolarization, so much larger depolarizations are required for channel activation.
