= Maurocalcine =

Protein

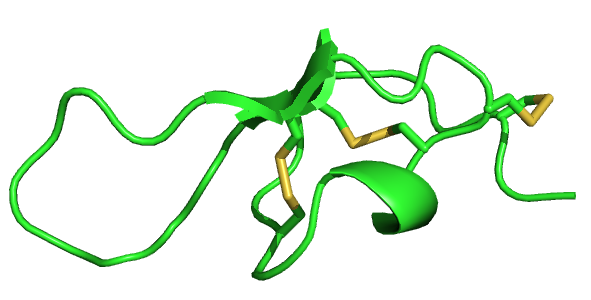
- Structure of Maurocalcine, determined by NMR

Identifiers
- Organism: Scorpio maurus palmatus
- Symbol: MCa
- PDB: 1c6w
- UniProt: P60254
Search for
- Structures: Swiss-model
- Domains: InterPro

Maurocalcine (MCa) is a protein, 33 Amino acid residues in length, isolated from the venom of the scorpion Maurus palmatus, which belongs to the family Chactidae, first characterized in 2000. The toxin is present in such small amounts that it could not be isolated to analyze it, so a chemical synthesis of this toxin was performed by the solid-phase technique so it could be fully characterized. It shares 82% sequence identity with imperatoxin A (IpTx A), a scorpion toxin from the venom of Pandinus imperator. IpTx A acts by modifying the activity of the type 1 ryanodine receptor of skeletal muscle. RyR controls the intracellular Ca^{2+} permeability of various cell types and is central in the process of excitation–contraction of muscle tissues. The synthesized toxin, sMCa is active on RyR1 and it binds onto a site different from that of ryanodine itself.

== Structural components ==
MCa folds folds into the inhibitor cystine knot motif. The structure consists of a compact disulfide-bond core with the following three pairs: Cys3-Cys17, Cys10-Cys21, and Cys16-Cys32 (Fig. 1). Another important feature of MCa is the dipole moment which exists because of the basic-rich surface including the residues Lys19, Lys20, Lys22, Arg23, Arg24, and Arg3 without any acidic residue. Compared to the opposite surface contains four acidic residues Asp2, Glu12, Asp15, and Glu29 (Fig. 2). This dipole moment is proposed to help it cross the membrane. The only element of regular secondary structure is a double-stranded antiparallel b-sheet comprising residues 20–23 and 30–33.

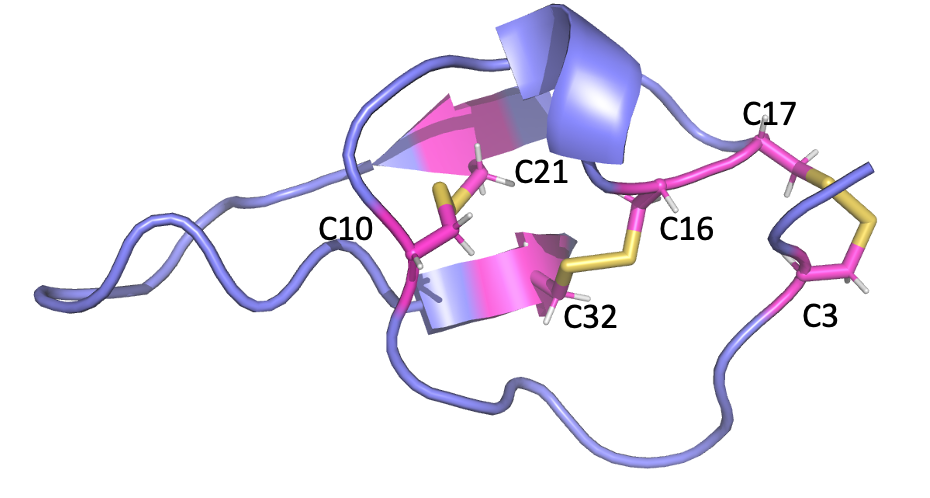
Figure 1: The Inhibitor Cystine Knot motif is shown. A compact disulfide-bond core with the following three pairs: Cys3-Cys17, Cys10-Cys21, and Cys16-Cys32.

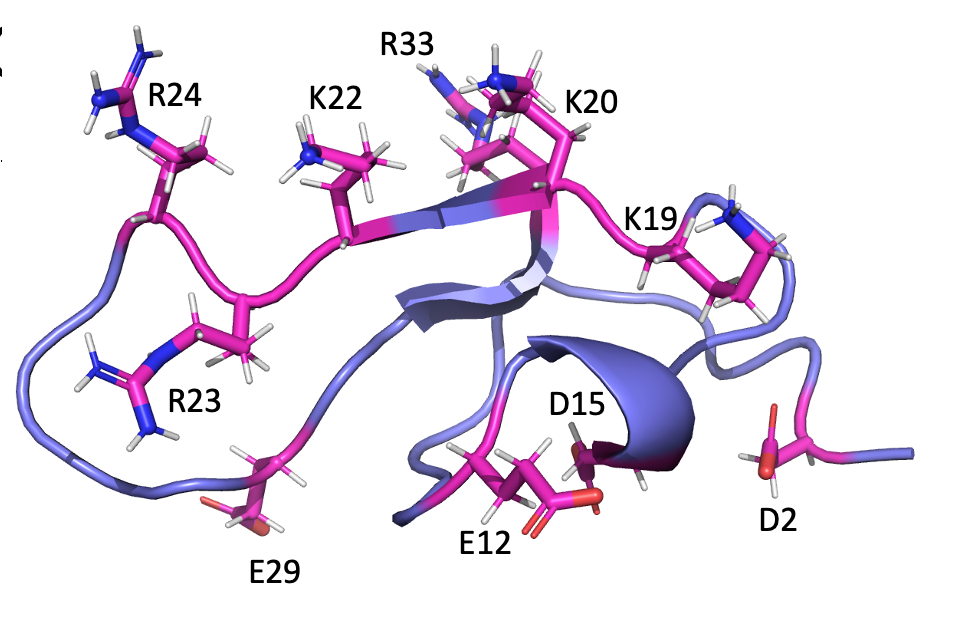
Figure 2: MCa has a dipole moment with a basic-rich surface including the residues Lys19, Lys20, Lys22, Arg23, Arg24, and Arg3 without any acidic residue. The opposite surface contains four acidic residues Asp2, Glu12, Asp15, and Glu29.

== Membrane permeability ==
Evidence suggests that MCa can cross a membrane. First, MCa has biological activity consistent with the direct activation of RyR1 when added to the extracellular medium. Second, MCa contains a stretch of positively charged amino acid residues that is reminiscent of the protein transduction domains (PTD) found in proteins known to cross the membrane. MCa is suggested to be a cell-penetrating peptide (CPP). CPPs commonly contain many basic residues oriented toward the same face of the molecule. This structural feature allows CPPs to cross biological membranes in a receptor- or transporter-independent manner through a mechanism called translocation. MCa is similar to CPP sequences because MCa is a small peptide, it has a net positive charge, it enters many cell types, it enters in an efficient manner and at low concentration, the translocation is a fast process that is energy-independent, and it can carry a cargo molecule. MCa is unique because it can enter cells against its concentration gradient, and it enters the cell far more rapidly than its exit. Also, the disulfide linkage of MCa, which makes it more rigid than other CPPs, implies that the transduction mechanism at the basis of MCa cell penetration does not rely on extensive peptide unfolding.

== Mutagenesis findings ==
To look closer at the basic surface that allows the protein to cross the membrane, mutagenesis was performed changing amino acids at different positions, by substituting a charged amino acid with a neutral one. The specific mutations were K8A, K19A, K20A, K22A, R23A, R24A and the effects of MCa and its mutants on RyR1 incorporated into artificial lipid bilayers and on elementary calcium release events (ECRE) in rat and frog skeletal muscle fibers were observed. The corresponding mutations should evoke parallel changes in the affinity if the continuity of the basic surface is essential. However, the average length and frequency of ECRE was decreased if the mutation was placed farther away in the 3D structure from the critical 24Arg residue. This reveals that the effect of the mutations of basic amino acids to neutral amino acids cannot be solely attributed to the change of the net electrical charge of the peptide since mutations that were distant to the cluster but produced the same change in net electrical charge had relatively minor effects.

== Potential medical applications ==
MCa was coupled to streptavidine which is of significantly higher mass than MCa itself. This demonstrates that MCa can also carry large molecules into cells, similar to other CPPs. The toxin complex efficiently penetrated into various cell types without requiring metabolic energy or implicating an endocytosis mechanism. MCa has the ability to act as a molecular carrier and to cross cell membranes in a rapid manner (1–2 min), making this toxin the first demonstrated example of a scorpion toxin that translocates into cells. This could prove useful if drugs that cannot usually cross a biological membrane could be paired with MCa and carried across the membrane. Recently, cell penetrating peptides have been used for their ability to deliver non-permeant compounds into cells. Doxorubicin, a common cancer therapeutic, has been covalently coupled to an analogue of maurocalcine on drug-sensitive or drug-resistant cell lines MCF7 and MDA-MB 231.
