= Huwentoxin =

Group of neurotoxic peptides

Huwentoxins (HWTX) are a group of neurotoxic peptides found in the venom of the Chinese bird spider Haplopelma schmidti. The species was formerly known as Haplopelma huwenum, Ornithoctonus huwena and Selenocosmia huwena. While structural similarity can be found among several of these toxins, HWTX as a group possess high functional diversity.

== Sources ==
Huwentoxins are neurotoxic peptides produced by the Chinese bird spider, Haplopelma schmidti.

== Overview ==
The venom of H. schmidti contains a large variety of neurotoxins, which function to paralyze the spider's prey. So far, 14 of the isolated primarily neurotoxic peptide components have been characterized and investigated. In the following, two subfamilies of the HWTX are described: those targeting voltage-gated calcium channels, and those targeting voltage-gated sodium channels.

== Toxins targeting voltage-gated calcium channels (VGCC) ==
=== Huwentoxin-I ===
HWTX-I is the most abundant toxic component in the venom of H. schmidti. It inhibits presynaptic N-type Ca^{2+} channels.

==== Chemistry ====
The molecular weight of HWTX-I is 3750 Da. The toxin comprises 33 residues, including six cysteines that form three disulfide linkages. These were assigned as Cys2-Cys17, Cys9-Cys22, and Cys16-Cys29 and are buried within the molecule. The molecule adopts a compact structure consisting of a small triple-stranded antiparallel beta-sheet and five beta-turns. It was found that the structure contains an inhibitor cystine knot (ICK) motif. To form this motif, three disulfide bridges are needed. Two of them create a loop through which the third disulfide bridge passes. The structure of HWTX-I is very stable, secondary structure elements do not significantly alter under different pH conditions or after heating.

==== Mode of action ====
HWTX-I selectively inhibits N-type HVA channels. A recent study found that HWTX-I also inhibits Na^{+} channels.

==== Effects ====
In mice the intraperitoneal LD_{50} of HWTX-I is 0.70 mg/kg, the intracisternal LD_{50} has been determined as 9.40 μg/kg. Neurotoxic symptoms after intraperitoneal injection were gasping, excitation, spastic paralysis of the hindlimb and asynergia.

HWTX-I is a potential novel analgesic pharmaceutic. Epidural administration of HWTX-I in rats with chronic neuropathic pain blocked heat hyperalgesia and mechanical allodynia in the injured hindpaw of rats, indicating that epidurally administered HWTX-I could alleviate neuropathic pain. Cytosolic Ca^{2+} overload is one of the primary factors for inflammatory cells activation, therefore Ca^{2+} channel blockers can have a potential role as an anti-inflammatory drug. HWTX-I can relieve pain in the inflammatory joints and eliminate arthrocele to some degree. In a rat model of rheumatoid arthritis HWTX-I is able to decrease the concentration of tumor necrosis factor α (TNF-α) in serum and decrease the mRNA expression level interleukin 1β (IL-1β) and interleukin 6 (IL-6).

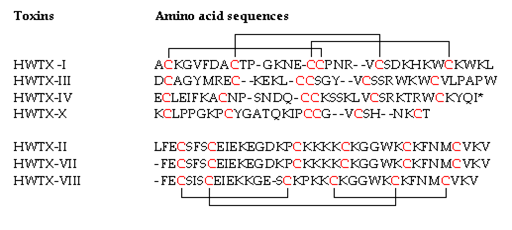
Primary sequences of the peptide isolated from the venom of spider H. schmidti. The disulfide bridge linkage pattern is shown with the connector lines. Cysteines are shown in red. An asterisk indicates that the C-terminal carboxyl group is amidated.

=== Huwentoxin-X ===
HWTX-X is the smallest peptide among the huwentoxins so far isolated.

==== Chemistry ====
HWTX-X has a molecular mass of 2931 Da. It comprises 28 amino acid residues, including six cysteine residues forming three disulfide bridges. Like most huwentoxins, it adopts the ICK motif. HWTX-X shows little homology with other huwentoxins, however, it can cause reversible blockage of N-type Ca^{2+} channels in rat dorsal root ganglion cells under whole-cell voltage clamp conditions. It does show more than 50% homology with the toxin Ptu1 from the assassin bug Peirates turpis and ω-conotoxin SVIA from the Conus striatus, two N-type Ca^{2+} blockers.

==== Mode of action ====
HWTX-X has selectivity for isoforms of N-type Ca^{2+} channels, compared with ω-conotoxins GVIA and MVIIA.

==== Effects ====
HWTX-X specifically blocks GVIA-sensitive, N-type Ca^{2+} channels in rat dorsal root ganglion cells. It does not block L-type Ca^{2+} channels. While structurally similar to ω-conotoxins that block the twitch response to electrical nerve stimulation, HWTX-X has no effect on the twitch response of rat vas deferens.

== Toxins targeting voltage-gated sodium channels (VGSC) ==
=== Huwentoxin-II ===
HWTX-II is an insecticidal peptide and is structurally unusual compared to the other HWTX in that it lacks the typical ICK motif.

==== Chemistry ====
HWTX-II consists of 37 amino acid residues including six cysteines involved in three disulfide bridges. The disulfide linkage of HWTX-II was assigned as Cys4-Cys18, Cys8-Cys29 and Cys23-Cys34, forming a 1-3,2-5 and 4-6 disulfide connectivity. The three-dimensional structure of HWTX II contains two beta-turns (Cys4-Ser7 and Lys24-Trp27) and a double stranded antiparallel beta-sheet (Tryp27-Cys29 and Cys34-Lys36).

==== Mode of action ====
HWTX-II was able to reversibly paralyze cockroaches for several hours, with a median knockdown dose ED_{50} of 127 ± 54 μg/g. HWTX-II blocks neuromuscular transmission in the isolated mouse nerve diaphragm preparation and acts cooperatively to potentiate the activity of HWTX I.

==== Effects ====
The toxin can paralyze cockroaches.

=== Huwentoxin-III ===
HWTX-III is a selective inhibitor of insect voltage-gated Na^{+} channels. It has a natural mutant named HWTX-IIIa, the sequence of which is only truncated a tryptophan (Trp33) residue from C-terminal of HWTX-III This mutant does not have the same effects as HWTX-III, suggesting that Trp33 is an important residue related to the biological function of HWTX-III.

==== Chemistry ====
HWTX III contains 33 residues, including six cysteine residues, which form three disulfide bridges. It has a molecular weight of 3853 Da.

==== Mode of action ====
HWTX-III inhibits voltage-gated Na^{+} channels on dorsal unpaired median (DUM) neurons (concentration of toxin at half-maximal inhibition (IC50) ≈1.106 μmol/L) in a similar way as tetrodotoxin (TTX). HWTX-III has no effect on the kinetics of activation and inactivation.

==== Effects ====
HWTX-III showed no effect on the activation and inactivation kinetics of the insect neuron VGSCs, and also no change in the ion selectivity of the channels. However, it can reversibly paralyze cockroaches, depressing the amplitude of the Na^{+} currents on cockroach DUM neurons. HWTX-III is able to enhance smooth muscle reactions elicited by nerve stimulation of the isolated rat vas deferens.

=== Huwentoxin-IV ===
HWTX-IV is an inhibitor of tetrodotoxin (TTX) -sensitive voltage-gated Na^{+} channels.

==== Chemistry ====
HWTX-IV comprises 35 amino acid residues, with three disulfide bridges, belonging to the ICK motif structural family. Its molecular weight is 4108 Da. The C-terminal carboxyl group of this toxin is amidated. The disulfide linkage of HWTX-IV is Cys-2–Cys-17, Cys-9–Cys-24, and Cys-16–Cys-31, adopting a 1–4, 2–5, 3–6 disulfide pattern.

==== Mode of action ====
HWTX-IV specifically blocks neuronal TTX-sensitive voltage-gated Na^{+} channels in adult rat dorsal root ganglion neurons while having no effect on TTX-resistant voltage-gated Na^{+} channels. HWTX-IV inhibits these channels by binding to receptor site 4 and trapping the domain II voltage sensor in the closed configuration. HWTX-IV is a gating modifier that is likely to functionally behave as a simple channel inhibitor. Obvious gating modifier type behavior was only observed in unlikely conditions: extreme depolarizations or very prolonged strong depolarizations.

==== Effects ====
Experiments have revealed that HWTX-IV introduces a significant upgrade to the pain threshold in rats. With HWTX-IV selectively blocking TTX-sensitive voltage-gated Na+ channels (which are involved in the pain pathways), it is hoped that it can be applied in pain therapy. HWTX-IV at high doses elicited no effects in cockroaches. Nor does it target VGSCs in cardiac or skeletal muscle of both amphibians and mammals.

=== Huwentoxin-VII, -VIII ===
HWTX-VII and HWTX-VIII are insecticidal peptides with amino acid sequences and bioactivities similar to that of HWTX-II.

==== Chemistry ====
HWTX-VII and HWTX-VIII are composed of 35 and 36 amino acid residues respectively, both including six cysteines. They might adopt similar structural scaffolding and the same disulfide bridge pattern as HWTX-II.

==== Mode of action ====
Both HWTX-VII and HWTX-VIII block neuromuscular transmission in the isolated mouse phrenic nerve-diaphraghm preparation and act cooperatively with HWTX-I.

==== Effects ====
Both toxins paralyze locusts and kill mice through intracerebroventricular injection.

== See also ==
- Conotoxin
- Spider toxin
