= Chinese bird spider =

Chinese bird spider is an English name given to several species of old-world tarantulas which are found in China and Vietnam, including:

- Cyriopagopus hainanus, primarily found on Hainan Island, off the southeastern coast of China; synonym Haplopelma hainanum
- Cyriopagopus schmidti, found in Vietnam; synonyms Haplopelma schmidti, Haplopelma huwenum and Selenocosmia huwena
