= Vanillotoxin =

Vanillotoxin-1
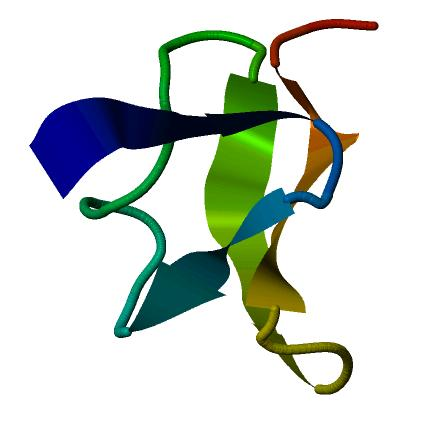

Names
- Other names Tau-theraphotoxin-Pc1a, VaTx1

Identifiers
3D model (JSmol)	-1: Interactive image; -2: Interactive image; -3: Interactive image
ChemSpider	none
IUPHAR/BPS	-1: 5542; -2: 5543; -3: 5544
- InChI: -1: InChI=1S/C173H245N45O50S8/c1-85(2)55-112-152(248)201-116(60-93-38-42-98(224)43-39-93)156(252)202-117(61-94-40-44-99(225)45-41-94)157(253)213-127(165(261)189-88(7)143(239)199-118(62-95-68-182-103-33-20-18-31-100(95)103)158(254)206-121(65-137(232)233)147(243)187-74-135(229)217-140(89(8)222)171(267)198-111(142(177)238)58-91-27-14-12-15-28-91)79-272-276-83-131-170(266)216-130-82-275-274-80-128(212-151(247)108(46-47-136(230)231)192-144(240)102(176)75-219)167(263)195-107(37-26-52-181-173(178)179)150(246)204-119(63-96-69-183-104-34-21-19-32-101(96)104)159(255)203-115(59-92-29-16-13-17-30-92)155(251)197-110(49-54-270-11)145(241)185-71-132(226)184-72-133(227)191-126(166(262)208-122(66-138(234)235)161(257)211-125(77-221)164(260)218-141(90(9)223)172(268)209-114(57-87(5)6)153(249)207-123(67-139(236)237)162(258)214-131)78-271-273-81-129(168(264)193-105(35-22-24-50-174)148(244)196-109(48-53-269-10)146(242)186-73-134(228)190-112)215-163(259)124(76-220)210-154(250)113(56-86(3)4)200-160(256)120(64-97-70-180-84-188-97)205-149(245)106(194-169(130)265)36-23-25-51-175/h12-21,27-34,38-45,68-70,84-90,102,105-131,140-141,182-183,219-225H,22-26,35-37,46-67,71-83,174-176H2,1-11H3,(H2,177,238)(H,180,188)(H,184,226)(H,185,241)(H,186,242)(H,187,243)(H,189,261)(H,190,228)(H,191,227)(H,192,240)(H,193,264)(H,194,265)(H,195,263)(H,196,244)(H,197,251)(H,198,267)(H,199,239)(H,200,256)(H,201,248)(H,202,252)(H,203,255)(H,204,246)(H,205,245)(H,206,254)(H,207,249)(H,208,262)(H,209,268)(H,210,250)(H,211,257)(H,212,247)(H,213,253)(H,214,258)(H,215,259)(H,216,266)(H,217,229)(H,218,260)(H,230,231)(H,232,233)(H,234,235)(H,236,237)(H4,178,179,181)/t88-,89+,90+,102-,105-,106-,107-,108-,109-,110-,111-,112-,113-,114-,115-,116-,117-,118-,119-,120-,121-,122-,123-,124-,125-,126-,127-,128-,129-,130-,131-,140-,141-/m0/s1 Key: RXRVLNDKXAOPHX-ZWNIUGCHSA-N; -2: InChI=1S/C164H235N45O49S7/c1-79(2)49-103-138(233)176-65-124(217)175-66-125(218)183-117-72-260-263-75-120-159(254)185-97(35-22-24-45-165)140(235)188-101(44-48-259-11)137(232)177-67-126(219)182-104(50-80(3)4)144(239)198-112(59-130(225)226)151(246)194-107(54-88-38-40-92(215)41-39-88)147(242)204-118(156(251)181-83(8)136(231)190-108(55-89-62-173-95-33-20-18-31-93(89)95)148(243)197-111(58-129(223)224)139(234)178-68-127(220)208-132(84(9)213)162(257)189-102(134(168)229)52-86-27-14-12-15-28-86)73-261-265-77-122(205-152(247)113(60-131(227)228)199-153(248)115(70-211)202-163(258)133(85(10)214)209-155(250)116(71-212)200-142(237)98(184-157(117)252)36-23-25-46-166)161(256)207-121(160(255)187-100(42-43-128(221)222)143(238)196-110(57-91-64-171-78-179-91)150(245)192-105(51-81(5)6)145(240)201-114(69-210)154(249)206-120)76-264-262-74-119(203-135(230)82(7)180-123(216)61-167)158(253)186-99(37-26-47-172-164(169)170)141(236)195-109(56-90-63-174-96-34-21-19-32-94(90)96)149(244)193-106(146(241)191-103)53-87-29-16-13-17-30-87/h12-21,27-34,38-41,62-64,78-85,97-122,132-133,173-174,210-215H,22-26,35-37,42-61,65-77,165-167H2,1-11H3,(H2,168,229)(H,171,179)(H,175,217)(H,176,233)(H,177,232)(H,178,234)(H,180,216)(H,181,251)(H,182,219)(H,183,218)(H,184,252)(H,185,254)(H,186,253)(H,187,255)(H,188,235)(H,189,257)(H,190,231)(H,191,241)(H,192,245)(H,193,244)(H,194,246)(H,195,236)(H,196,238)(H,197,243)(H,198,239)(H,199,248)(H,200,237)(H,201,240)(H,202,258)(H,203,230)(H,204,242)(H,205,247)(H,206,249)(H,207,256)(H,208,220)(H,209,250)(H,221,222)(H,223,224)(H,225,226)(H,227,228)(H4,169,170,172)/t82-,83-,84+,85+,97-,98-,99-,100-,101-,102-,103-,104-,105-,106-,107-,108-,109-,110-,111-,112-,113-,114-,115-,116-,117-,118-,119-,120-,121-,122-,132-,133-/m0/s1 Key: UPLRCWJFIYOZKF-QTQHHIRPSA-N; -3: InChI=1S/C184H242N48O54S6/c1-89(2)55-120-155(258)199-75-143(239)198-76-144(240)204-136-81-287-289-84-139-182(285)223-130(66-100-74-192-88-202-100)173(276)226-135(80-235)177(280)217-124(60-94-35-39-102(237)40-36-94)167(270)221-125(61-95-69-194-108-27-14-10-23-103(95)108)168(271)209-116(44-50-148(246)247)159(262)219-128(64-98-72-197-111-30-17-13-26-106(98)111)171(274)231-140(181(284)215-122(57-91(5)6)165(268)220-127(63-97-71-196-110-29-16-12-25-105(97)110)170(273)224-131(67-151(252)253)156(259)200-77-145(241)203-133(78-233)175(278)212-119(153(188)256)58-92-21-8-7-9-22-92)85-291-292-86-141(230-163(266)118(46-52-150(250)251)210-176(279)134(79-234)227-174(277)132(68-152(254)255)225-161(264)115(43-49-147(244)245)207-157(260)112(205-178(136)281)31-18-19-53-185)183(286)232-138(180(283)211-117(45-51-149(248)249)160(263)222-129(65-99-73-191-87-201-99)172(275)214-121(56-90(3)4)164(267)208-114(162(265)229-139)42-47-142(187)238)83-290-288-82-137(228-154(257)107(186)41-48-146(242)243)179(282)206-113(32-20-54-193-184(189)190)158(261)218-126(62-96-70-195-109-28-15-11-24-104(96)109)169(272)216-123(166(269)213-120)59-93-33-37-101(236)38-34-93/h7-17,21-30,33-40,69-74,87-91,107,112-141,194-197,233-237H,18-20,31-32,41-68,75-86,185-186H2,1-6H3,(H2,187,238)(H2,188,256)(H,191,201)(H,192,202)(H,198,239)(H,199,258)(H,200,259)(H,203,241)(H,204,240)(H,205,281)(H,206,282)(H,207,260)(H,208,267)(H,209,271)(H,210,279)(H,211,283)(H,212,278)(H,213,269)(H,214,275)(H,215,284)(H,216,272)(H,217,280)(H,218,261)(H,219,262)(H,220,268)(H,221,270)(H,222,263)(H,223,285)(H,224,273)(H,225,264)(H,226,276)(H,227,277)(H,228,257)(H,229,265)(H,230,266)(H,231,274)(H,232,286)(H,242,243)(H,244,245)(H,246,247)(H,248,249)(H,250,251)(H,252,253)(H,254,255)(H4,189,190,193)/t107-,112-,113-,114-,115-,116-,117-,118-,119-,120-,121-,122-,123-,124-,125-,126-,127-,128-,129-,130-,131-,132-,133-,134-,135-,136-,137-,138-,139-,140-,141-/m0/s1 Key: KUMJPNKYKZAIIW-OSPWSWGCSA-N
- SMILES: -1: N[C@@]([H])(CO)C(=O)N[C@@]([H])(CCC(=O)O)C(=O)N[C@@]([H])(CS3)C(=O)N[C@@]([H])(CCCNC(=N)N)C(=O)N[C@@]([H])(CC(=CN2)C1=C2C=CC=C1)C(=O)N[C@@]([H])(Cc1ccccc1)C(=O)N[C@@]([H])(CCSC)C(=O)NCC(=O)NCC(=O)N[C@@]([H])(CS4)C(=O)N[C@@]([H])(CC(=O)O)C(=O)N[C@@]([H])(CO)C(=O)N[C@@]([H])([C@]([H])(O)C)C(=O)N[C@@]([H])(CC(C)C)C(=O)N[C@@]([H])(CC(=O)O)C(=O)N[C@@]([H])(CS5)C(=O)N[C@@]([H])(CS3)C(=O)N[C@@]([H])(CCCCN)C(=O)N[C@@]([H])(CC1=CN=C-N1)C(=O)N[C@@]([H])(CC(C)C)C(=O)N[C@@]([H])(CO)C(=O)N[C@@]([H])(CS4)C(=O)N[C@@]([H])(CCCCN)C(=O)N[C@@]([H])(CCSC)C(=O)NCC(=O)N[C@@]([H])(CC(C)C)C(=O)N[C@@]([H])(Cc1ccc(O)cc1)C(=O)N[C@@]([H])(Cc1ccc(O)cc1)C(=O)N[C@@]([H])(CS5)C(=O)N[C@@]([H])(C)C(=O)N[C@@]([H])(CC(=CN2)C1=C2C=CC=C1)C(=O)N[C@@]([H])(CC(=O)O)C(=O)NCC(=O)N[C@@]([H])([C@]([H])(O)C)C(=O)N[C@@]([H])(Cc1ccccc1)C(=O)N; -2: NCC(=O)N[C@@]([H])(C)C(=O)N[C@@]([H])(CS3)C(=O)N[C@@]([H])(CCCNC(=N)N)C(=O)N[C@@]([H])(CC(=CN2)C1=C2C=CC=C1)C(=O)N[C@@]([H])(Cc1ccccc1)C(=O)N[C@@]([H])(CC(C)C)C(=O)NCC(=O)NCC(=O)N[C@@]([H])(CS4)C(=O)N[C@@]([H])(CCCCN)C(=O)N[C@@]([H])(CO)C(=O)N[C@@]([H])([C@]([H])(O)C)C(=O)N[C@@]([H])(CO)C(=O)N[C@@]([H])(CC(=O)O)C(=O)N[C@@]([H])(CS5)C(=O)N[C@@]([H])(CS3)C(=O)N[C@@]([H])(CCC(=O)O)C(=O)N[C@@]([H])(CC1=CN=C-N1)C(=O)N[C@@]([H])(CC(C)C)C(=O)N[C@@]([H])(CO)C(=O)N[C@@]([H])(CS4)C(=O)N[C@@]([H])(CCCCN)C(=O)N[C@@]([H])(CCSC)C(=O)NCC(=O)N[C@@]([H])(CC(C)C)C(=O)N[C@@]([H])(CC(=O)O)C(=O)N[C@@]([H])(Cc1ccc(O)cc1)C(=O)N[C@@]([H])(CS5)C(=O)N[C@@]([H])(C)C(=O)N[C@@]([H])(CC(=CN2)C1=C2C=CC=C1)C(=O)N[C@@]([H])(CC(=O)O)C(=O)NCC(=O)N[C@@]([H])([C@]([H])(O)C)C(=O)N[C@@]([H])(Cc1ccccc1)C(=O)N; -3: N[C@@]([H])(CCC(=O)O)C(=O)N[C@@]([H])(CS3)C(=O)N[C@@]([H])(CCCNC(=N)N)C(=O)N[C@@]([H])(CC(=CN2)C1=C2C=CC=C1)C(=O)N[C@@]([H])(Cc1ccc(O)cc1)C(=O)N[C@@]([H])(CC(C)C)C(=O)NCC(=O)NCC(=O)N[C@@]([H])(CS4)C(=O)N[C@@]([H])(CCCCN)C(=O)N[C@@]([H])(CCC(=O)O)C(=O)N[C@@]([H])(CC(=O)O)C(=O)N[C@@]([H])(CO)C(=O)N[C@@]([H])(CCC(=O)O)C(=O)N[C@@]([H])(CS5)C(=O)N[C@@]([H])(CS3)C(=O)N[C@@]([H])(CCC(=O)O)C(=O)N[C@@]([H])(CC1=CN=C-N1)C(=O)N[C@@]([H])(CC(C)C)C(=O)N[C@@]([H])(CCC(=O)N)C(=O)N[C@@]([H])(CS4)C(=O)N[C@@]([H])(CC1=CN=C-N1)C(=O)N[C@@]([H])(CO)C(=O)N[C@@]([H])(Cc1ccc(O)cc1)C(=O)N[C@@]([H])(CC(=CN2)C1=C2C=CC=C1)C(=O)N[C@@]([H])(CCC(=O)O)C(=O)N[C@@]([H])(CC(=CN2)C1=C2C=CC=C1)C(=O)N[C@@]([H])(CS5)C(=O)N[C@@]([H])(CC(C)C)C(=O)N[C@@]([H])(CC(=CN2)C1=C2C=CC=C1)C(=O)N[C@@]([H])(CC(=O)O)C(=O)NCC(=O)N[C@@]([H])(CO)C(=O)N[C@@]([H])(Cc1ccccc1)C(=O)N

Properties
Molar mass	4008.5 g/mol
- Except where otherwise noted, data are given for materials in their standard state (at 25 °C [77 °F], 100 kPa). Infobox references

Vanillotoxins (VaTxs, subtypes VaTx1, VaTx2, and VaTx3) are neurotoxins found in the venom of the tarantula Psalmopoeus cambridgei. They act as agonists for the transient receptor potential cation channel subfamily V member 1 (TRPV1), activating the pain sensory system. VaTx1 and 2 also act as antagonists for the K_{v}2-type voltage-gated potassium channel (K_{v}2), inducing paralytic behavior in small animals.

== Origin ==
P. cambridgei, a tarantula from Trinidad, uses its venom to paralyze its prey. Amongst other compounds, this venom contains all three subtypes of VaTxs: VaTx1, VaTx2, and VaTx3. The name of the toxin was derived from the vanilloid receptor TRPV1, to which the VaTxs bind.

== Chemistry ==
Vanillotoxins have close homology to other inhibitor cystine knot (ICK) toxins. ICK toxins are best known as blockers of cation channels. The exact structure of the VaTxs has not yet been deduced, although some preliminary models have been proposed. VaTxs are 53-82% identical in amino acid sequence. VaTx1 and VaTx2 have an almost identical structure, while VaTx3 shows some diversity in its extruding protein loop.

== Targets ==
All three subtypes of VaTxs act as agonists for TRPV1.EC50 of VaTx1, VaTx2, and VaTx3 for heterologously expressed TRPV1 channels is around 12, 2.5 and 0.3 μM, respectively. VaTx1 and VaTx2 also bind to the K_{v}2 channel, although VaTx2 with a lower affinity than VaTx1. VaTx2 becomes effective on Kv2 at a minimal concentration of 40 μM.

== Mode of action ==
In humans, the effect of VaTxs has not been systematically studied. In general, the venom of P. cambridgei is known to produce pain, but the amount of toxin that is present in a bite is too low to cause serious health problems . The effects of VaTxs on TRPV1 and K_{v}2 have been studied by injecting VaTxs subcutaneously in mice. VaTxs bind to the extracellular pore domain of TRPV1 in the peripheral nervous system causing the opening of the pore and cation influx, therefore triggering the activation of the pain system. Despite the similar architecture of TRPV1 and K_{v}2, VaTx1 and VaTx2 bind to the voltage-sensing domain of K_{v}2 rather than the pore-domain. By doing so, they increase the action potential threshold in the neuromuscular junction, eliciting paralytic behavior.
