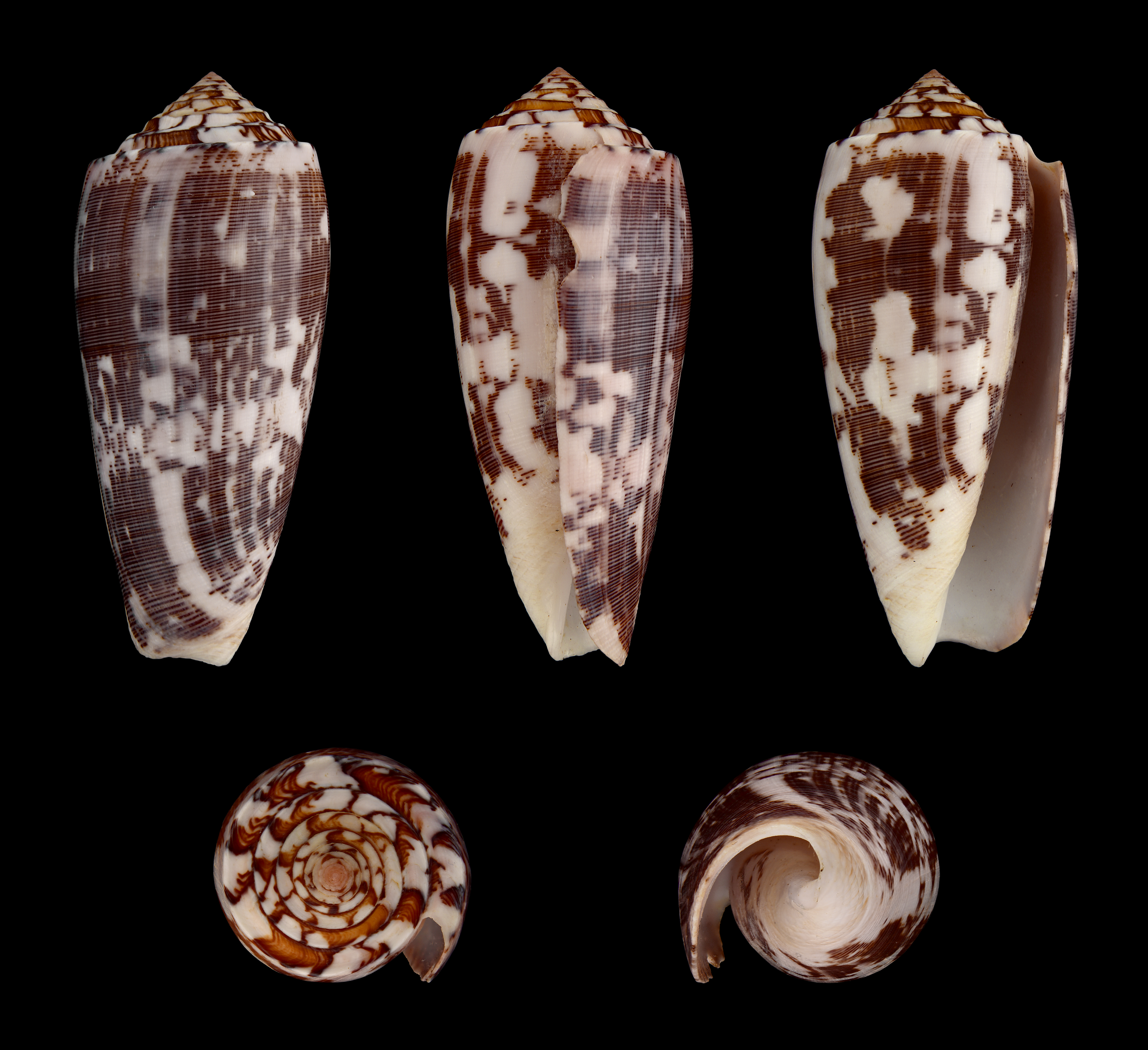
- A shell of Conus striatus

Conservation status
- Least Concern (IUCN 3.1)

Scientific classification
- Kingdom: Animalia
- Phylum: Mollusca
- Class: Gastropoda
- Subclass: Caenogastropoda
- Order: Neogastropoda
- Superfamily: Conoidea
- Family: Conidae
- Genus: Conus
- Species: C. striatus

Binomial name
- Conus striatus Linnaeus, 1758

Synonyms
- Conus (Pionoconus) striatus (Linnaeus, 1758) · accepted, alternate representation; Conus chusaki da Motta, 1978; Conus floridus G. B. Sowerby II, 1858; Conus huberi Thach, 2018; Conus leoninus Lightfoot, 1786; Hermes striatus (Linnaeus, 1758); Pionoconus striatus (Linnaeus, 1758)

= Conus striatus =

Species of sea snail

Conus striatus, common name the striated cone, is a species of sea snail, a marine gastropod mollusk in the family Conidae, the cone snails and their allies.

These snails are predatory and venomous. While they are piscivorous (eat fishes), they are capable of stinging humans, therefore live ones should be handled carefully or not at all.

Subspecies

- Conus striatus juliaallaryae (Cossignani, 2013) (synonym: Pionoconus striatus juliaallaryae Cossignani, 2013)
- Conus striatus oahuensis (Tucker, Tenorio & Chaney, 2011) (synonym: Pionoconus striatus oahuensis Tucker, Tenorio & Chaney, 2011)
- Conus striatus striatus Linnaeus, 1758 (synonyms: Conus subfloridus da Motta, 1985; Pionoconus striatus striatus (Linnaeus, 1758))

== Description ==
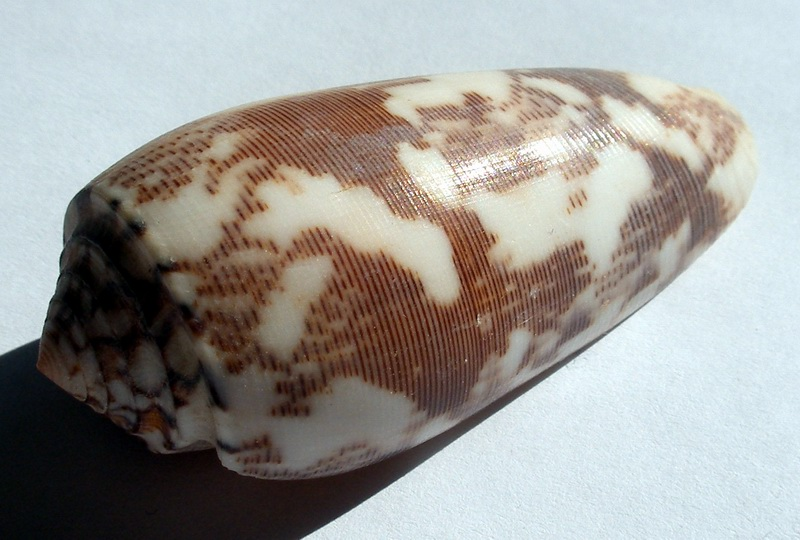
Abapertural view of the shell of Conus striatus

The large, slim shell has a varying length between 44 mm and 129 mm. It is irregularly clouded with pink-white and chestnut or chocolate, with fine close revolving striae, forming the darker ground-color by close colored lines. The pointed spire is tessellated with chestnut or chocolate brown and white. Its shoulders are rounded and its sutures deep. The whorls are slightly channeled, carinate and striate. The outer lip shows a pronounced posterior flare.

== Distribution ==
This species occurs in the Red Sea, in the Indian Ocean off the Aldabra Atoll, Madagascar, the Mascarene Basin, Mauritius and Tanzania; in the Pacific Ocean off the Philippines, Australia (Northern Territory, Queensland, Western Australia), New Zealand, New Caledonia and Thailand.

It also occurs in the Hawaiian islands. Subspecies juliaallaryae also occurs in the Persian Gulf.

== Gallery ==
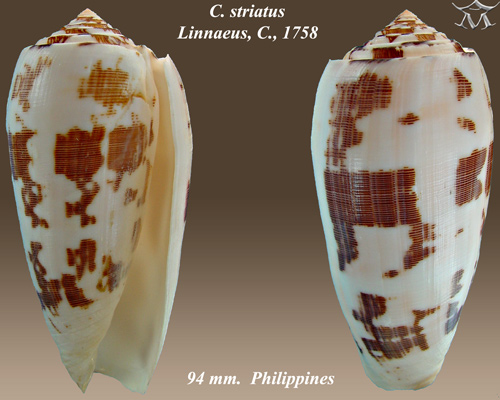
Conus striatus Linnaeus, C., 1758

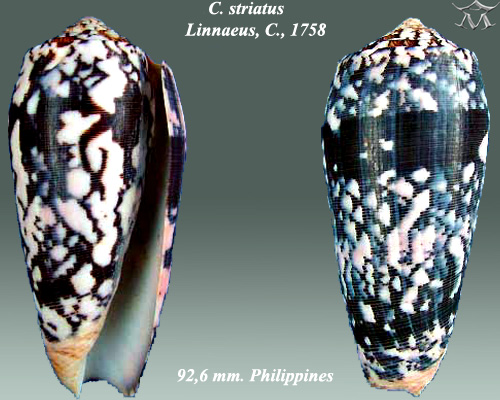
Conus striatus Linnaeus, C., 1758

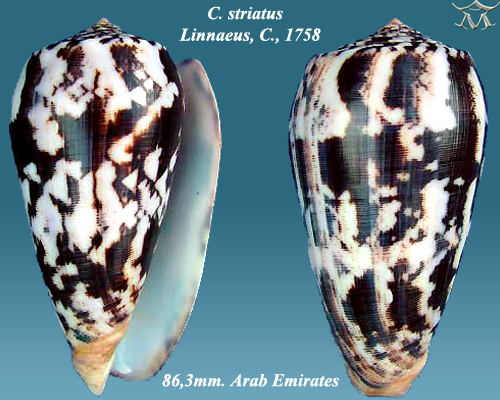
Conus striatus Linnaeus, C., 1758

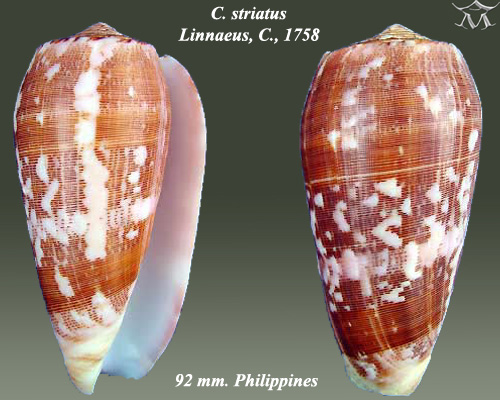
Conus striatus Linnaeus, C., 1758
