= Inhibitor cystine knot =

Protein structural motif

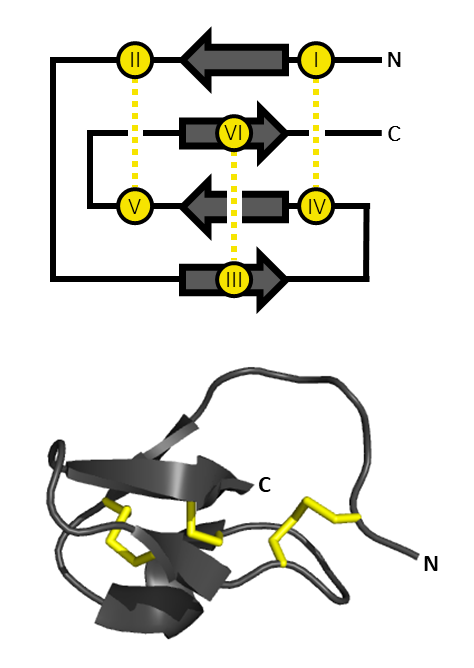
Top: general schematic of the structure of a knottin. A macrocyclic knot is formed by the core of beta strands (arrows) and disulfide bonds (yellow connections between numbered cysteines). Knottins are differentiated from GFCKs by the connectivity of their cysteines. Bottom: The general structure is easily seen in this crystal structure of EETI II taken from the protein database (PDB: 2IT7).

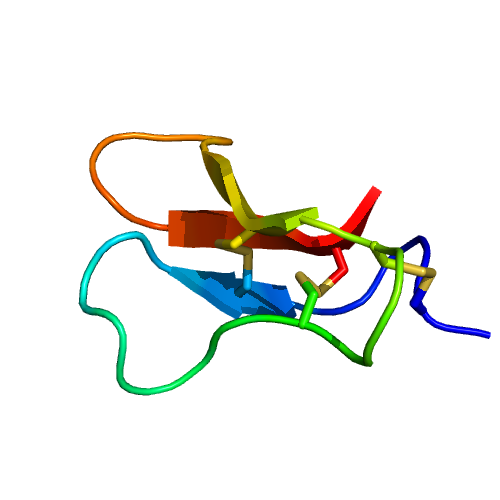
MCh-1: A plant inhibitor cystine knot peptide from Momordica charantia. PDB entry 2m2q.

An inhibitor cystine knot (also known as ICK or Knottin) is a protein structural motif containing three disulfide bridges. Knottins are one of three folds in the cystine knot motif; the other closely related knots are the growth factor cystine knot (GFCK) and the cyclic cystine knot (CCK; cyclotide). Types include a) cyclic mobius, b) cyclic bracelet and c) acyclic inhibitor knottins. Cystine knot motifs are found frequently in nature in a plethora of plants, animals, and fungi and serve diverse functions from appetite suppression to anti-fungal activity.

Along with the sections of polypeptide between them, two disulfides form a loop through which the third disulfide bond (linking the third and sixth cysteines in the sequence) passes, forming a knot. The motif is common in invertebrate toxins such as those from arachnids and molluscs. The motif is also found in some inhibitor proteins found in plants, but the plant and animal motifs are thought to be a product of convergent evolution. The ICK motif is a very stable protein structure which is resistant to heat denaturation and proteolysis. CK peptide components of venoms target voltage-gated ion channels but members of the family also act as antibacterial and haemolytic agents. Plant ICK proteins are often protease inhibitors.

Knottins have high stability to pH, heat, and enzymes. Because of their stability and their favorable pharmacodynamic properties, knottins are becoming increasingly popular as protein engineering scaffolds. Moreover, engineered knottins have shown significant promise as therapeutics, imaging agents, and targeting agents for chemotherapy.

The mammalian proteins Agouti signalling peptide and Agouti related peptide are the only known mammalian examples of this motif. Both are neuropeptides involved in cell signalling. The former is responsible for hair (fur) colouration.

The motif is similar to the cyclic cystine knot or cyclotide, but lacks the cyclisation of the polypeptide backbone which is present in the latter family. The growth factor cystine knot (GFCK) is similar to the ICK but its topology is such that it is the bond between the first and fourth disulfide which threads through the loop.

== Proteins which contain the ICK motif ==
- Agouti related peptide
- Agouti signalling peptide
- Albumin I
- Covalitoxin-II
- DkTx
- Grammotoxin
- GsMTx-4
- Guangxitoxin
- Hainantoxin
- Hanatoxin
- Heteroscodratoxin-1
- Huwentoxin
- Maurocalcine
- Theraphosa leblondi toxin
- δ-Palutoxin
- Phrixotoxin
- Psalmotoxin
- Robustoxin
- Stromatoxin
- Tachystatin
- Vanillotoxin
- Vejocalcin
