= KCND2 =

Protein-coding gene in the species Homo sapiens

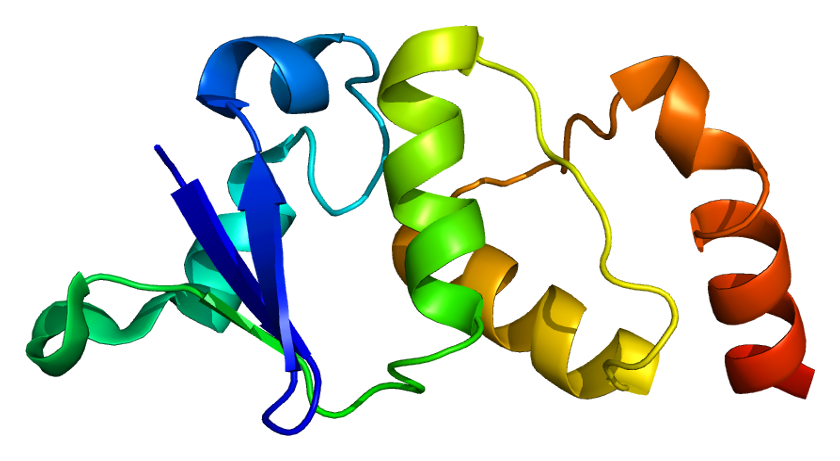

Identifiers
- Aliases: KCND2, KV4.2, RK5, potassium voltage-gated channel subfamily D member 2
- External IDs: OMIM: 605410; MGI: 102663; GeneCards: KCND2

Gene location (Human)
Chr.	Chromosome 7 (human)
Band	7q31.31	Start	120,273,175 bp
Band	7q31.31	End	120,750,337 bp

Gene location (Mouse)
Chr.	Chromosome 6 (mouse)
Band	6 A2- A3.1|6 8.49 cM	Start	21,215,502 bp
Band	6 A2- A3.1|6 8.49 cM	End	21,729,804 bp
RNA expression pattern
Bgee	Human / Mouse (ortholog); Top expressed in: cerebellar vermis; paraflocculus of cerebellum; lateral nuclear group of thalamus; pons; stromal cell of endometrium; right hemisphere of cerebellum; Brodmann area 23; prefrontal cortex; primary visual cortex; ganglionic eminence / Top expressed in: lobe of cerebellum; habenula; cerebellar vermis; toe; medial geniculate nucleus; medial dorsal nucleus; third toe; olfactory tubercle; nucleus accumbens; lateral geniculate nucleus; More reference expression data
BioGPS	n/a
Gene ontology
Molecular function	potassium channel activity; metal ion binding; voltage-gated ion channel activity; ion channel activity; protein binding; A-type (transient outward) potassium channel activity; voltage-gated potassium channel activity; voltage-gated ion channel activity involved in regulation of postsynaptic membrane potential
Cellular component	integral component of membrane; perikaryon; postsynaptic membrane; cell projection; membrane; plasma membrane raft; intrinsic component of plasma membrane; voltage-gated potassium channel complex; plasma membrane; dendritic spine; synapse; integral component of plasma membrane; neuronal cell body membrane; cell junction; soma; dendrite; glutamatergic synapse; GABA-ergic synapse; integral component of postsynaptic membrane; integral component of postsynaptic specialization membrane; postsynaptic density
Biological process	chemical synaptic transmission; regulation of ion transmembrane transport; ion transport; potassium ion transport; transmembrane transport; potassium ion transmembrane transport; action potential; sensory perception of pain; protein homooligomerization; cellular response to hypoxia; neuronal action potential; locomotor rhythm; regulation of postsynaptic membrane potential; cardiac conduction
Sources:Amigo / QuickGO
Orthologs
Databases	NCBI: entry; OMA: entry
Species	Human	Mouse
Entrez	3751	16508
Ensembl	ENSG00000184408	ENSMUSG00000060882
UniProt	Q9NZV8	Q9Z0V2
RefSeq (mRNA)	NM_012281	NM_019697
RefSeq (protein)	NP_036413	NP_062671
Location (UCSC)	Chr 7: 120.27 – 120.75 Mb	Chr 6: 21.22 – 21.73 Mb
PubMed search
- Wikidata
View/Edit Human	View/Edit Mouse

Potassium voltage-gated channel subfamily D member 2 is a protein that in humans is encoded by the KCND2 gene. It contributes to the cardiac transient outward potassium current (I_{to1}), the main contributing current to the repolarizing phase 1 of the cardiac action potential.

== Description ==
Voltage-gated potassium (Kv) channels represent the most complex class of voltage-gated ion channels from both functional and structural standpoints. Their diverse functions include regulating neurotransmitter release, heart rate, insulin secretion, neuronal excitability, epithelial electrolyte transport, smooth muscle contraction, and cell volume. Four sequence-related potassium channel genes - shaker, shaw, shab, and shal - have been identified in Drosophila, and each has been shown to have human homolog(s). This gene encodes a member of the potassium channel, voltage-gated, shal-related subfamily, members of which form voltage-activated A-type potassium ion channels and are prominent in the repolarization phase of the action potential. This member mediates a rapidly inactivating, A-type outward potassium current which is not under the control of the N terminus as it is in Shaker channels.

== Interactions ==
KCND2 has been shown to interact with FLNC.

== See also ==
- Voltage-gated potassium channel
