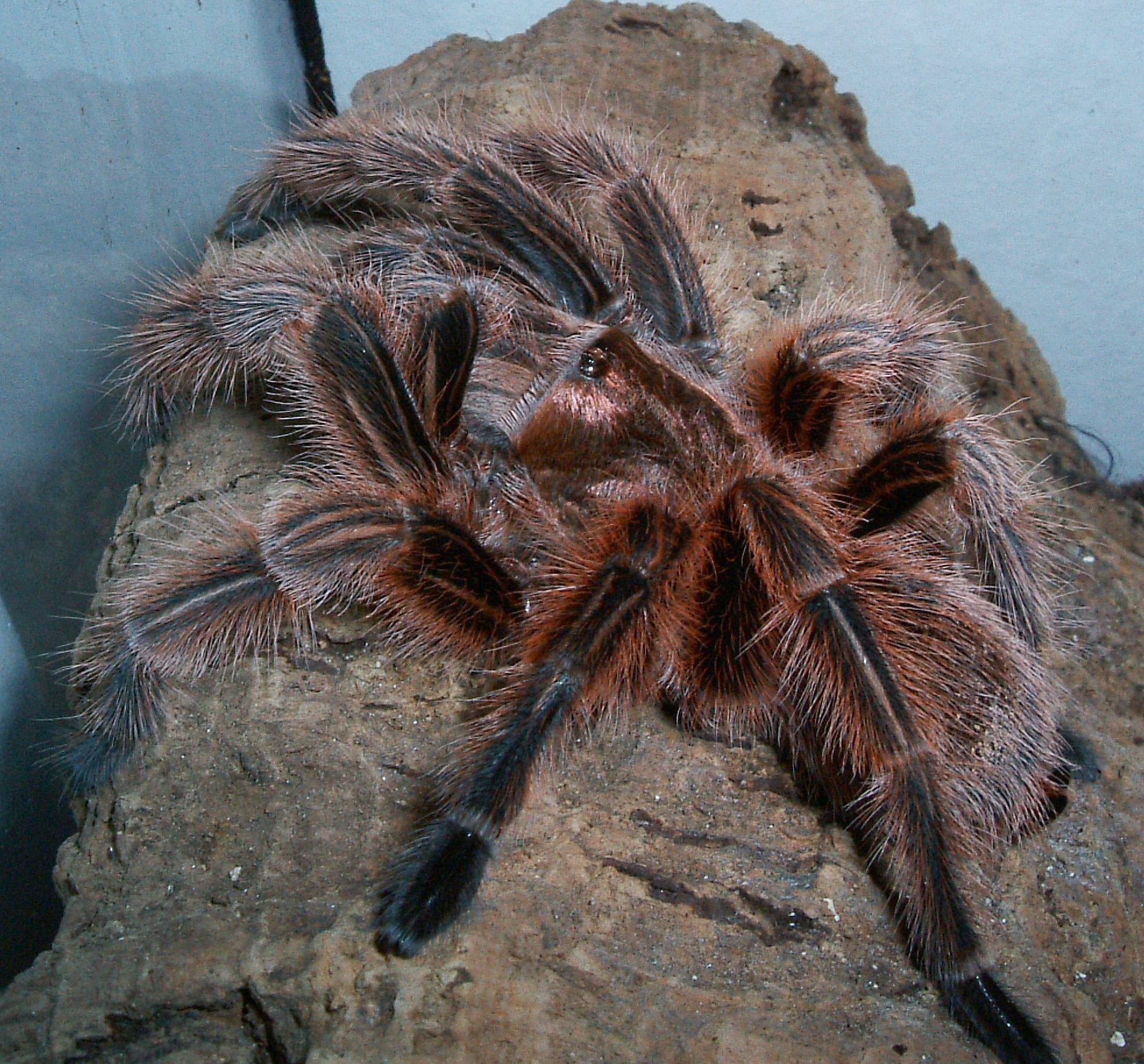

Conservation status
- CITES Appendix II

Scientific classification
- Kingdom: Animalia
- Phylum: Arthropoda
- Subphylum: Chelicerata
- Class: Arachnida
- Order: Araneae
- Infraorder: Mygalomorphae
- Family: Theraphosidae
- Genus: Grammostola
- Species: G. rosea

Binomial name
- Grammostola rosea (Walckenaer, 1837)

Synonyms
- Citharoscelus kochii; Phrixotrichus spatulata; Citharoscelus spatulatus; Grammostola argentinense; Grammostola argentinensis; Grammostola cala; Grammostola porteri; Grammostola spathulata; Grammostola spatulata; Eurypelma rosea; Eurypelma spatulatum; Lasiodora rosea; Mygale rosea; Mygale rubiginosa

= Chilean rose tarantula =

Species of spider

The Chilean rose tarantula (Grammostola rosea), also known as the rose hair tarantula, the Chilean fire tarantula, or the Chilean red-haired tarantula (depending on the color morph), is probably the most common species of tarantula available in American and European pet stores today, due to the large number of wild-caught specimens exported cheaply from their native Chile into the pet trade. The species is also known from Bolivia and Argentina.

G. rosea is a common pet of tarantula hobbyists. Females have been known to live as long as 20 years, but due to the limited time they have been available on the market (and hence for extensive study), they may live considerably longer than 20 years. In the past, considerable confusion existed between this species and Grammostola porteri, but in 2022 the World Spider Catalog revised the latter as a junior synonym of Grammostola rosea.

== Habitat ==
The natural habitat of Grammostola rosea is the high desert and scrub regions of northern Chile, Bolivia, and Argentina. Spiders live at lower altitudes, ranging between 0 and 1,500 meters (0 and 4,921 ft) above sea level. Natural habitats of the Chilean rose tarantula have often been disturbed by human activity, industrialization and urbanization, making exact distribution of the species harder to pinpoint. Though habitat-loss is a threat to the species, they are not endangered and have no wildlife conservation status.

The Chilean rose tarantula usually digs small burrows or finds abandoned reptile or rodent burrows to live in, which it then lines with its silk. The burrows are typically straight-down, with only one or two chambers. Males tend to have burrows underneath more vegetation and plant cover, or under stones; female burrows are less secured but are deeper, reaching 40 cm down. The burrows are occupied by only one spider, as this species lives most of its life solitary. In areas of high population densities, burrows are found to be no closer than 1 meter (3 ft 3 in) apart. Females leave the burrow in short distances only for trapping food and potential mates, while males abandon their burrows to look for mates typically between September and March.

== Diet ==
This tarantula has a diverse diet, including numerous beetles, caterpillars, crickets, cockroaches, grasshoppers, mealworms, silkworms, waxworms and even small lizards and rodents. When tarantulas are kept as pets, the best food that can be provided for them are crickets, that have been pre-fed (gut-loaded) on fresh vegetables, as this is the best source of hydrated nutrition for the tarantula.

== Reproduction ==
Grammostola rosea has two mating seasons: September through March and May through July. In order to reach sexual maturity, the spiders must molt several times over the course of three to four years. Throughout their molting, males develop a hook on their front set of legs, called tibial hooks, that act as a way to hold-up and restrain their female partner during mating. Once a male has reached sexual maturity, he will create a sperm web to deposit his sperm and then place it back into his pedipalps before approaching the female. He eventually approaches the female's burrow with caution, tapping and vibrating his legs to attract her out of her shelter. At the opportune moment, the male lunges himself forward and using his hooks, holds the female's chelicerae, pushing his mate into a vertical position, giving him access to the female's epigyne (external genitalia). The male inserts one (or even both left and right) pedipalp into the female's epigyne and injects the fertilizing fluid. In the weeks following fertilization, provided that the female does not molt, she will spin a web and lay 50 to 200 eggs. Males will die a few months following reproduction.

== Defense mechanisms ==
Grammostola rosea is a venomous spider. However, its main defense mechanism against predators are the urticating hairs located on its abdomen. These hairs are released by the spider brushing them off its back with its leg, which occurs when the spider feels threatened. The urticating hairs disperse into the air, causing irritation and itching when in contact with predator's skin or eyes. The urticating hairs also act as sensory structures, helping the spider identify subtle vibrations or changes in pressure. The Chilean Rose Tarantula's next line of defense is their venom, which is injected into their prey through their fangs. Though not extremely dangerous to humans, the venom contains neurotoxins that disrupt the nervous system and hemotoxins that disrupt the circulatory system. Venom is mainly used for hunting as it also contains enzymes that break down prey into ingestible fluid.

== As pets ==
Grammostola rosea is relatively docile, low-maintenance, and inexpensive, so they are popular as pets, kept in terrariums. Given their natural distribution in northern Chile, G. rosea can be kept in relatively low humidity. They can be kept at temperatures around 25–30 °C (77–86 °F), on a diet of crickets or locusts. The spider can fast for weeks to months at a time. Fasting is sometimes an indication of an upcoming ecdysis (moult).

G. rosea is usually skittish, running away from danger rather than acting defensively, but it may also raise its front legs and present its fangs in preparation to defend itself. It can act especially defensive for days after moulting; this may be innate in the spider's behavior. As with the majority of tarantulas from the Americas, it has small, spine-like urticating hairs on its abdomen that it kicks off or releases when threatened as a defense.

In February 2009, a British man was treated for tarantula hairs lodged in his cornea. The urticating hairs were thrown from the man's pet G. rosea while he was cleaning its tank. Medical authorities urge owners to wear protective eyewear when handling G. rosea. The venom of the Chilean rose tarantula contains multiple toxins, which may help it immobilize and digest prey, as well as deter predators. A specific peptide found in this venom, termed GsMTx4 (Grammostola rosea Mechanotoxin 4), has been shown to inhibit mechanosensitive ion channels in living cells.

In March 5, 2026, G. rosea was added to Appendix II of the Convention on International Trade in Endangered Species of Wild Fauna and Flora, which "includes species not necessarily threatened with extinction, but in which trade must be controlled in order to avoid utilization incompatible with their survival."
