= Buffalo Zoo =

- Interactive map of Buffalo Zoo
- Date opened: 1875
- Location: 300 Parkside Ave, Buffalo, New York, United States
- Land area: 23.5 acres (9.5 ha)
- No. of animals: 1200
- Annual visitors: 400,000
- Memberships: AZA
- Major exhibits: Arctic Edge, Rainforest Falls, Sea Lion Cove, Otter Creek, Vanishing Animals, Rhino Yards, Giraffes, Kookaburra Corner, EcoStation, Heritage Farm (Children's Zoo)
- Public transit: NFTA Metro Rail (Amherst Street station)
- Website: www.buffalozoo.org
- Buffalo Zoo Entrance Court
- U.S. National Register of Historic Places
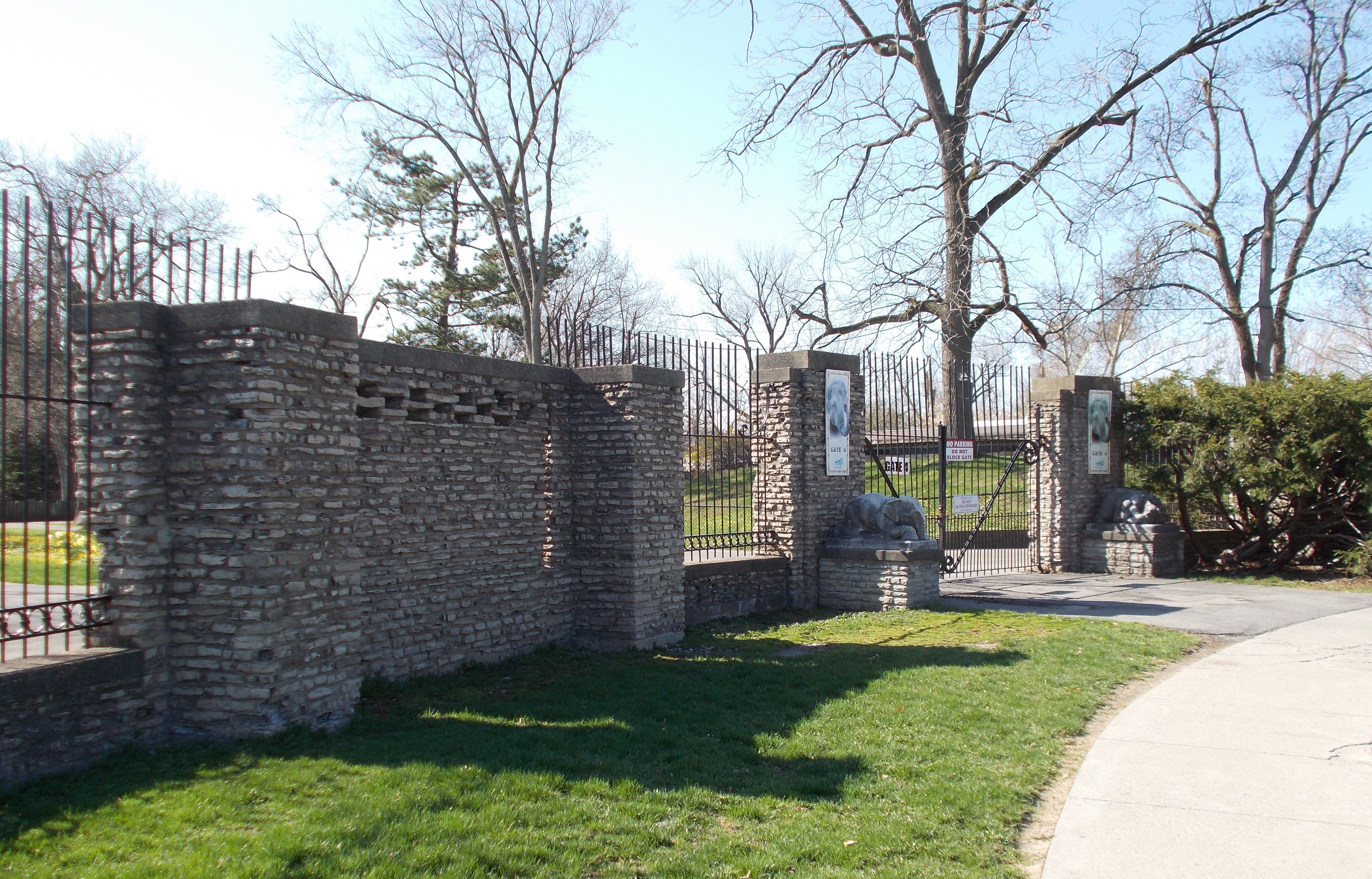
- Buffalo Zoo Entrance Court, April 2013

- Location within New York Location within the United States
- Location: 300 Parkside Ave. Buffalo, New York
- Coordinates: 42.9391°N 78.8536°W
- Area: less than one acre
- Built: 1935-1938
- Architects: Brent, John Edmonston
- NRHP reference No.: 13000305
- Added to NRHP: May 22, 2013

Founded in 1875, the Buffalo Zoo, located at 300 Parkside Ave in Buffalo, New York, is the seventh oldest zoo in the United States. Each year, the Buffalo Zoo welcomes approximately 400,000 visitors and is the second largest tourist attraction in Western New York; second only to Niagara Falls. Located on 23.5 acres (9.5 ha) of Buffalo's Delaware Park, the zoo exhibits a diverse collection of wild and exotic animals, and more than 320 different species of plants. The zoo is open year-round.

== History ==
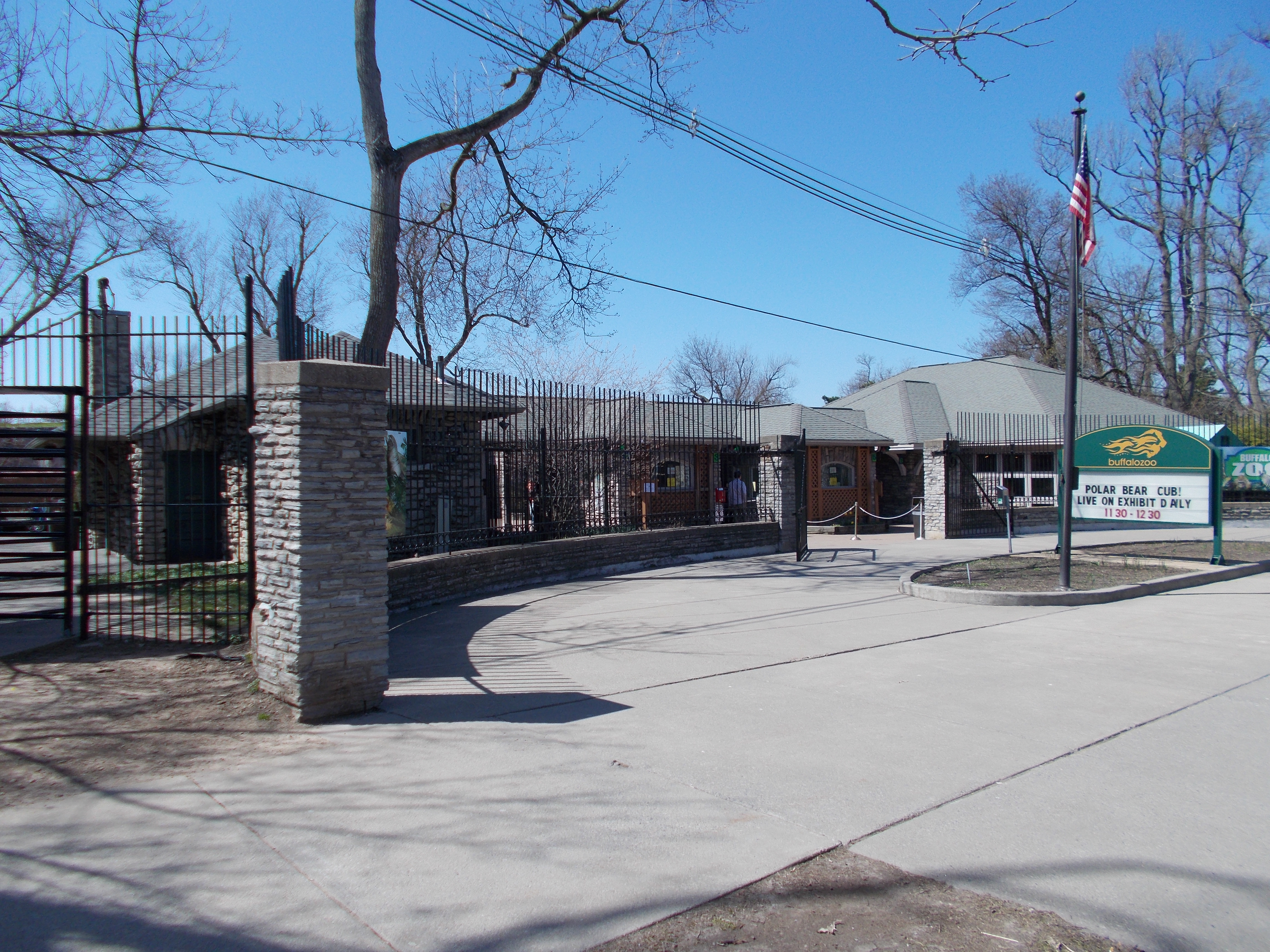
Former zoo entrance on Parkside Ave (new entrance, opened in 2013, is directly off the zoo's parking lot)

The zoo traces its history to the mid-19th century when Jacob E. Bergtold, a Buffalo furrier, presented a pair of deer to the city of Buffalo. To provide the deer with room to graze, Elam R. Jewett, the publisher of the Buffalo Daily Journal, offered to house the deer on his estate. Simultaneously, plans were being made for the municipal North Park (today's Delaware Park), and Mayor William F. Rogers hired landscape architect, Frederick Law Olmsted, to include a zoo as part of the park's design. Five years after, the deer were donated, more animals were added to the collection, and the first permanent building was erected in 1875, officially establishing the Buffalo Zoological Gardens.

The zoo underwent a large expansion during the Great Depression and became a major work site for the Works Progress Administration. Among the new structures was the Buffalo Zoo Entrance Court at Parkside Avenue and Amherst Street. It was designed by African-American architect John Edmonston Brent (son of architect Calvin Brent) and built 1935–1938. The Buffalo Zoo Entrance Court was listed on the National Register of Historic Places in 2013.

Throughout the next several decades, more exhibits and facilities were added, including the Reptile House (1942), Children's Zoo (1965), Giraffe House and Veterinary Hospital (1967), and The Gorilla Habitat Building (1981). The zoo's mission also began to change during the 1980s and 1990s under the direction of Minot Ortolani, as it began reducing the numbers of animals in its collection to focus on the breeding of endangered species that might not otherwise have a chance at survival. In addition to its conservation efforts, the zoo also placed more of an emphasis on education to teach visitors about the animals and their natural habitats. From 2000–2017 the President/CEO of the zoo was Dr Donna M. Fernandes, with Norah B. Fletchall succeeding her in 2017.

In 2002, a 15-year master plan was unveiled to transform the zoo. New visitor amenities and naturalistic habitats were planned, including the Asian River and Highlands Zone, African Watering Hole, Arctic Edge, and the Wonders of Water Children's Zoo. Phase One of the Master Plan has resulted in the opening of the Vanishing Animals exhibit, EcoStation, Otter Creek, and Sea Lion Cove. The completion of Phase One was marked by the September 10, 2008, opening of the South American Rainforest, a four-season attraction that features a two-story waterfall, dozens of colorful birds, and a variety of other rainforest species. In the fall of 2015 the $14 million Arctic Edge opened to the public featuring Arctic wolves, lynxes and polar bears. In 2016 the Arctic wolves were replaced by Arctic foxes which fit the size of the exhibit better than the wolves. Arctic Edge is currently home to two polar bears Anana and Luna. Luna is the offspring of Anana and Nanuq, who now resides at the Columbus Zoo.

In March 2018, the zoo's Reptile House was closed for 14 months to undergo a $3.7 million remodel. It reopened on May 24, 2019, as the Donna M. Fernandes Amphibian and Reptile Center with a new roof, refreshed exhibits, interactive graphics and a conservation room.

In August 2018, the zoo announced it would be sending its two Asian elephants, Jothi and Surapa to the Audubon Zoo in New Orleans due to being unable to care for them anymore. They arrived at the Audubon Zoo later that year. As of 2022, the former elephant habitat is currently occupied by black rhinos.

In early June 2020, a red-footed tortoise was reportedly stolen from the zoo. There was an ongoing police search, but the tortoise, 'Red', was never found.

== Animals ==
Animal species in collection

Mammals

- Addax
- African lion
- American bison
- American Milking Devon cow
- Amur tiger
- Arctic fox
- Axis deer
- Black-and-white ruffed lemur
- Black howler monkey
- Black-capped squirrel monkey
- Brown capuchin
- California sea lion
- Canada lynx
- Capybara
- Cheviot sheep
- Common squirrel monkey
- Common vampire bat
- Eastern black rhinoceros
- Ferret
- Gemsbok
- Giant anteater
- Giraffe
- Golden lion tamarin
- Indian rhinoceros
- Japanese macaque
- Lesser hedgehog tenrec
- Linnaeus's two-toed sloth
- Long-tailed chinchilla
- Meerkat
- Mule
- Naked mole-rat
- Nigerian dwarf goat
- North American porcupine
- North American river otter
- Ocelot
- Patas monkey
- Plains zebra
- Polar bear
- Red panda
- Red-rumped agouti
- Roan antelope
- Rocky Mountain bighorn sheep
- Sand Cat
- Snow leopard
- Southern tamandua
- Southern three-banded armadillo
- Spotted hyena
- Tammar wallaby
- Tufted deer
- Western lowland gorilla
- White-faced saki

Birds

- American kestrel
- Bald eagle
- Black vulture
- Black-crowned night heron
- Blue-crowned motmot
- Boat-billed heron
- Bourke's parrot
- Call duck
- Cinereous vulture
- Cloncurry parrot
- Dominique chicken.
- Eastern rosella
- Eastern screech owl
- Great horned owl
- Green-backed trogon
- Green-winged macaw
- Lady Ross' turaco
- Laughing kookaburra
- Princess parrot
- Roseate spoonbill
- Turtle dove
- Scarlet ibis
- Scarlet macaw
- Senegal parrot
- Sun conure
- Sunbittern
- Swan goose
- Tawny frogmouth
- Trumpeter hornbill
- Western cattle egret
- white-faced whistling duck
- Yellow-crowned night heron
- Von der Decken's hornbill

Reptiles

- Annam leaf turtle
- Arrau turtle
- Ball python
- Black tree monitor
- Blanding's turtle
- Brazilian rainbow boa
- Carpet python
- Chinese crocodile lizard
- Chinese three-striped box turtle
- Chuckwalla
- Caiman Lizard
- Desert grassland whiptail lizard
- Desert tortoise
- Dumeril's monitor
- Eastern box turtle
- Eastern diamondback rattlesnake
- Eastern indigo snake
- Emerald Tree Monitor
- Gila monster
- Gopher tortoise
- Hermann's tortoise
- Indochinese box turtle
- Jamaican boa
- King cobra
- Komodo dragon
- Legless lizard
- Leopard gecko
- Mangrove snake
- Massasauga
- Mata mata
- Mexican beaded lizard
- Mexican lance-headed rattlesnake
- Northern blue-tongued skink
- Pancake tortoise
- Prehensile-tailed skink
- Pueblan milk snake
- Radiated Tortoise
- Red-footed tortoise
- Reticulated python
- Sheltopusik
- Sidewinder
- Spotted turtle
- Tentacled snake
- Virgin Islands boa
- Yellow-spotted river turtle

Amphibians

- Anderson's crocodile newt
- Axolotl
- Cane toad
- Dyeing poison frog
- Green and black poison dart frog
- Hellbender
- Mission golden-eyed tree frog
- Panamanian golden frog
- Puerto Rican crested toad
- Solomon Islands leaf frog
- Yellow-banded poison dart frog

Fish

- Cichlids
- Common pleco
- Magdalena River stingray
- Ocellate river stingray
- Silver dollar fish
- Spotted Rafael catfish

Invertebrates

- Blue death feigning beetle
- Brazilian greysmoke spider
- Chaco goldenknee tarantula
- Chilean rose tarantula

== Gallery ==
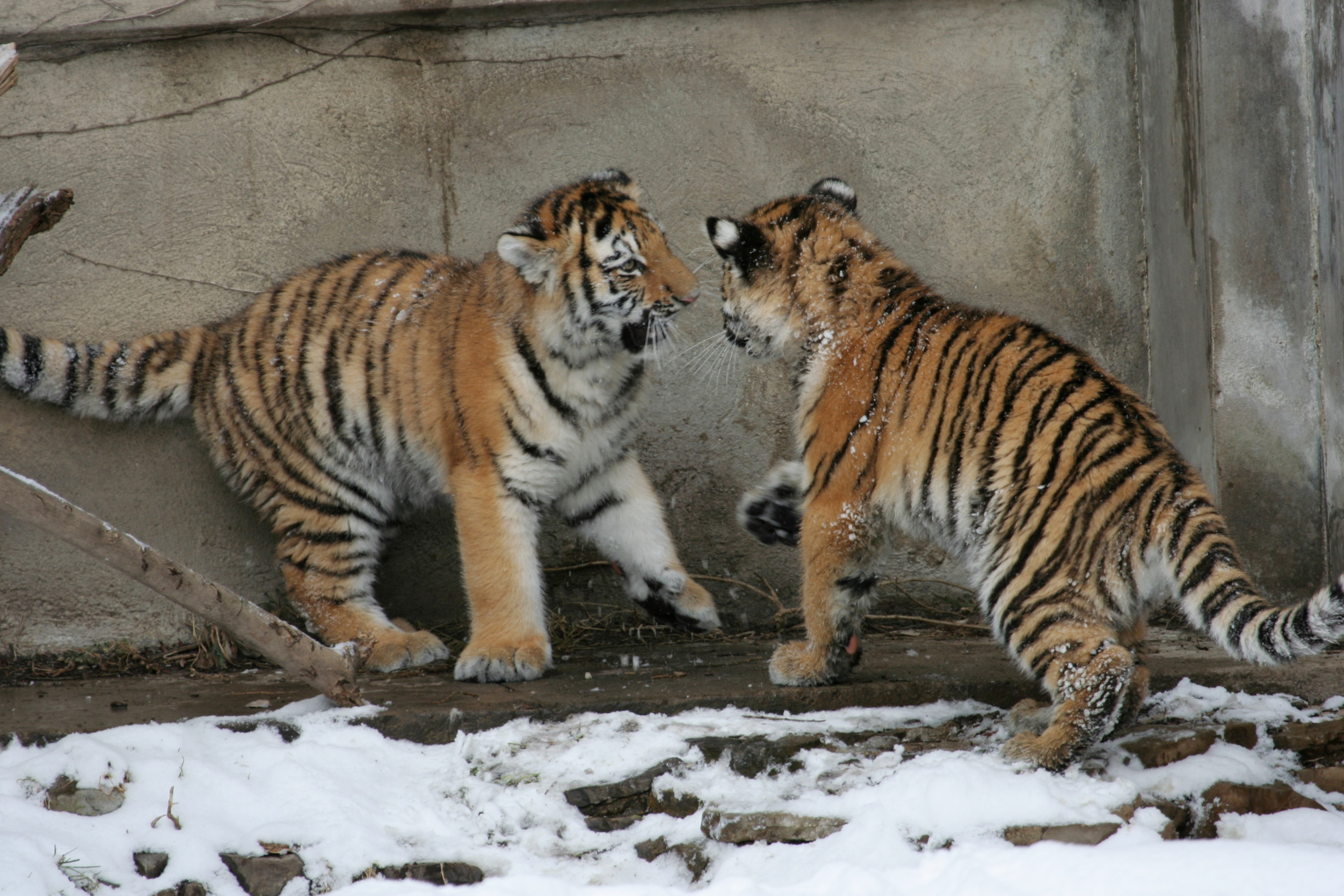
Siberian tiger cubs playing in the snow at the Buffalo Zoo.

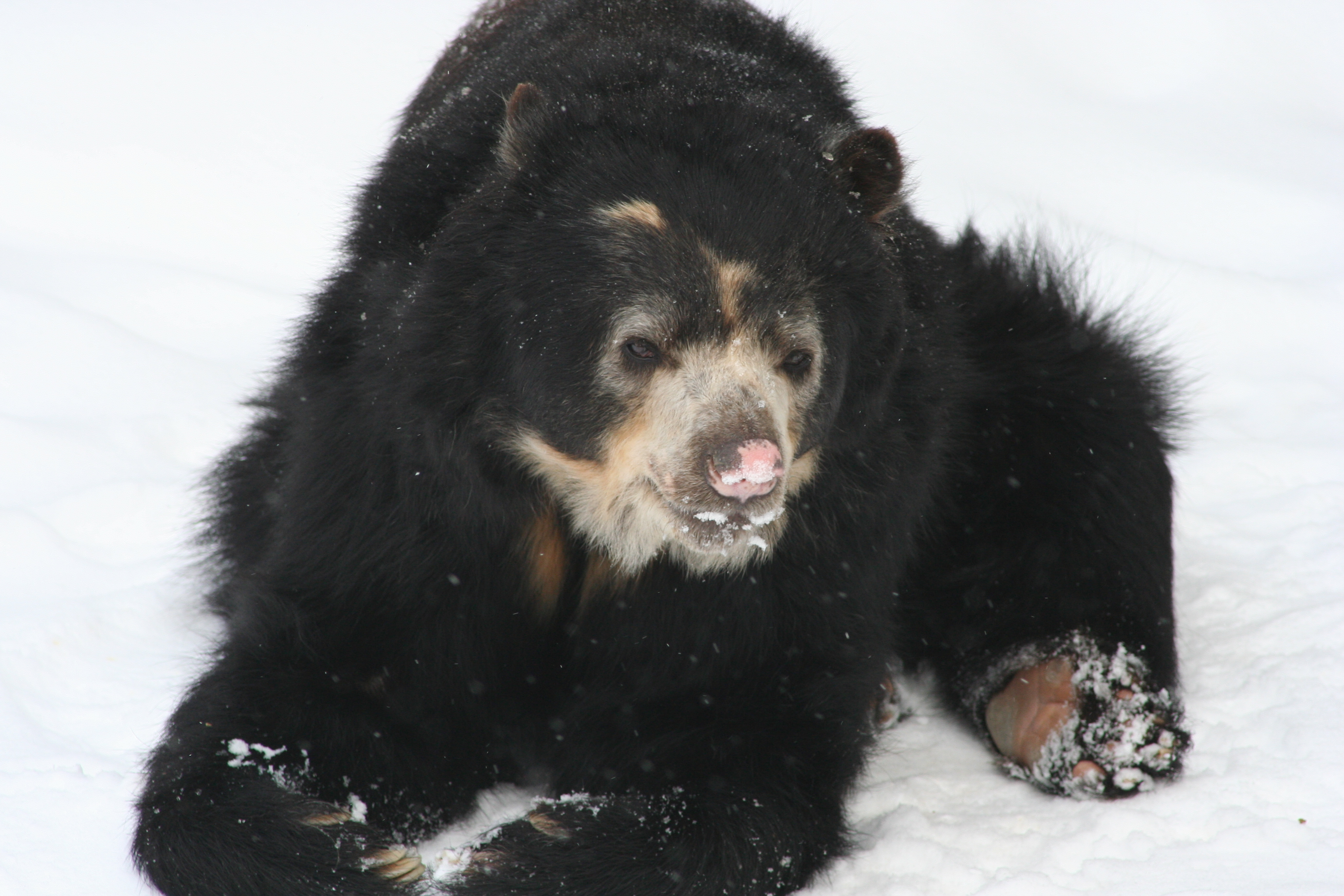
A spectacled bear at the Buffalo Zoo.

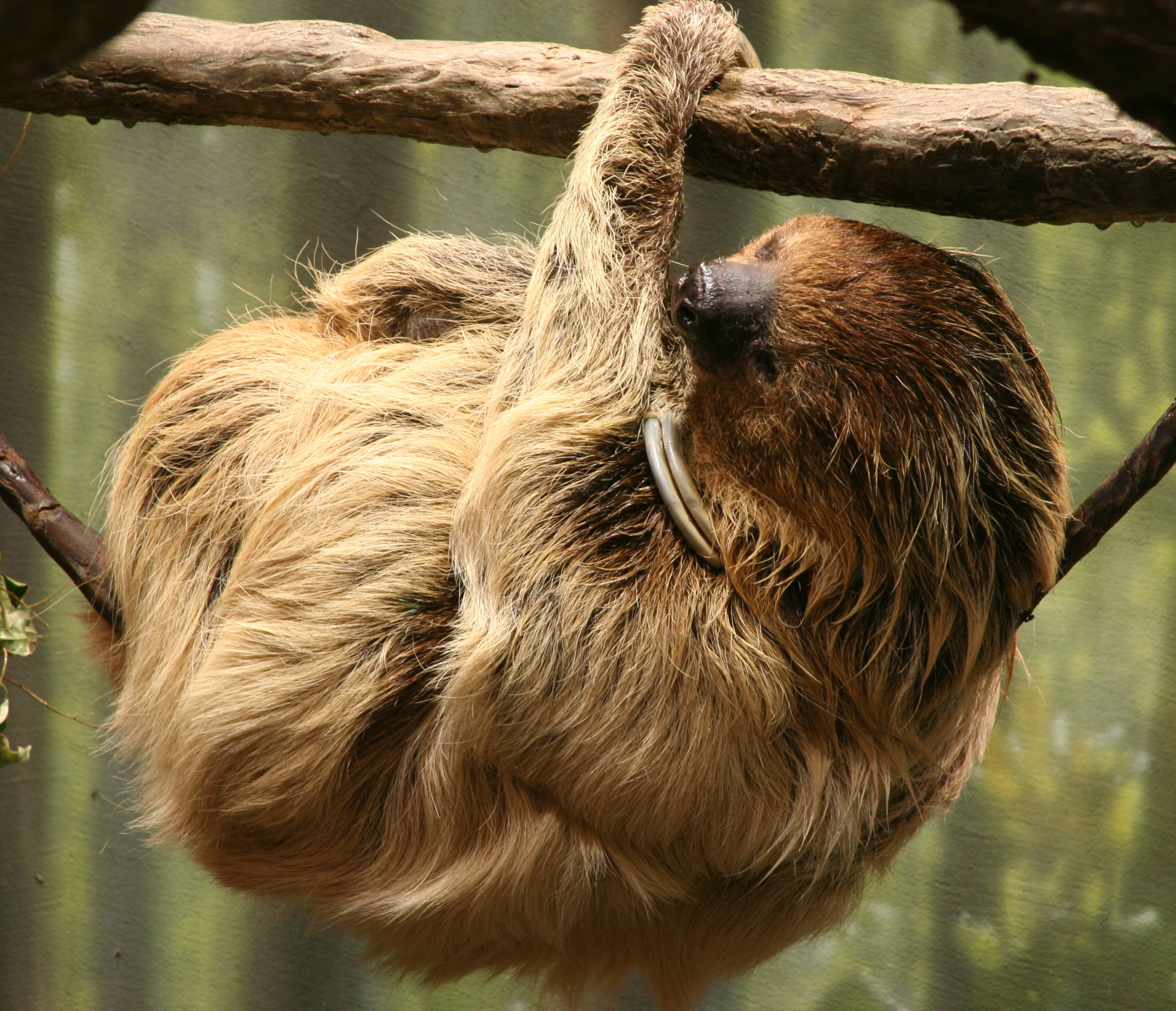
Two-toed sloth hanging from a tree at the Buffalo Zoo.

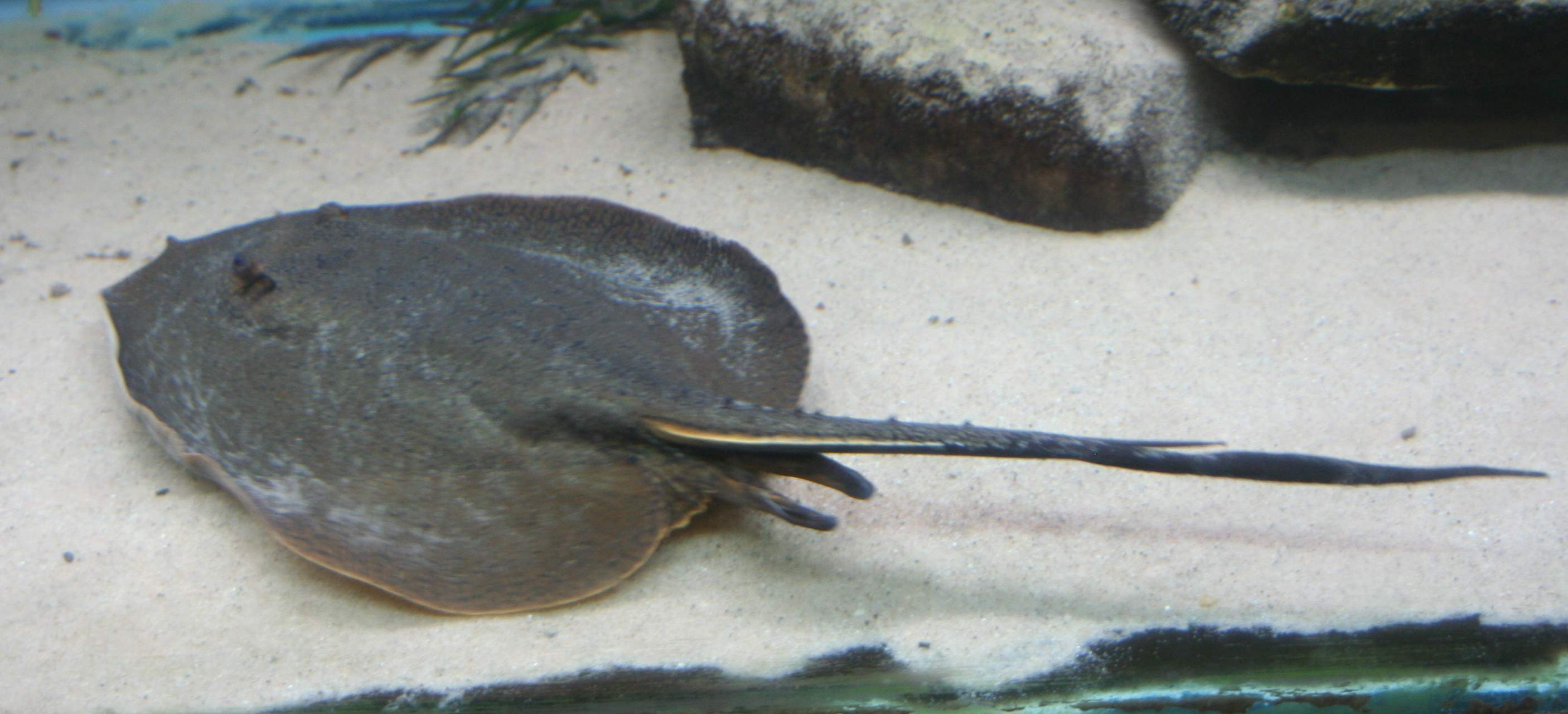
Long-tailed river stingray at the Buffalo Zoo.

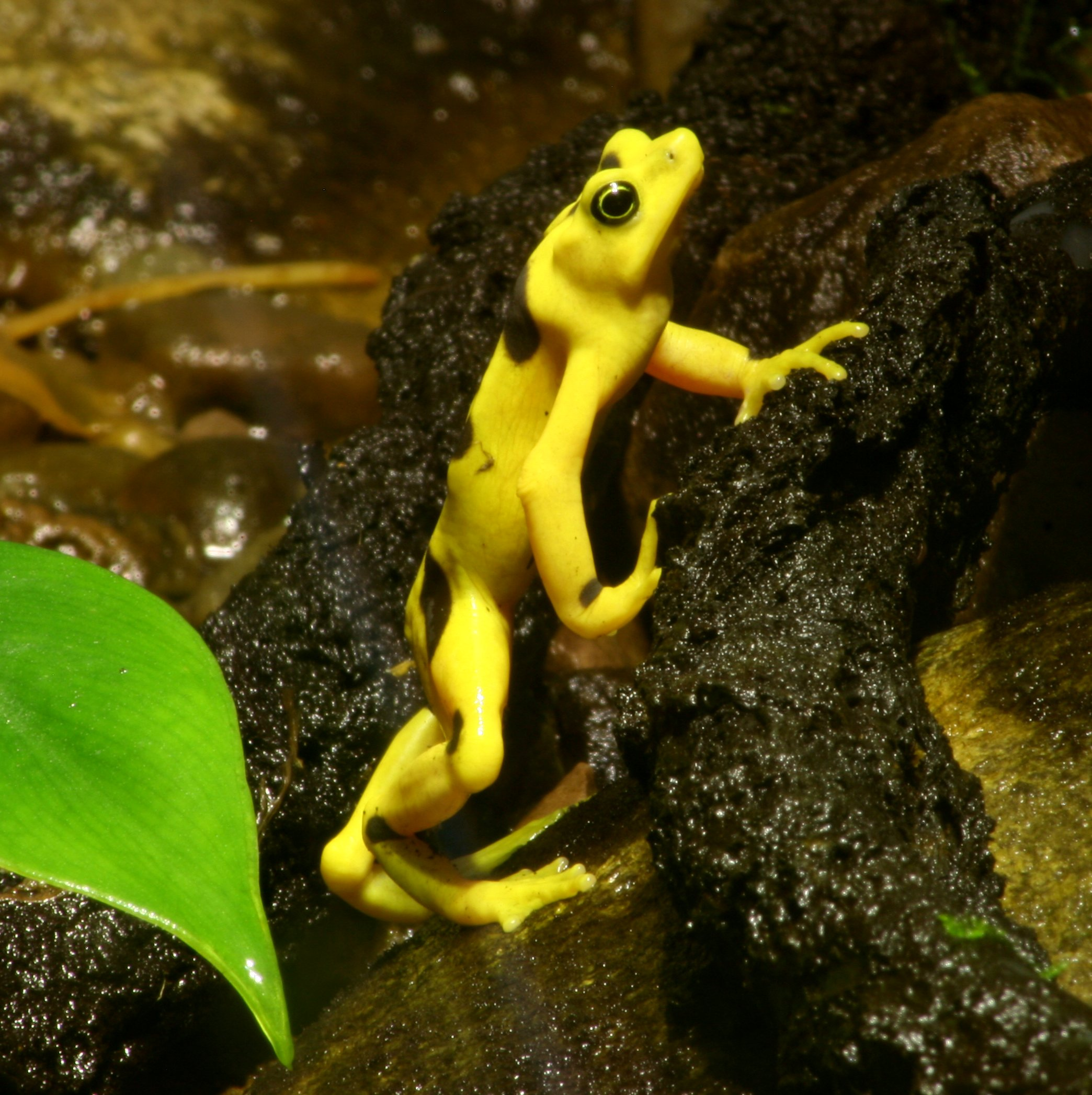
A Panamanian golden frog in its habitat at the Buffalo Zoo.

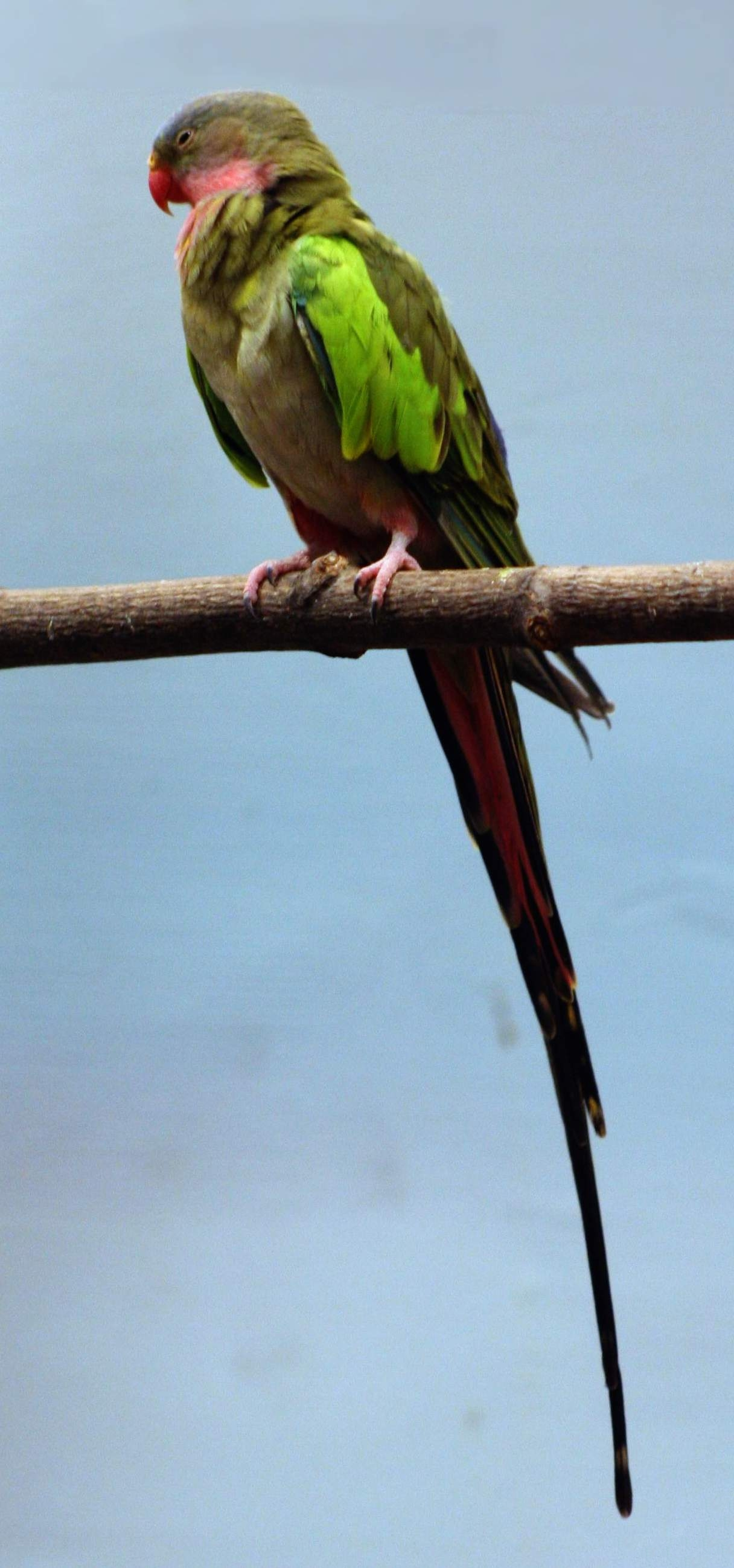
One of the Buffalo Zoo's princess parrots.

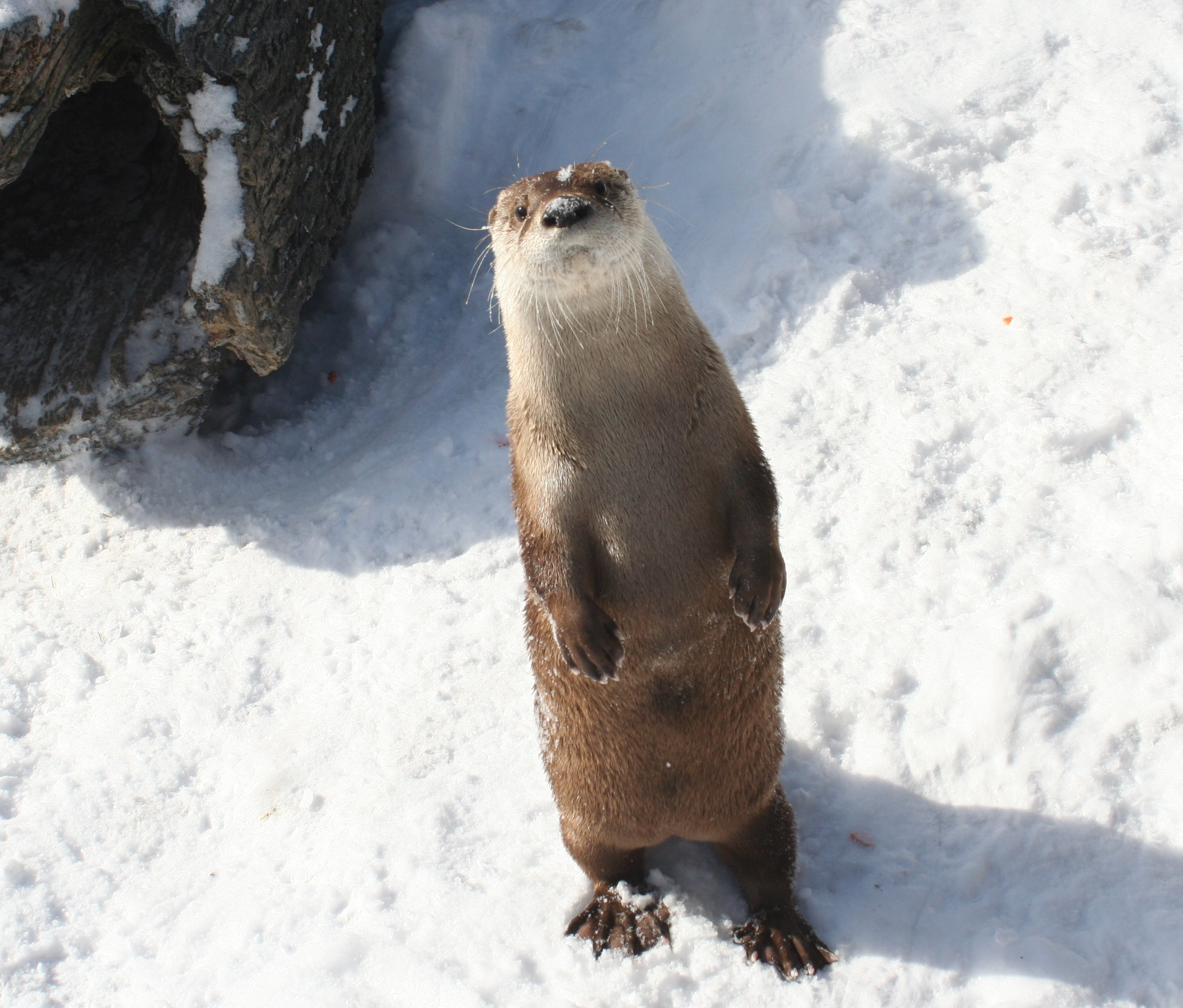
Northern river otter playing in the snow at the Buffalo Zoo.

One of the Buffalo Zoo's Indian rhinoceroses.

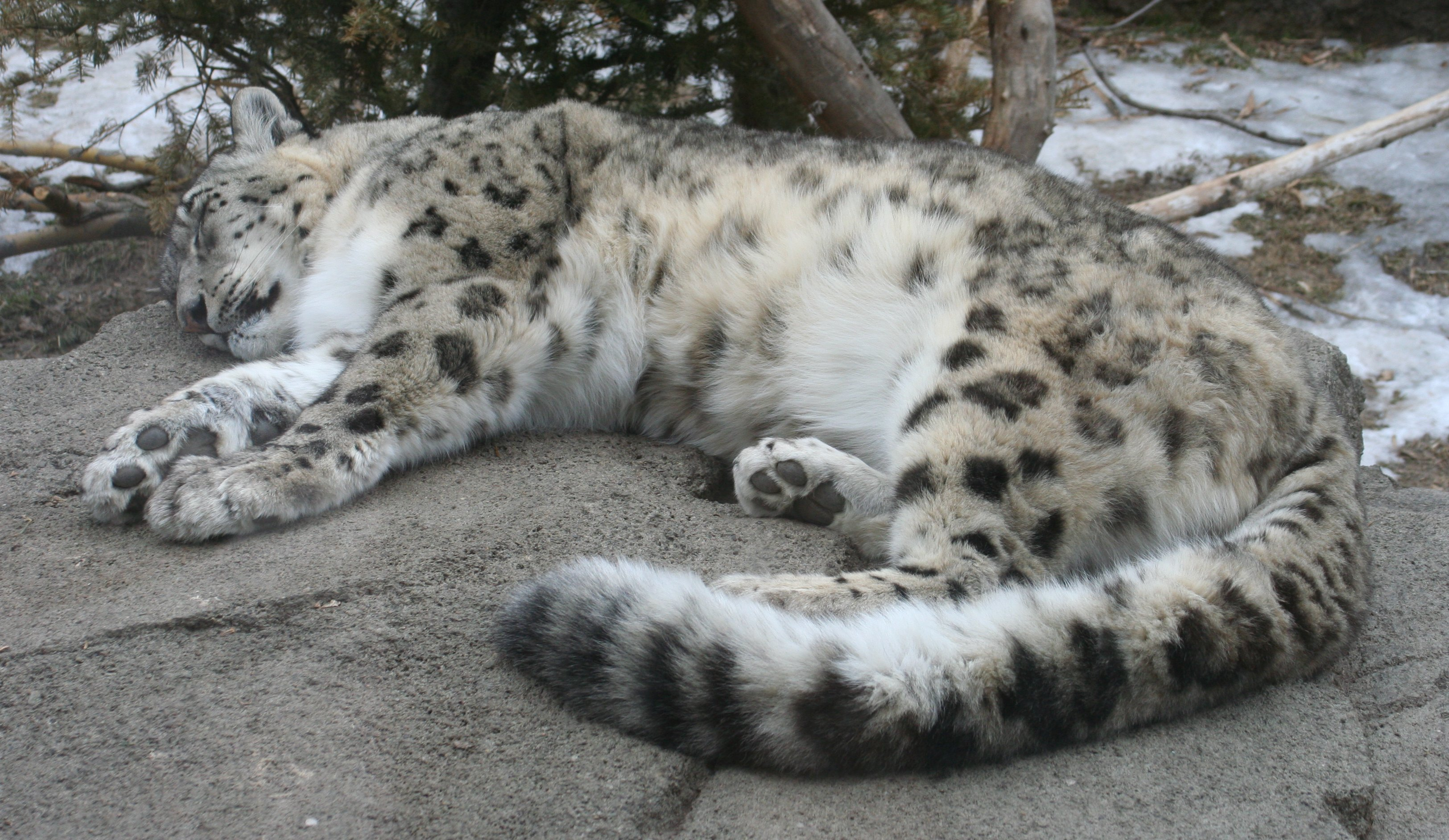
A sleeping snow leopard at the Buffalo Zoo.

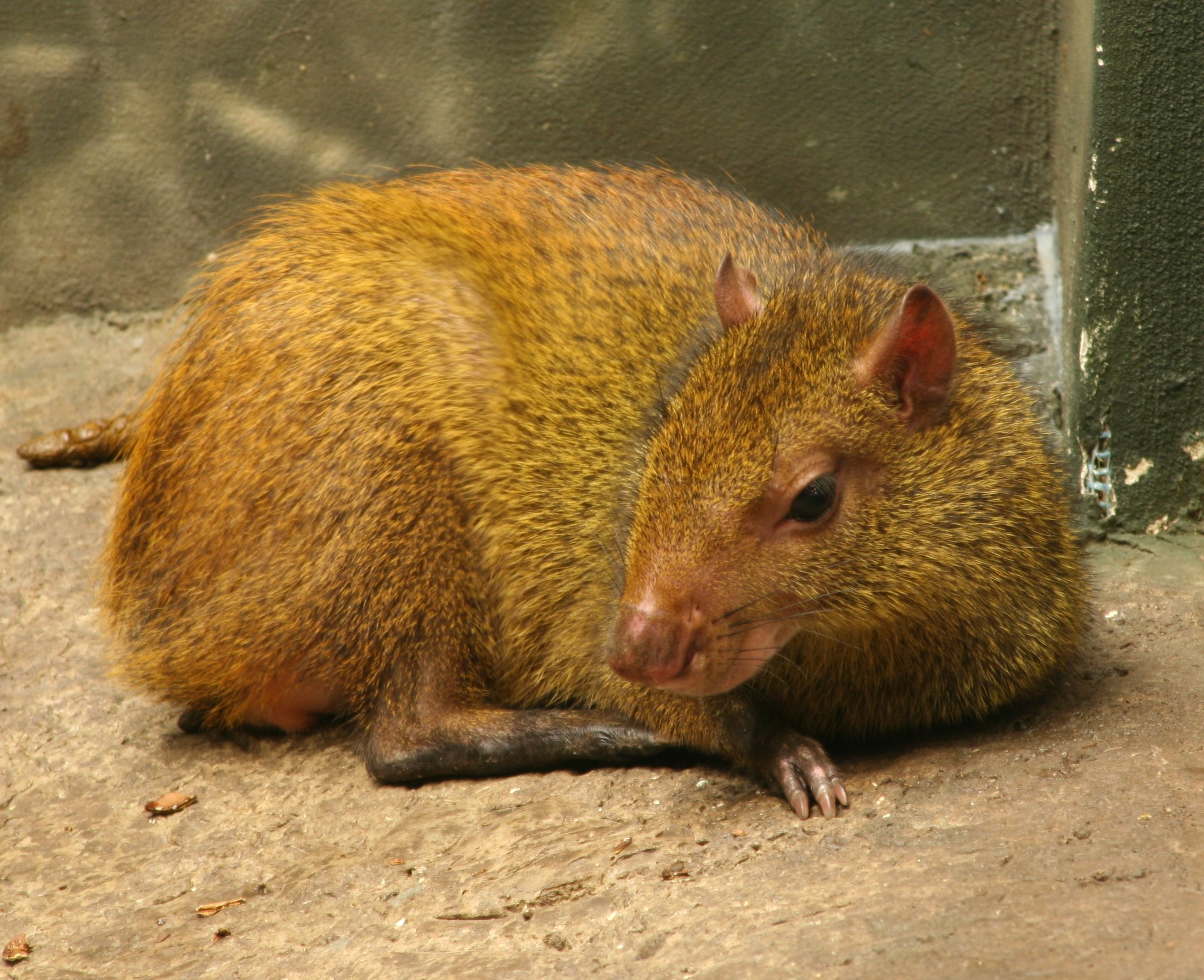
One of the Buffalo Zoo's Brazilian agoutis.

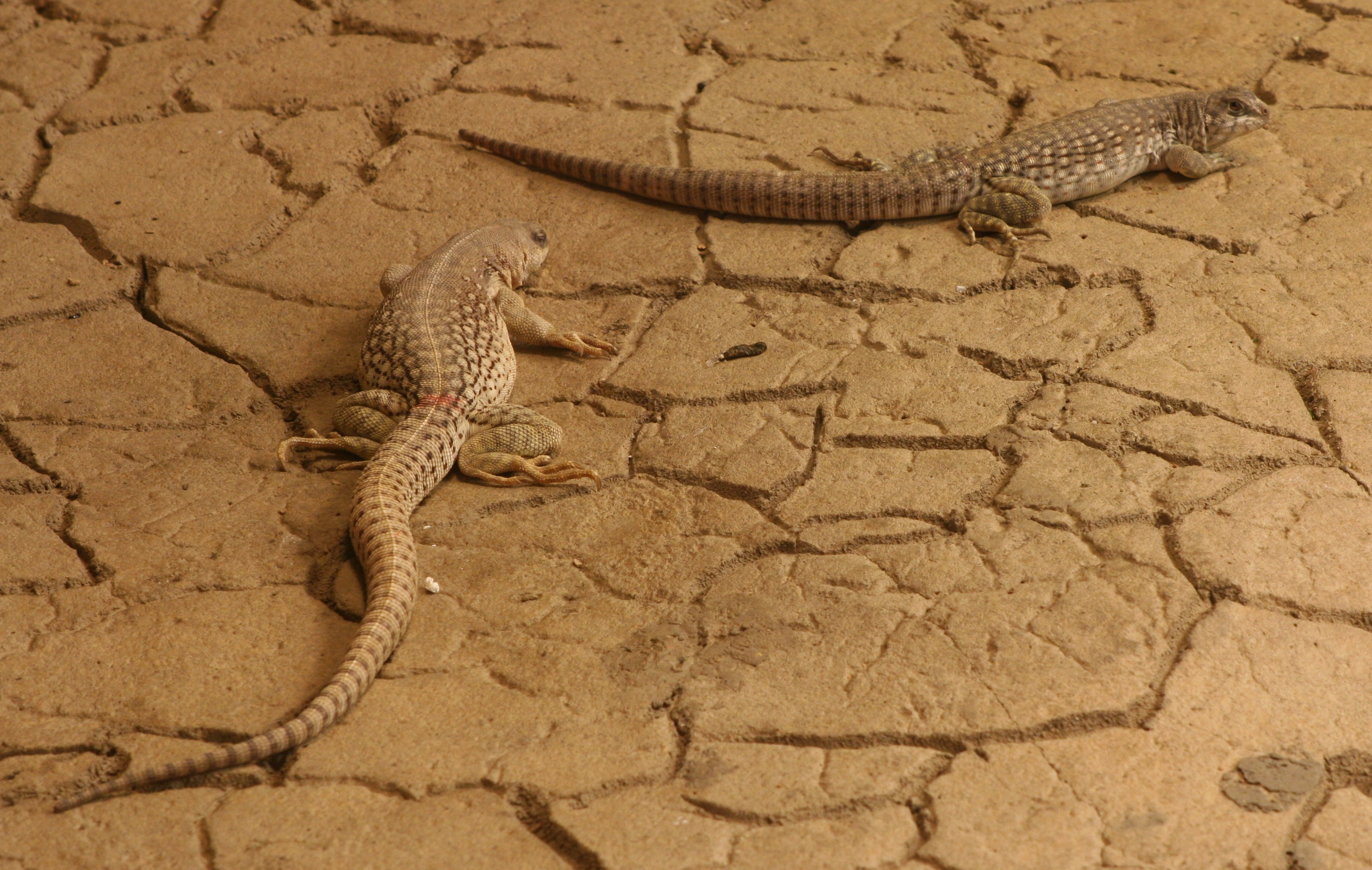
Desert iguanas in their habitat at the Buffalo Zoo.

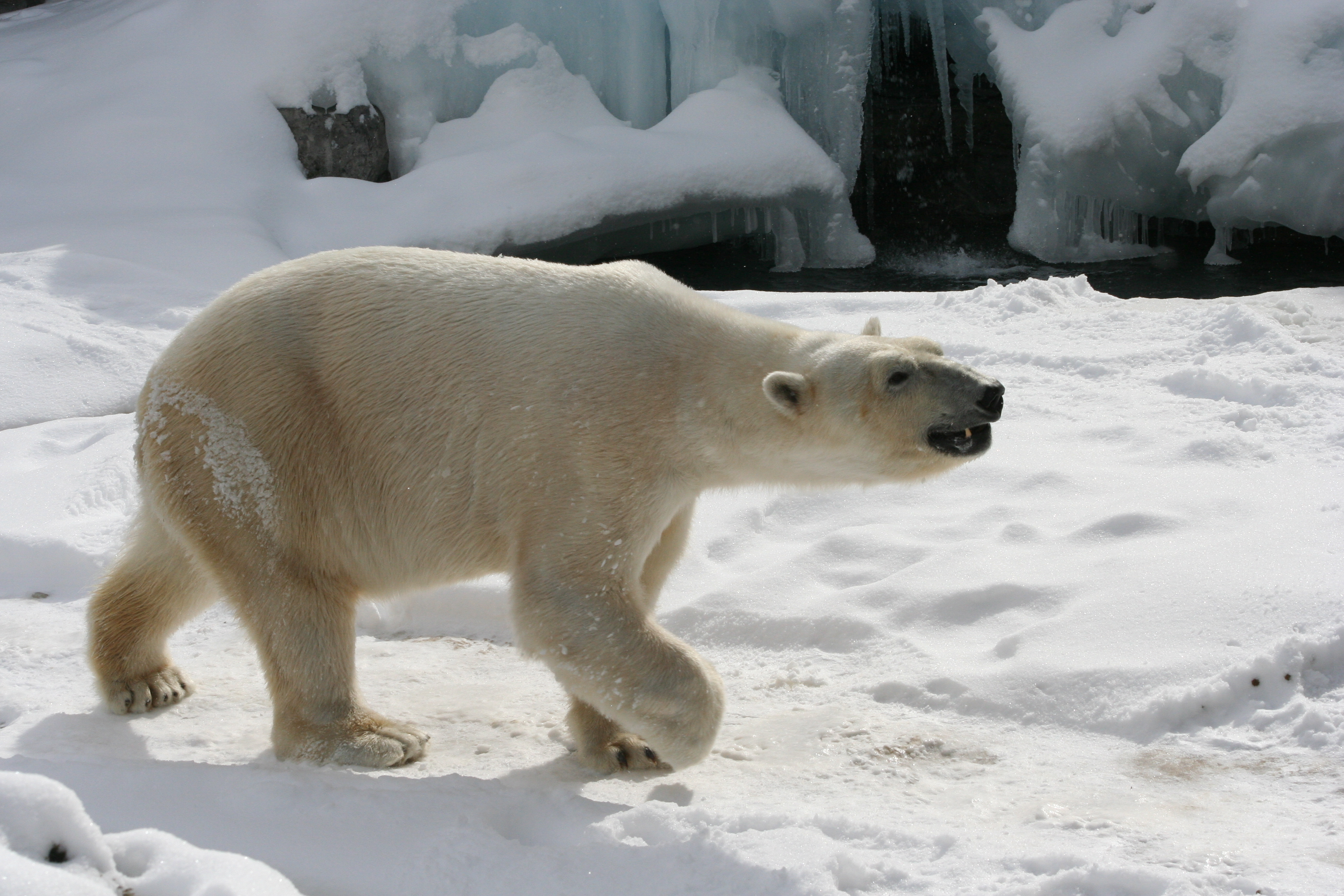
A polar bear roaming his habitat at the Buffalo Zoo.

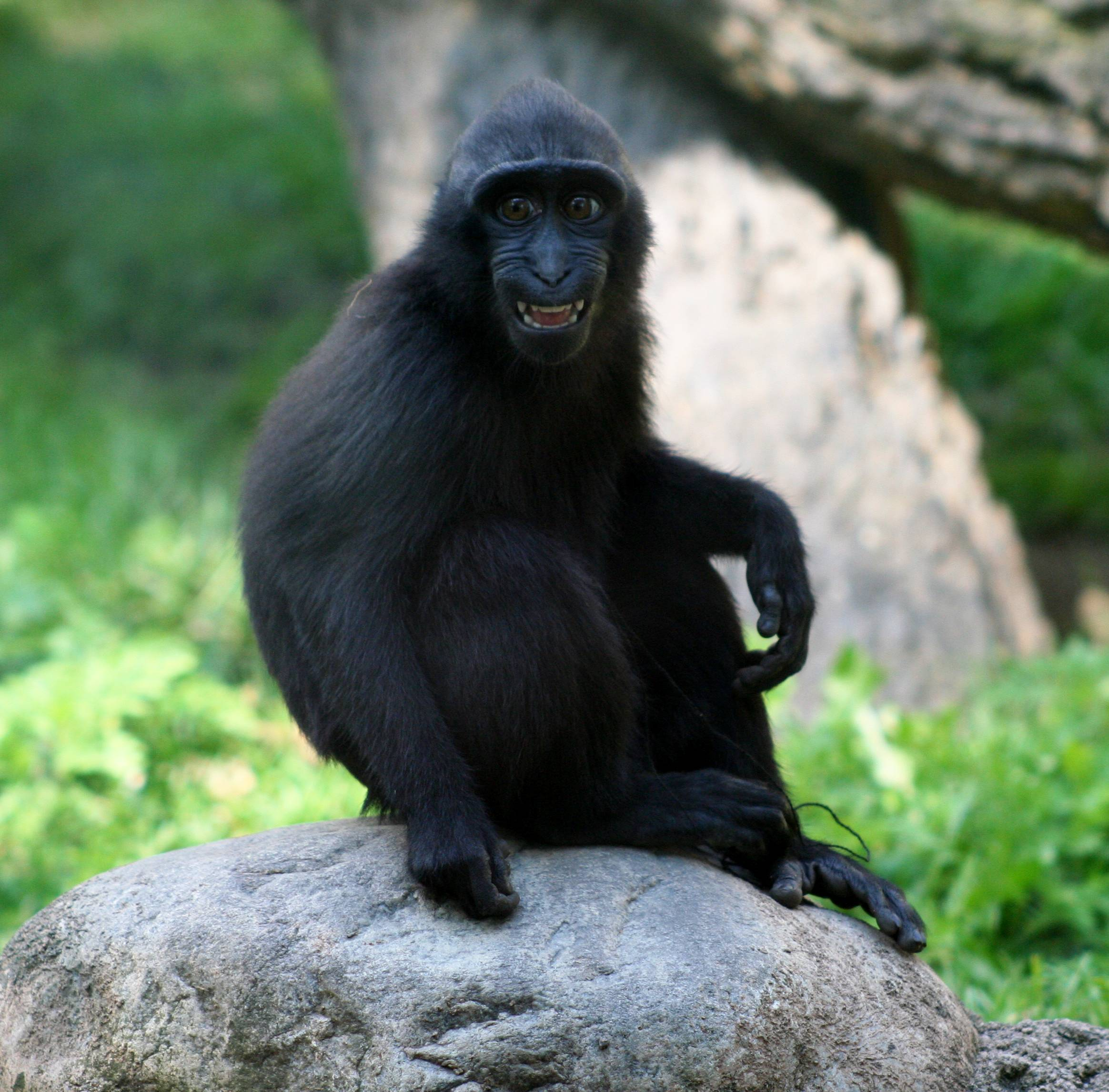
A juvenile Sulawesi crested macaque at the Buffalo Zoo.

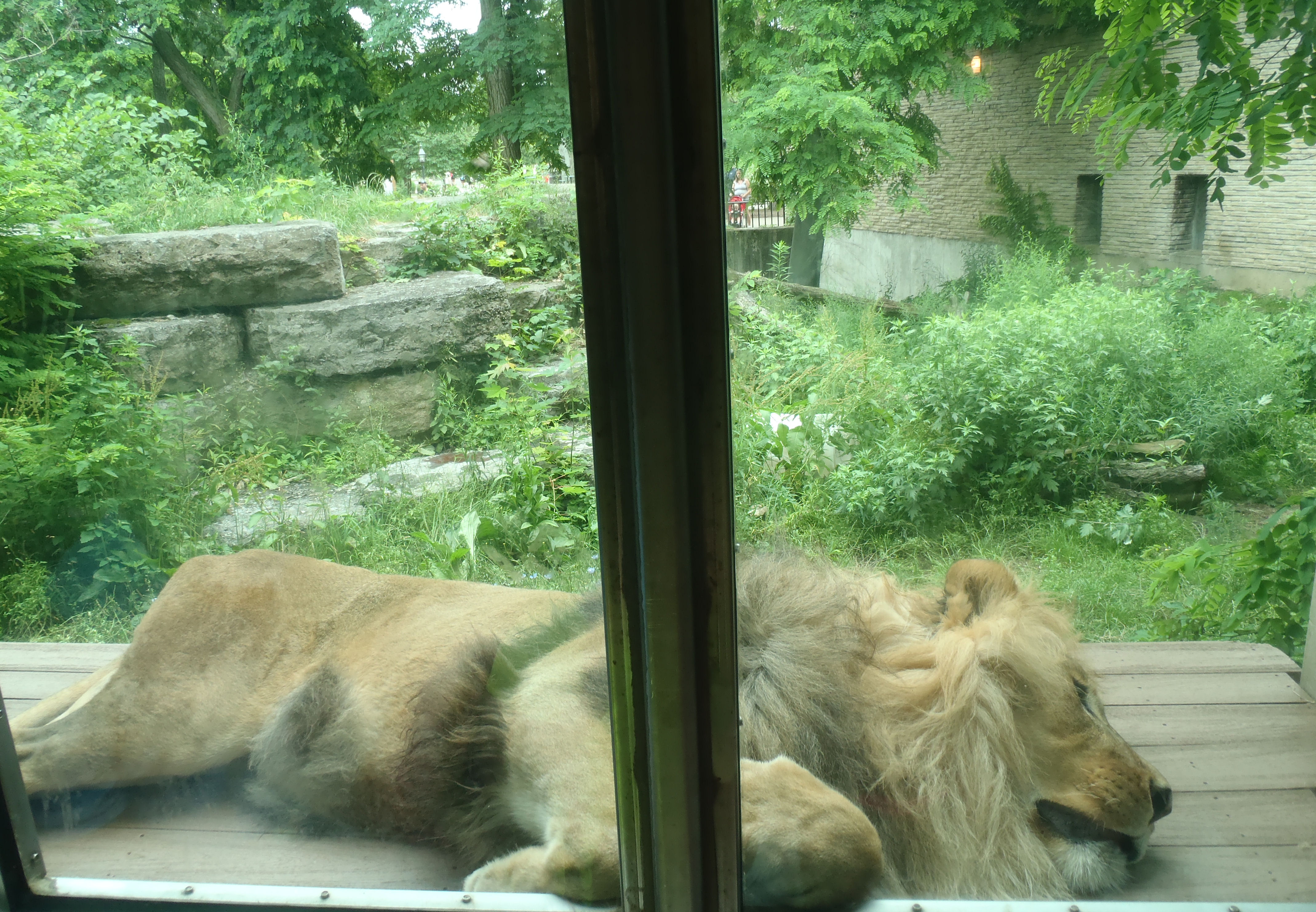
A lion sleeping against the protective glass at the Buffalo Zoo.
