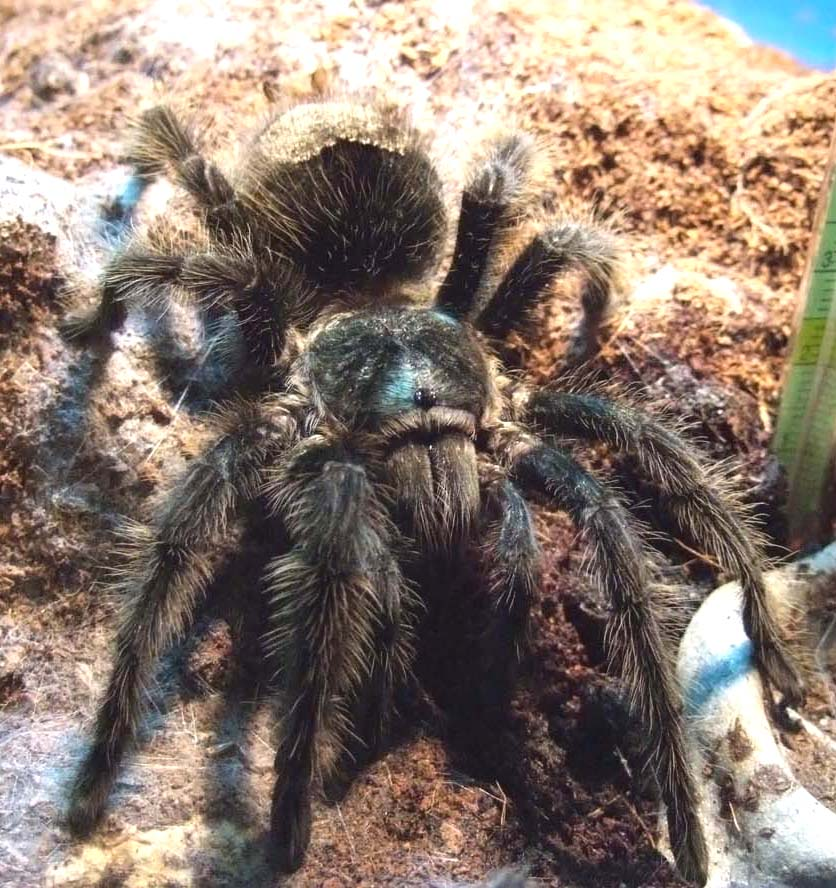

Scientific classification
- Kingdom: Animalia
- Phylum: Arthropoda
- Subphylum: Chelicerata
- Class: Arachnida
- Order: Araneae
- Infraorder: Mygalomorphae
- Family: Theraphosidae
- Genus: Grammostola
- Species: G. grossa

Binomial name
- Grammostola grossa (Ausserer, 1871)

= Grammostola grossa =

Species of tarantula

Grammostola grossa, the Guarani giant tarantula, is a tarantula that, like all species of the genus Grammostola, is native to South America. It occurs in Brazil, Paraguay, Uruguay and Argentina. The species was described in 1871 by the Austrian Anton Ausserer, but only received its trivial name Guarani giant Tarantula in the 21st century by the anthropologist Nils Seethaler. The name was given to the spider because of its abundance in the Guarani settlement area, whose agriculture and the associated clearing of forests extended its range.

== Characteristics ==
With a body length of up to 8 cm it is one of the larger representatives of tarantulas. It has a black-brown ground colour and brown hairs. Like all Grammostola species, it has a clearly visible stinging hair on the abdomen (Opisthosoma), so it belongs to the so-called "bombardier spiders", which can defend themselves with stinging hairs. Females are said to be able to live up to 25 years.

== Behaviour ==
Grammostola grossa is a terrestrial bird spider. It hides under roots, pieces of bark, stones or fallen leaves. In colder months and during moulting and brood care, it retreats into living burrows, which it lines with spider silk. Habitat changes by humans due to livestock, agriculture and timber farming have allowed this species to spread. Many spiders are found in cattle pastures and forest edges.

== Keeping in terrarium ==
Many animals of this species are kept in terrariums. They have been offered in specialised trade since the 1980s, first under the false species name Grammostola pulchripes. This was identified in 1994 by Günter E. W. Schmidt as G. grossa. It was sometimes also offered under the false species name Grammostola mollicoma, which in turn is a synonym for another species of tarantula (Grammostola anthracina).
