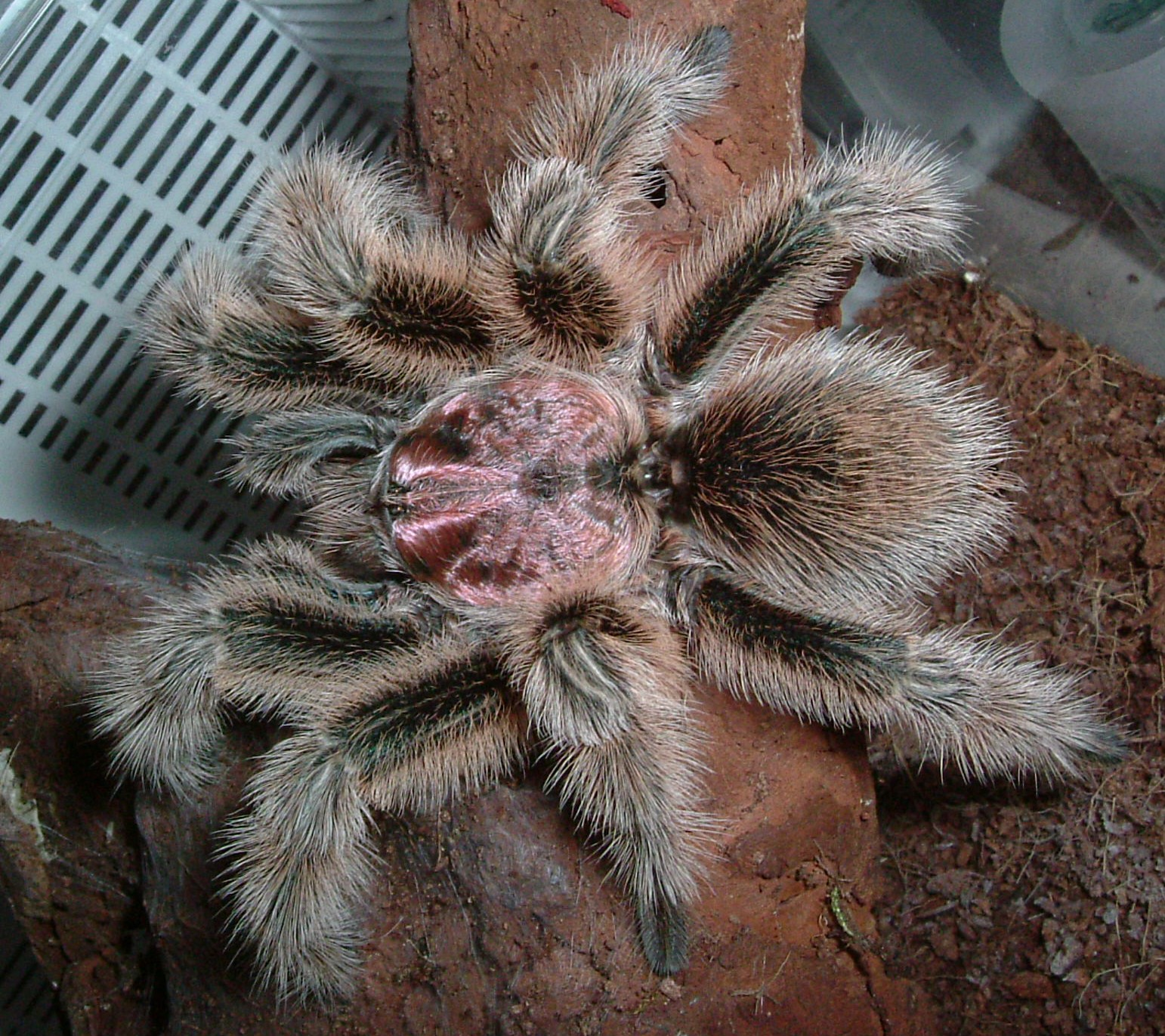
- Male Grammostola rosea

Scientific classification
- Kingdom: Animalia
- Phylum: Arthropoda
- Subphylum: Chelicerata
- Class: Arachnida
- Order: Araneae
- Infraorder: Mygalomorphae
- Family: Theraphosidae
- Genus: Grammostola; Simon, 1892

Type species
- G. pulchripes (Simon, 1891)

Species
- 20, see text

Synonyms
- Lasiocnemus Ausserer, 1871; Lasiopelma Simon, 1892; Polyspina Schmidt, 1994; Polyspinosa Schmidt, 1999; Sorata Strand, 1907

= Grammostola =

Genus of spiders

Grammostola is a genus of South American tarantulas that was first described in text by Eugène Louis Simon in 1892. These medium- to large-sized spiders are native to tropical South America, and are usually brown in color, with pinkish or orangish-red hairs. The very docile Chilean rose tarantula (Grammostola rosea) is popular as a beginner's spider among tarantula enthusiasts.

== Grammostola as a pet ==
The Chilean rose tarantula (Grammostola rosea) is a common pet, as its behavior is generally docile and its venom is very mild. It needs to be kept dry and dislikes being wet (its natural habitat is one of the driest deserts on earth). If the substrate is too wet, it will stand "on tiptoes" in discomfort, or climb the sides of its enclosure, risking fall and injury. It feeds on other invertebrates. Its attributes and care are similar to those of its relative, the Chaco golden-knee tarantula (Grammostola pulchripes).

== Species ==
As of January 2024 it contains twenty species, found in South America:

- Grammostola actaeon (Pocock, 1903) – Brazil, Uruguay
- Grammostola alticeps (Pocock, 1903) – Uruguay
- Grammostola andreleetzi Vol, 2008 – Uruguay
- Grammostola anthracina (C. L. Koch, 1842) – Brazil, Uruguay, Paraguay, Argentina
- Grammostola borelli (Simon, 1897) – Paraguay
- Grammostola burzaquensis Ibarra, 1946 – Argentina
- Grammostola chalcothrix Chamberlin, 1917 – Argentina
- Grammostola diminuta Ferretti, Pompozzi, González & Pérez-Miles, 2013 – Argentina
- Grammostola doeringi (Holmberg, 1881) – Argentina
- Grammostola gossei (Pocock, 1899) – Argentina
- Grammostola grossa (Ausserer, 1871) – Brazil, Paraguay, Uruguay, Argentina
- Grammostola iheringi (Keyserling, 1891) – Brazil
- Grammostola inermis Mello-Leitão, 1941 – Argentina
- Grammostola mendozae (Strand, 1907) – Argentina
- Grammostola pulchra Mello-Leitão, 1921 – Brazil
- Grammostola pulchripes (Simon, 1891) (type) – Paraguay, Argentina
- Grammostola quirogai Montes de Oca, D'Elía & Pérez-Miles, 2016 – Brazil, Uruguay
- Grammostola rosea (Walckenaer, 1837) – Bolivia, Chile, Argentina
- Grammostola subvulpina (Strand, 1906) – South America
- Grammostola vachoni Schiapelli & Gerschman, 1961 – Argentina

=== In synonymy ===
- G. argentinensis Strand, 1907 = Grammostola rosea (Walckenaer, 1837)
- G. aureostriata Schmidt & Bullmer, 2001 = Grammostola pulchripes (Simon, 1891)
- G. australis Gerschman & Schiapelli, 1948 = Grammostola inermis Mello-Leitão, 1941
- G. brevimetatarsis Strand, 1907 = Grammostola actaeon (Pocock, 1903)
- G. cala Chamberlin, 1917 = Grammostola rosea (Walckenaer, 1837)
- G. fasciata Mello-Leitão, 1921 = Grammostola grossa (Ausserer, 1871)
- G. ferruginea Mello-Leitão, 1921 = Grammostola grossa (Ausserer, 1871)
- G. fossor Schmidt, 2001 = Grammostola vachoni Schiapelli & Gerschman, 1961
- G. gigantea Mello-Leitão, 1921 = Grammostola iheringi (Keyserling, 1891)
- G. grandicola Strand, 1908 = Grammostola grossa (Ausserer, 1871)
- G. longimana Mello-Leitão, 1921 = Grammostola anthracina (C. L. Koch, 1842)
- G. mollicoma (Ausserer, 1875) = Grammostola anthracina (C. L. Koch, 1842)
- G. porteri (Mello-Leitão, 1936) = Grammostola rosea (Walckenaer, 1837)
- G. roquettei Mello-Leitão, 1921 = Grammostola anthracina (C. L. Koch, 1842)
- G. schulzei (Schmidt, 1994) = Grammostola vachoni Schiapelli & Gerschman, 1961
- G. spatulata (F. O. Pickard-Cambridge, 1897) = Grammostola rosea (Walckenaer, 1837)

==== Transferred to other genera ====
Grammostola familiaris (Bertkau, 1880) → Homoeomma familiare

==== Nomen dubium ====
Grammostola monticola (Strand, 1907) - Bolivia

== Gallery ==
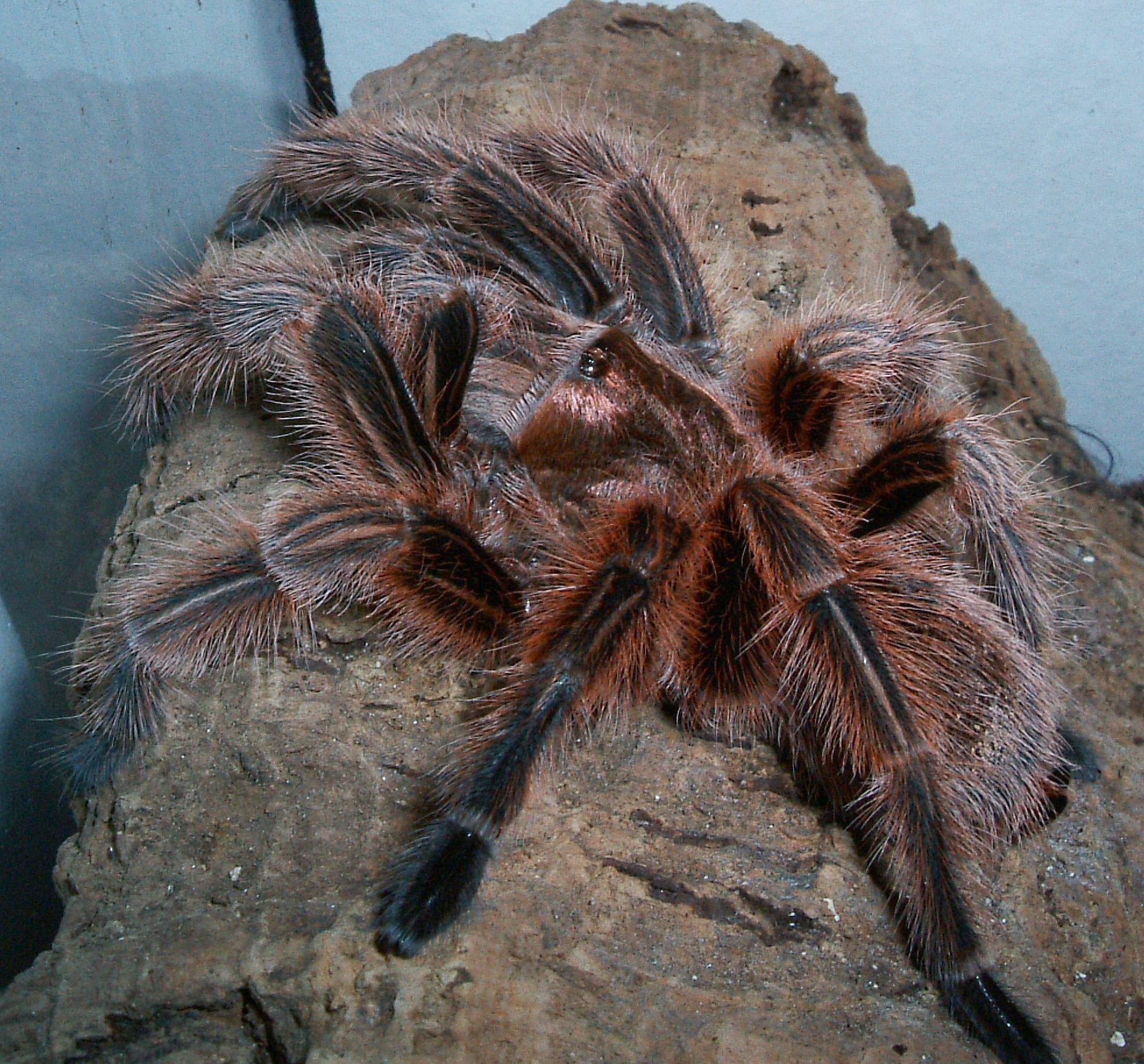
Grammostola rosea

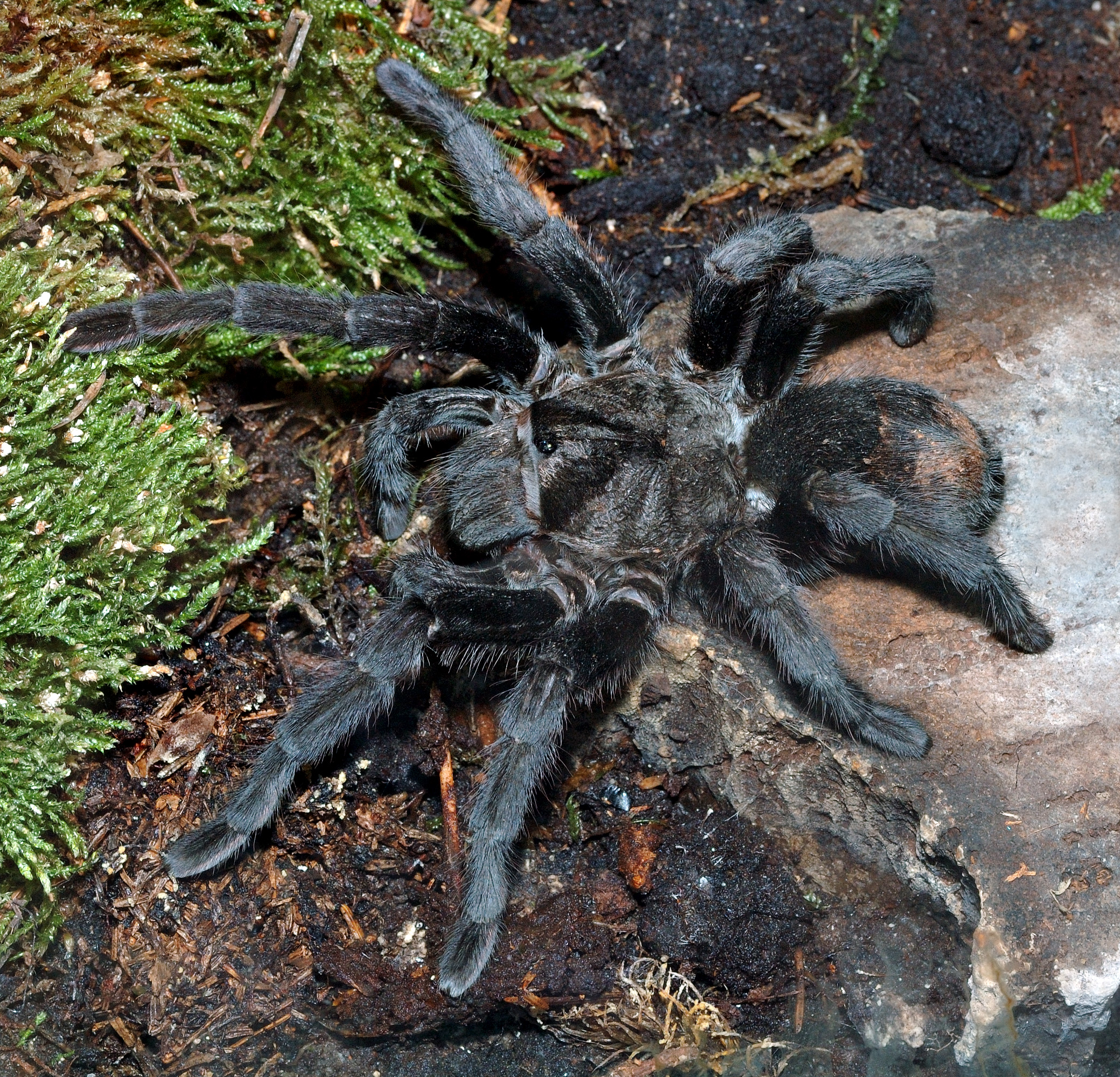
Grammostola pulchra

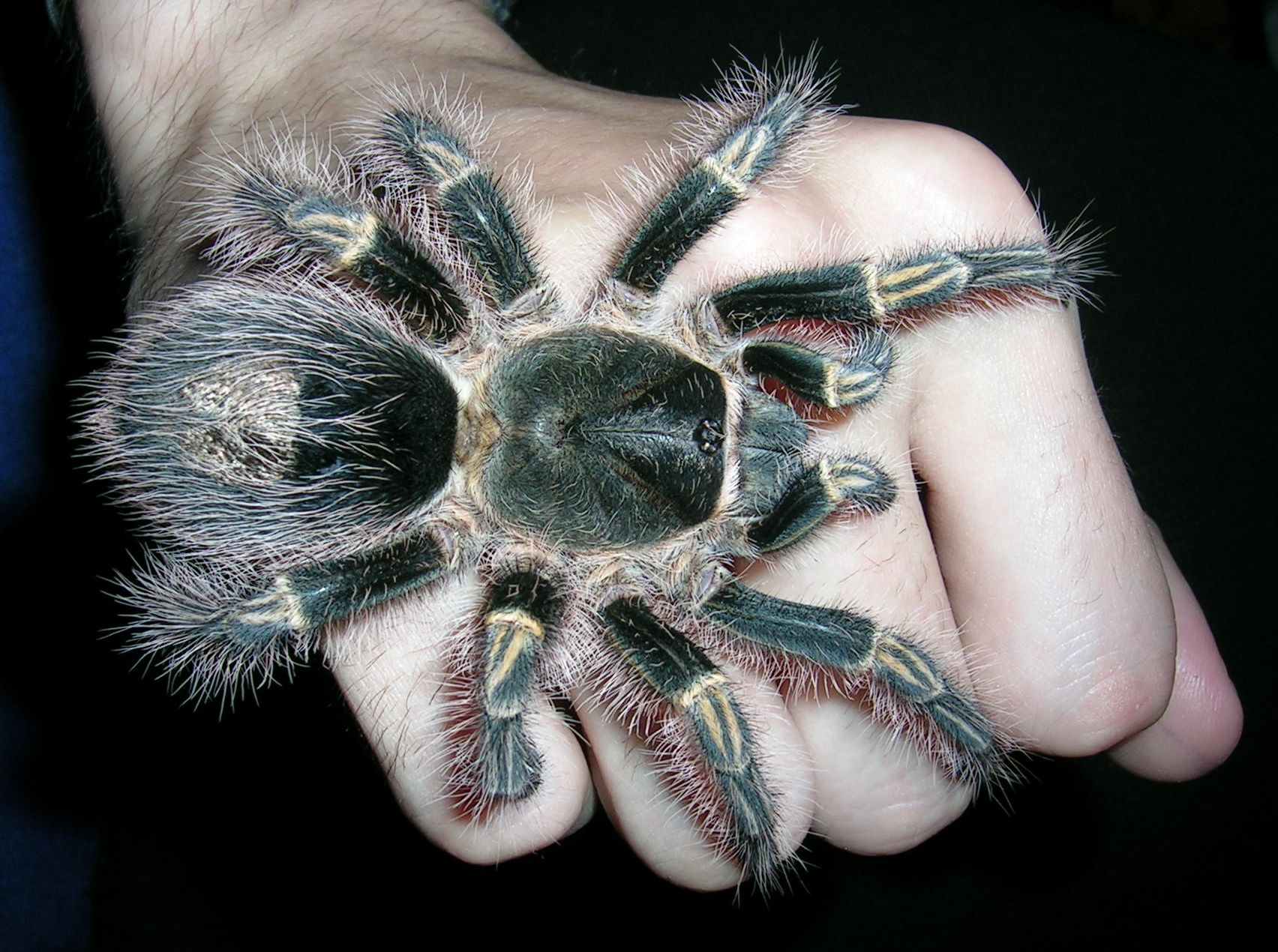
Grammostola pulchripes (aureostriata)
