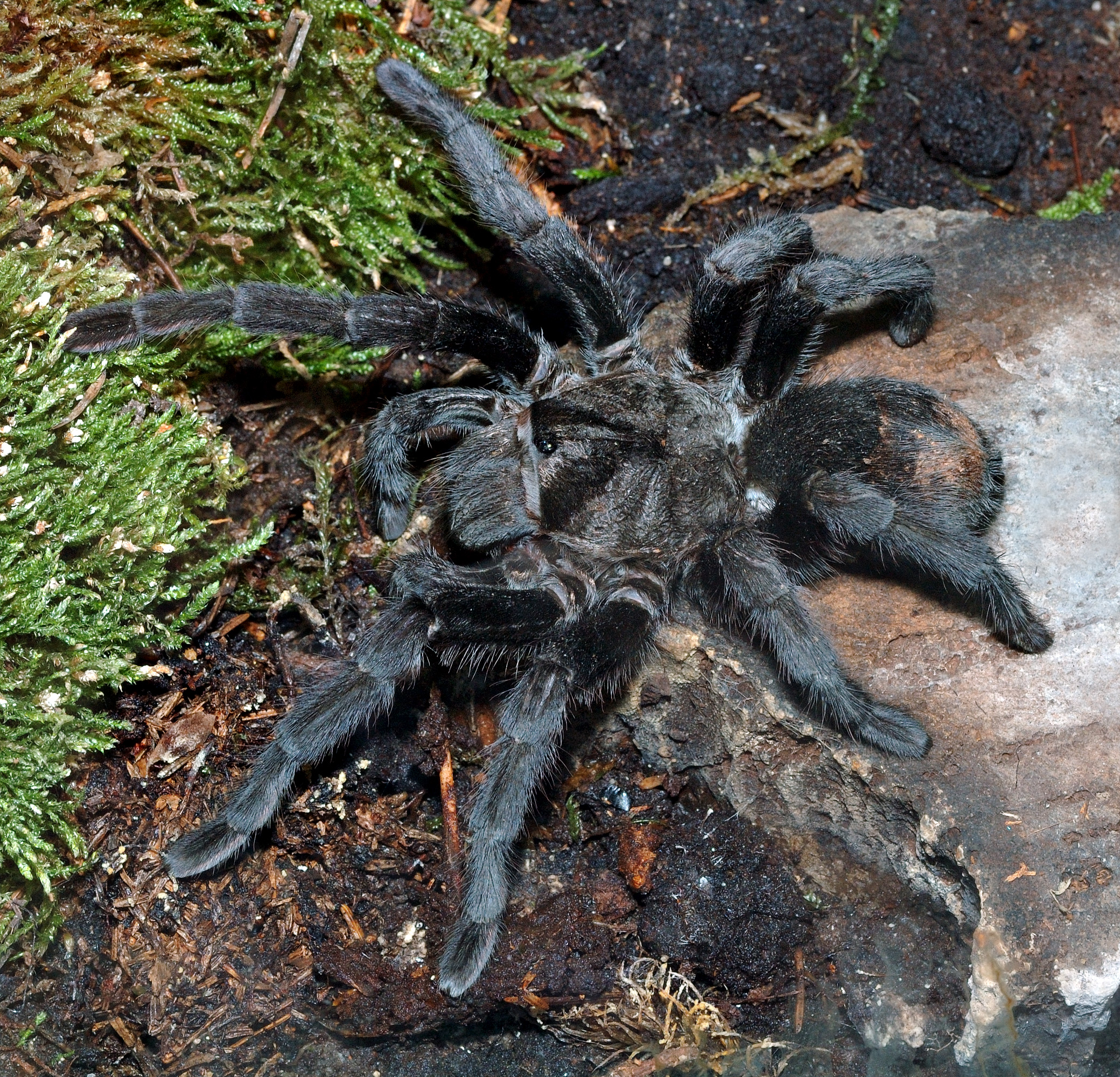

Scientific classification
- Kingdom: Animalia
- Phylum: Arthropoda
- Subphylum: Chelicerata
- Class: Arachnida
- Order: Araneae
- Infraorder: Mygalomorphae
- Family: Theraphosidae
- Genus: Grammostola
- Species: G. pulchra

Binomial name
- Grammostola pulchra Mello-Leitão, 1921

= Grammostola pulchra =

Brazilian black tarantula

Species of spider

Grammostola pulchra is a species of tarantula (family Theraphosidae), native to Brazil. It is known for its solid black body, which makes it an appealing tarantula for the pet trade.

== Description ==
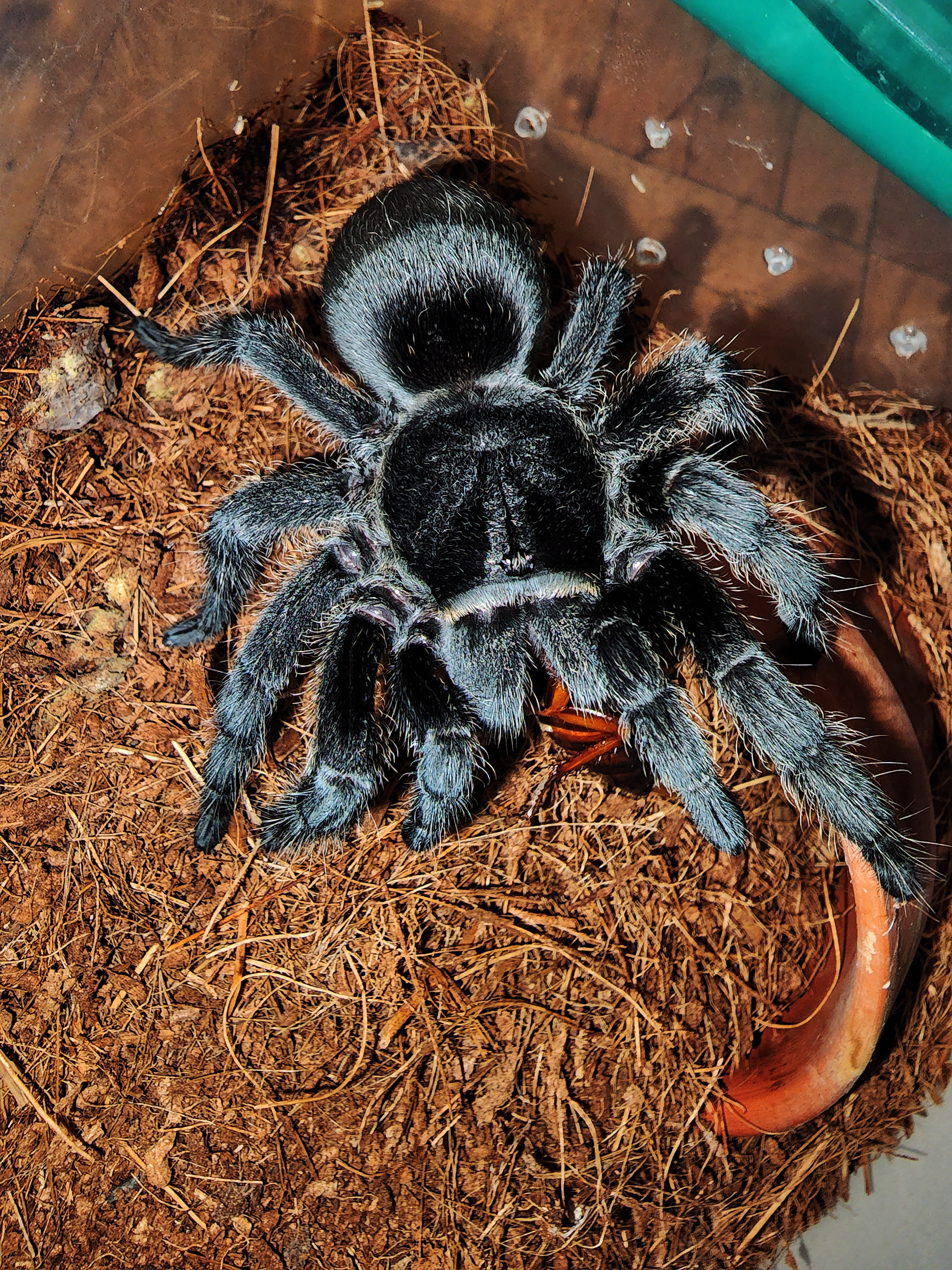
Eating a conserved insect

Commonly known as the Brazilian black, mature specimens are almost entirely black. Although like most new world tarantulas it possesses urticating hairs, if provoked, they would much rather flee than attack. Their venom is not as irritating as many other species of tarantulas. The Brazilian black is a slow grower, taking up to eight years to reach maturity, reaching up to 18 cm (7 in). As with all tarantulas, females of this species will almost always outlive males by many years. As a juvenile in captivity, this species tends to burrow when given the opportunity. They thrive on mealworms, crickets, roaches, and other small insects.

== Pet trade ==
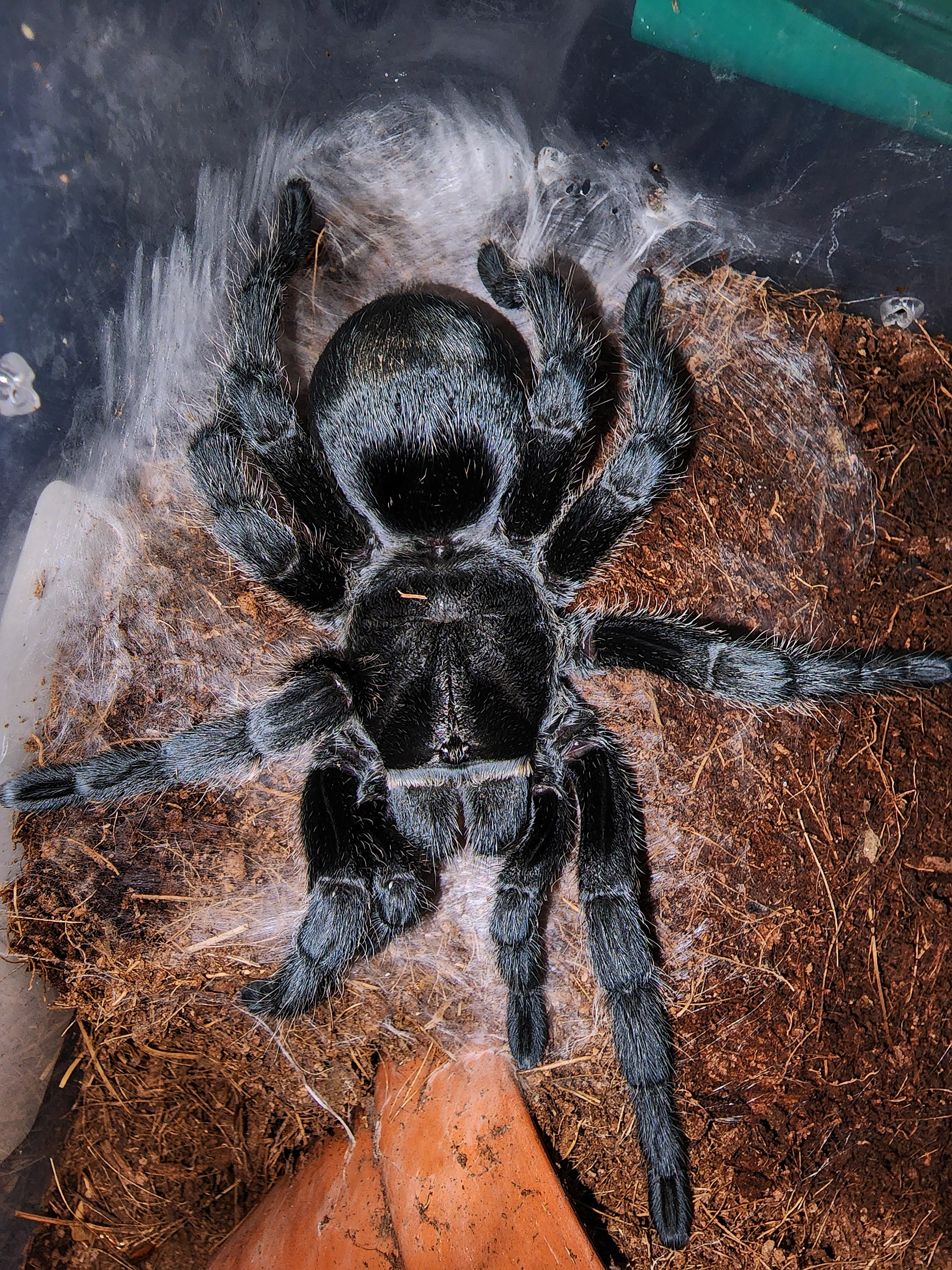
young female G pulchra in captivity

The species is desirable in the pet trade because of the females' long lifespan and reputation for being docile and gentle in temperament, as well as for its appealing dark coloration. These traits make them rather expensive when buying from a breeder. It is said to have a reduced tendency to kick urticating hairs off when handled, which adds to its desirability as a pet. Many times, they do not spread urticating hairs around their homes, as observed in other tarantula species. Because of a ban on the export of wild caught specimens and its slow growth, mature females (preferred because of their long life) are generally expensive. Many "Brazilian" black tarantulas sold as pets are actually Grammostola quirogai (Uruguayan black tarantulas), another species in the same genus with a nearly identical appearance, which was first identified as a distinct species in 2015.

== Photos ==
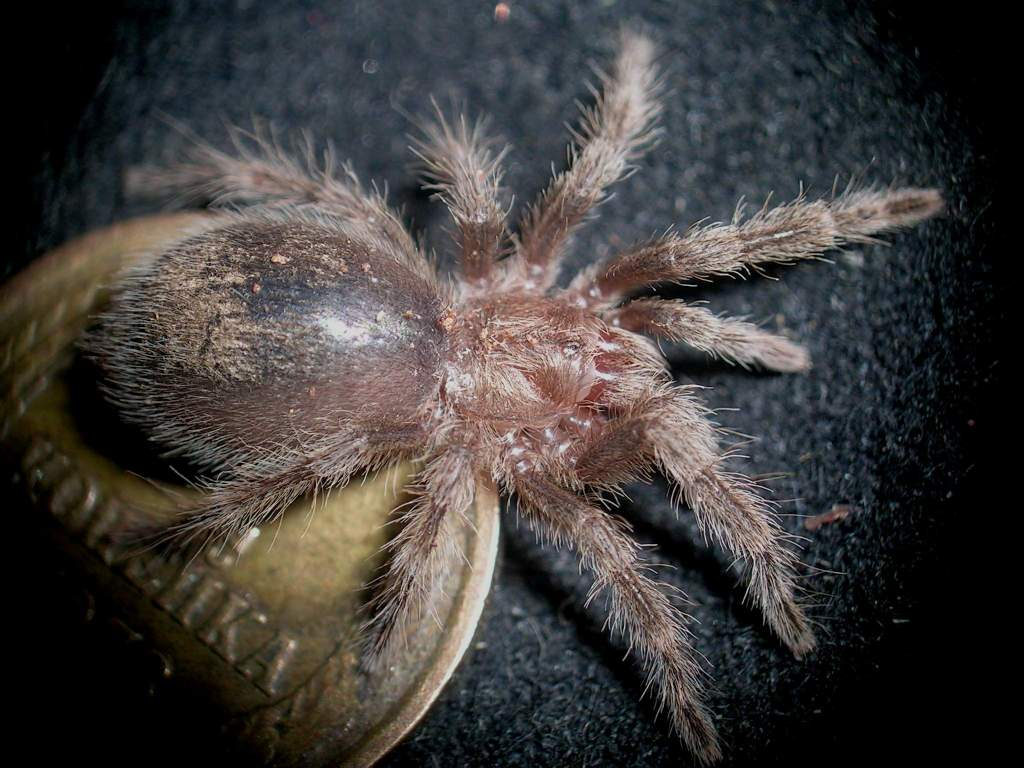
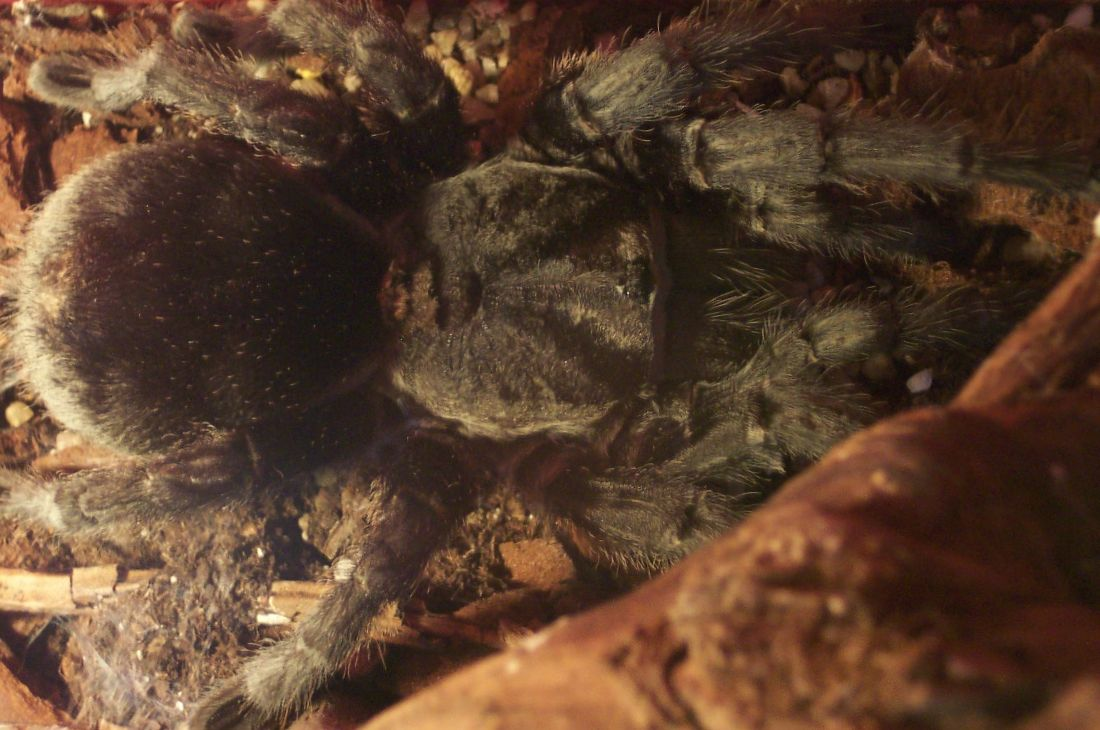
