= Donna M. Fernandes =

American zoo administrator

Doctor Donna M. Fernandes
- Education: Phillips Academy Brown University (B.S.) Princeton University (Ph.D.) Simmons School of Management
- Occupation: 2000 - 2017: President/CEO Buffalo Zoo
- Website: https://www.buffalozoo.org/

Dr. Donna M. Fernandes is an American zoo administrator who is a past President and CEO of the Buffalo Zoo (2000 to 2017). Under her administration, the zoo advanced in terms of exhibits, visitor attractions and attendance.

Fernandes is a native of Norton, Massachusetts and a graduate of Phillips Academy in Andover, Massachusetts. After graduation, she attended Brown University, receiving a Bachelor of Science degree in psychology in 1981. She then attended Princeton University, where she received a master's degree in biology in 1984 and a Ph.D. in biology in 1988 after completing a doctoral dissertation, titled "The adaptive significance of protandry in the terrestrial slug, Arion subfuscus", under the supervision of Dan Rubenstein. Fernandes spent a year in postdoctoral study at the University of Liverpool in England.

Fernandes's first position was as the Curator of Research at the Franklin Park Zoo in Boston. She was later promoted to oversee education and volunteer programs there. In 1996 she accepted a position as the Curator of Animals at the Prospect Park Zoo in Brooklyn, New York. Within a year she was overseeing both the animal and education departments. During that time, Fernandes served as the National Public Radio resident animal expert. In 2000, Fernandes received a master's degree in business administration from the Simmons School of Management at Simmons University in Boston.

Also in 2000, Fernandes accepted the job at the Buffalo Zoo as President and CEO. She continued in this role until 2017 when she announced her retirement.
