= Grammostola actaeon =

Scientific classification
- Kingdom: Animalia
- Phylum: Arthropoda
- Subphylum: Chelicerata
- Class: Arachnida
- Order: Araneae
- Infraorder: Mygalomorphae
- Family: Theraphosidae
- Genus: Grammostola
- Species: G. actaeon

Binomial name
- Grammostola actaeon (Pocock, 1903)

Species of spider

Grammostola actaeon is a New World spider also known as the Brazilian redrump or the Brazilian wooly black. It is commonly found in southern Brazil and parts of Uruguay and is remarkably similar to Grammostola gigantea and Grammostola iheringi. It was first identified in 1903 by British zoologist R.I Pocock.

== Description ==
Females live 15 to 20 years, while males only live to about 6 years. Its namesake red opisthosoma becomes duller with age, but they do keep their other namesake. The rest of the body is a wooly texture and a black color.

== Behavior ==
They are very docile species, and they are not by any means fast. They are not skittish by any means, though they can be quite defensive at times. They often keep themselves out in the open, being a terrestrial tarantula from the New World.
