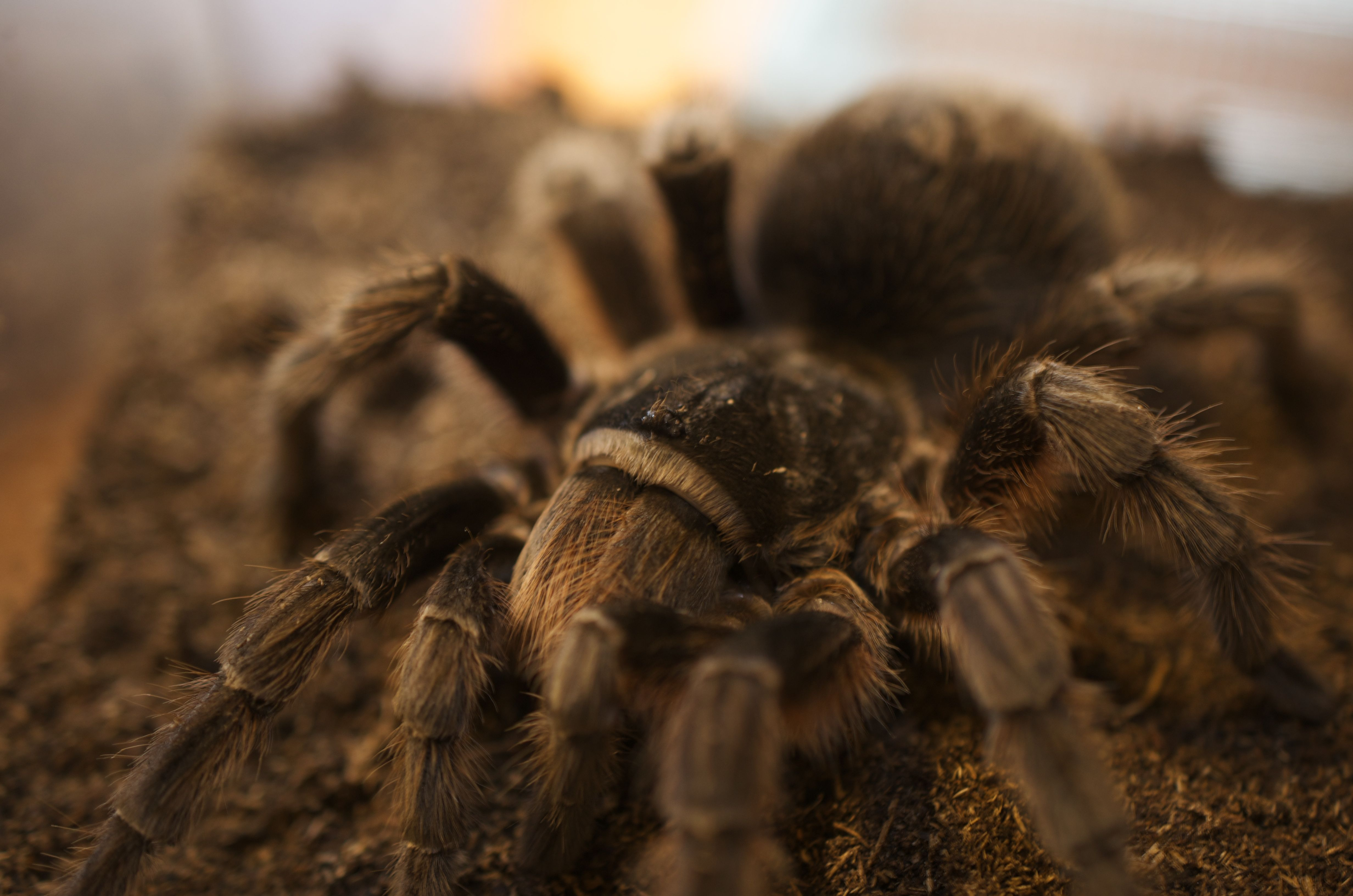

Scientific classification
- Kingdom: Animalia
- Phylum: Arthropoda
- Subphylum: Chelicerata
- Class: Arachnida
- Order: Araneae
- Infraorder: Mygalomorphae
- Family: Theraphosidae
- Genus: Grammostola
- Species: G. alticeps

Binomial name
- Grammostola alticeps (Pocock, 1903)

Synonyms
- Citharoscelus alticeps Pocock, 1903

= Grammostola alticeps =

Species of spider

Grammostola alticeps (known as Brazilian greysmoke spider in the pet industry) is a New World spider in the tarantula family (Theraphosidae). It is endemic to Uruguay, Paraguay, and Brazil.

== Description ==
Grammostola alticeps have a light reddish/orange underbelly, and are 6–7 inches in length. In captivity they are fed crickets and roaches.

== Stridulating organ ==
The stridulating organ, used to make a hissing sound (stridulation), consists of a large cluster of fine close-set bristles on the rear surface of the coxa of the palp, and two smaller clusters at the far end of the front surface of the coxa of the first leg, one just above and the other just below the suture.
