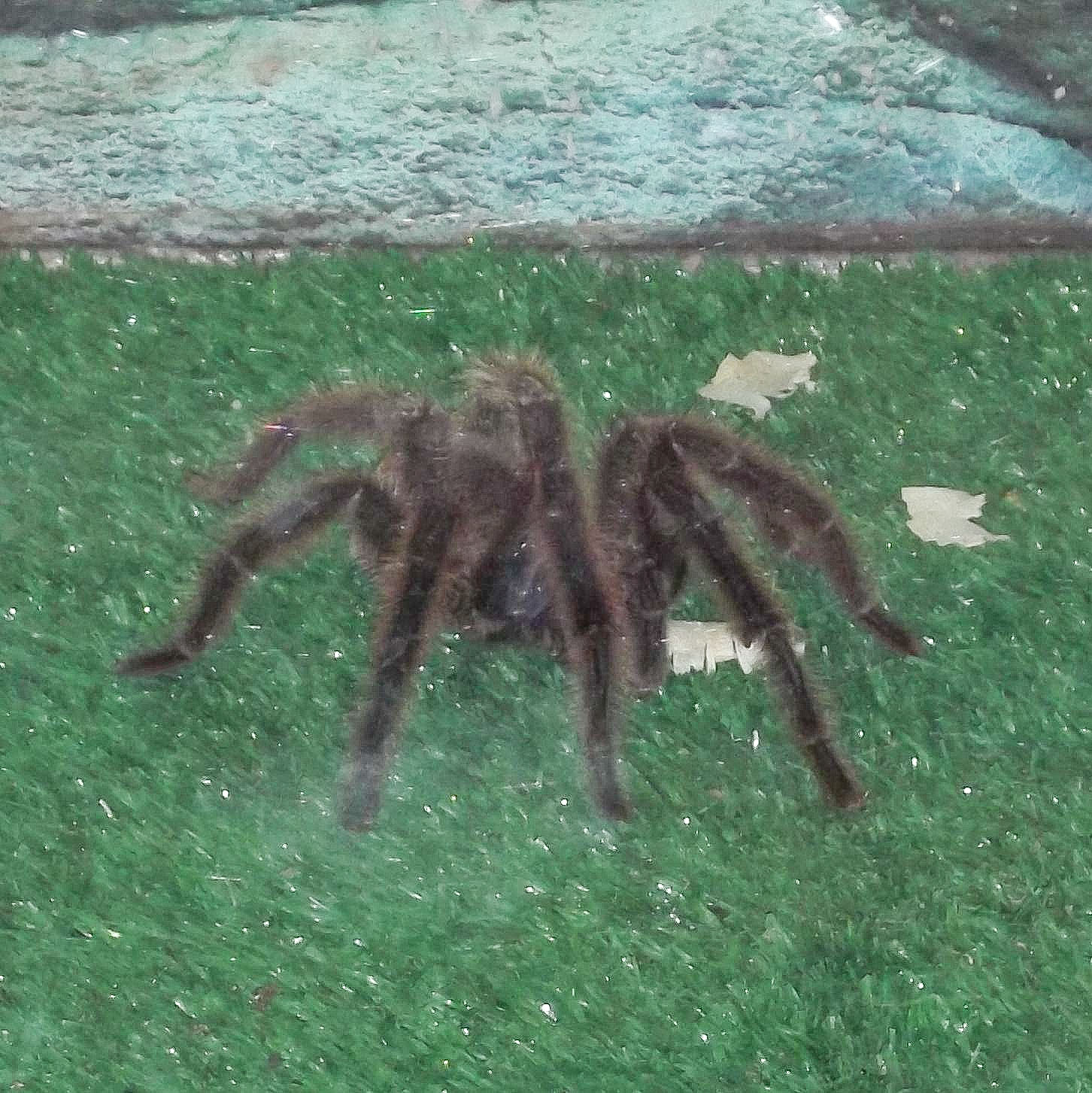
- In Parque Zoológico de Sapucaia do Sul, Brazil

Scientific classification
- Kingdom: Animalia
- Phylum: Arthropoda
- Subphylum: Chelicerata
- Class: Arachnida
- Order: Araneae
- Infraorder: Mygalomorphae
- Family: Theraphosidae
- Genus: Grammostola
- Species: G. anthracina

Binomial name
- Grammostola anthracina (C.L. Koch, 1842)

Synonyms
- Mygale anthracina C.L. Koch, 1842; Eurypelma anthracina (C.L. Koch, 1850); Eurypelma anthracinum (Roewer, 1942); Eurypelma mollicomum Ausserer, 1875; Citharoscelus mollicomus (Pocock, 1903); Grammostola mollicoma (Simon, 1903); Phrixotrichus mollicomus (Pérez-Miles, 1996); Avicularia anthracina (Platnick, 2010)

= Grammostola anthracina =

Species of spider

Grammostola anthracina is a species of spider belonging to the family Theraphosidae (tarantulas). It is found in Uruguay, Paraguay, Brazil, and Argentina.

== Taxonomy ==
The species was first described in 1842 by Carl Ludwig Koch as Mygale anthracina. In 1850, he transferred it to his subgenus Eurypelma using the name (Mygale) Eurypelma anthracina, although Eurypelma was treated as a valid genus by later authors. (As the Greek word pelma is neuter, the correct form of the species name in this combination is anthracinum, as used by Carl Friedrich Roewer in 1942, for example.) Much later, Robert Raven (1985) synonymized Eurypelma with Avicularia (though this had previously been done by Thorell 1870 it had been ignored), implicitly transferring the species to this latter genus Avicularia. A re-examination of the holotype in 2011 suggested that it actually belonged to the genus Grammostola.

== Description ==
Grammostola anthracina is characterized by having an entirely brown body; females have long spermathecae with a rounded apex. The total length of a female's body is about 45 mm; the fourth (last) leg is longest at about 60 mm. The forward-facing side of the coxa of the first leg has stridulatory hairs. Urticating hairs of types III and IV are present on the upper surface of the abdomen. The form of the spermathecae, stridulatory hairs and urticating hairs are characteristic of the genus Grammostola.
