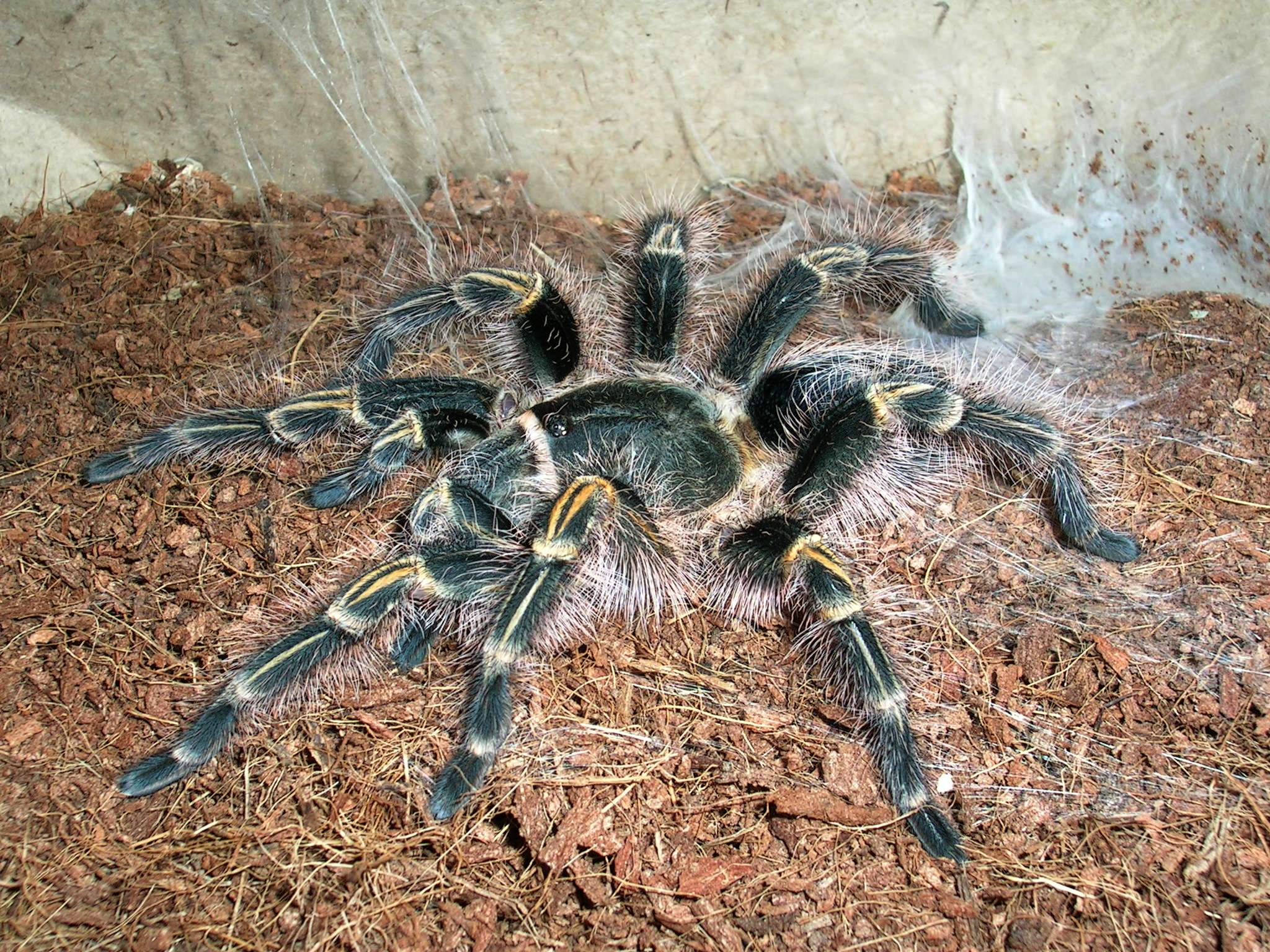

Scientific classification
- Kingdom: Animalia
- Phylum: Arthropoda
- Subphylum: Chelicerata
- Class: Arachnida
- Order: Araneae
- Infraorder: Mygalomorphae
- Family: Theraphosidae
- Genus: Grammostola
- Species: G. pulchripes

Binomial name
- Grammostola pulchripes (Simon, 1892)

Synonyms
- Grammostola aureostriata Schmidt & Bulmer, 2001; Grammostola aureostriata

= Grammostola pulchripes =

Species of spider

One of the larger species of tarantula, the Chaco golden knee (Grammostola pulchripes), formerly known as Grammostola aureostriata, can be expected to reach between 20 and 22 cm (8.5 in).

== Name ==
The former (and very commonly used) species name, aureostriata, is derived from Latin aureus "golden" and striatus "striped". The currently used species name, "pulchripes," is derived from Latin "pulchra", meaning "beautiful", and "pes", meaning "foot".

== Description and behavior ==
The Chaco golden knee is a large tarantula, being able to reach between 7 and 8 inches in legspan (17.8-20.3 cm). Being a terrestrial tarantula, it has a heavy body. Mature males have longer legs and smaller bodies than females, and they possess tibial hooks or apophyses to hold back a female's fangs during mating. Males also possess modified pedipalps to insert sperm into the female's genital operculum. It exhibits a multitude of colors, with bright yellowish leg stripes, dark black "femurs", and pink hairs all over its body. As with the rest of the genus Grammostola, the Chaco golden knee has very large fangs, and the carapace (the top of the prosoma) is raised to make room for the large chelicerae. It has rudimentary eyesight, and senses its environment with the setae all over its body, feeling vibrations through the ground and air, and picking up chemical signatures, similar to a sense of smell.

== Natural habitat ==
The Chaco golden knee tarantulas are known to inhabit the grasslands of Argentina and Paraguay. As such, they are adapted to generally warm climate, with alternating dry and rainy seasons.

== As a pet ==
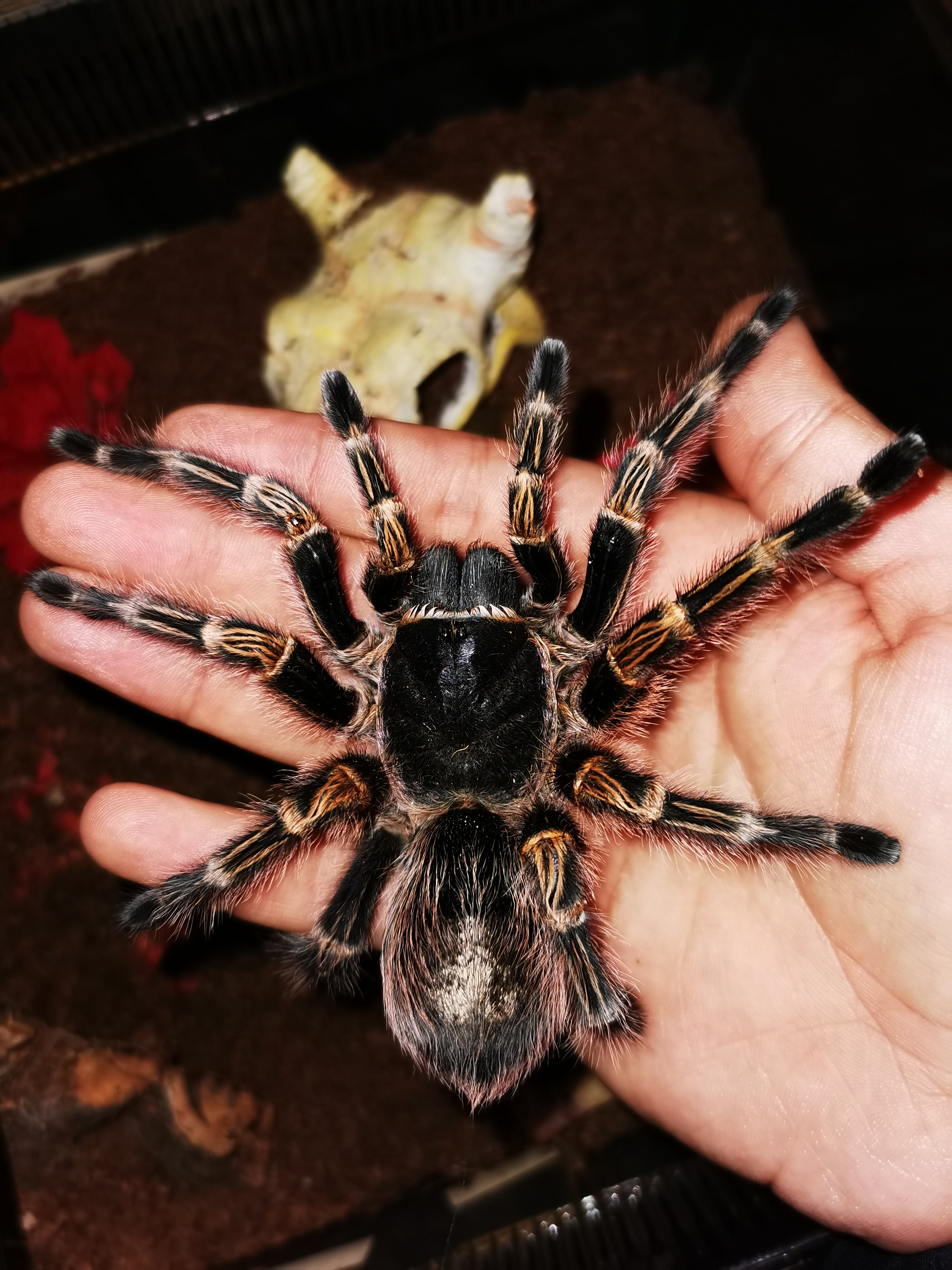
G. pulchripes in captivity

The Chaco golden knee is a very calm and docile tarantula, which, along with its striking appearance and large size, makes it an attractive pet. It frequently sits in plain view in captivity, and likes to shove substrate around, especially at young ages. Females can live for well over twenty years, while males only live for about five or six years.

When it was first imported into the pet trade, it was thought to be a variant of the Pink zebra beauty, but it is significantly larger and can be distinguished by the size difference and coloring.

== Gallery ==
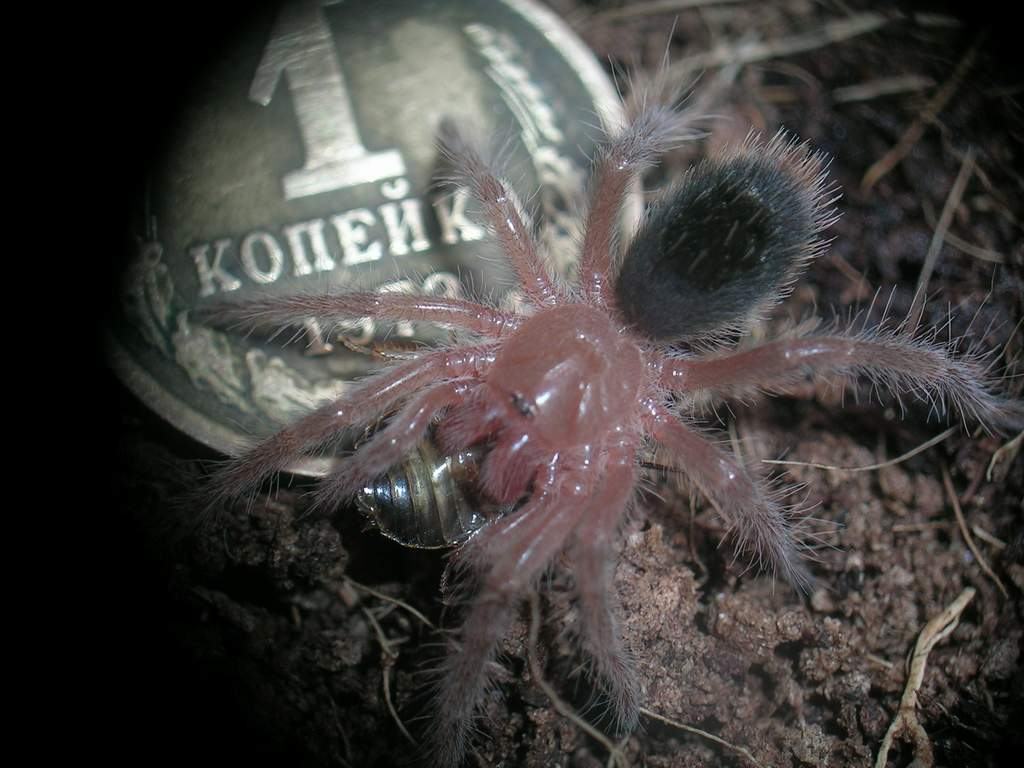
Spiderling feeding on Blaptica dubia

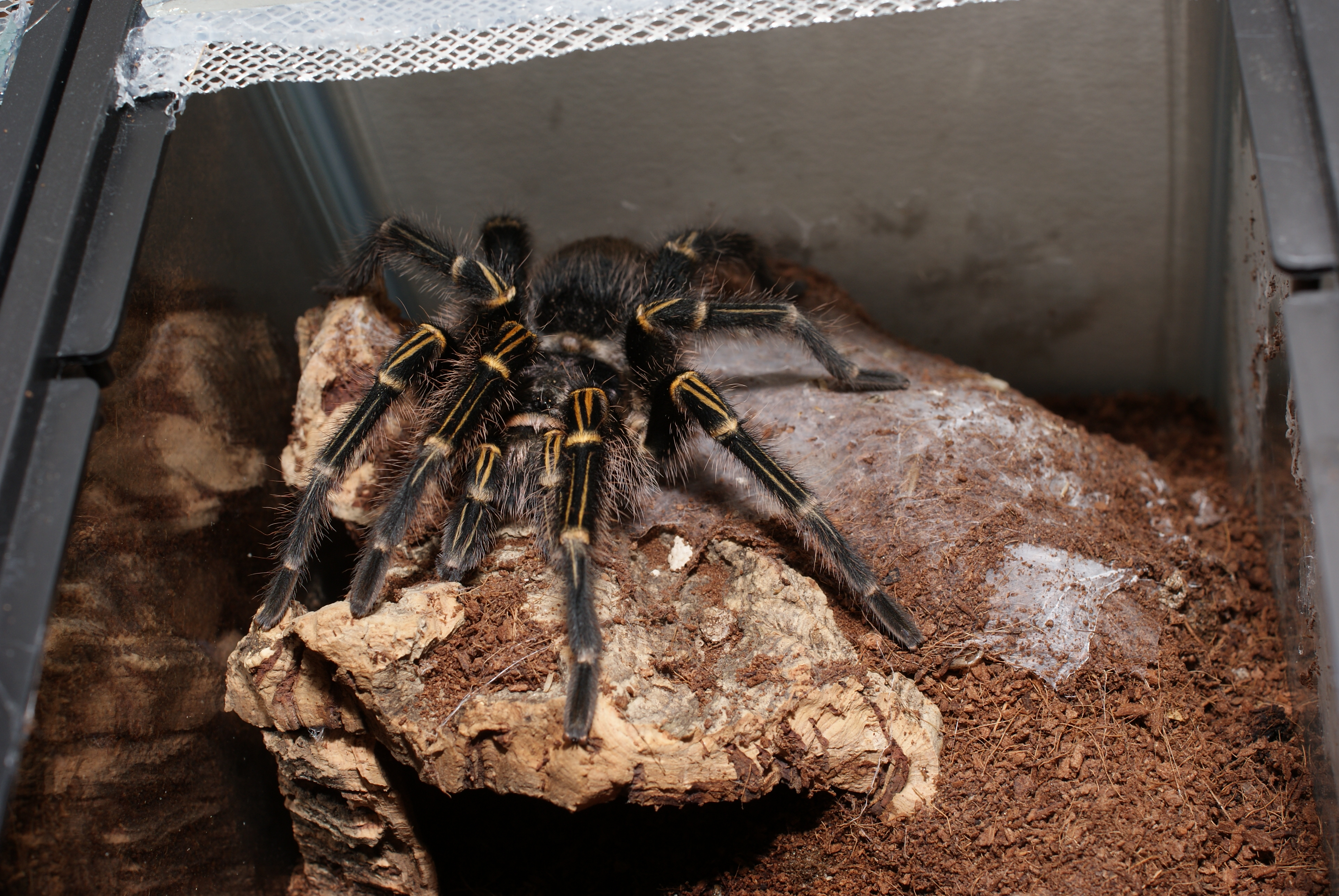
Mature male Chaco

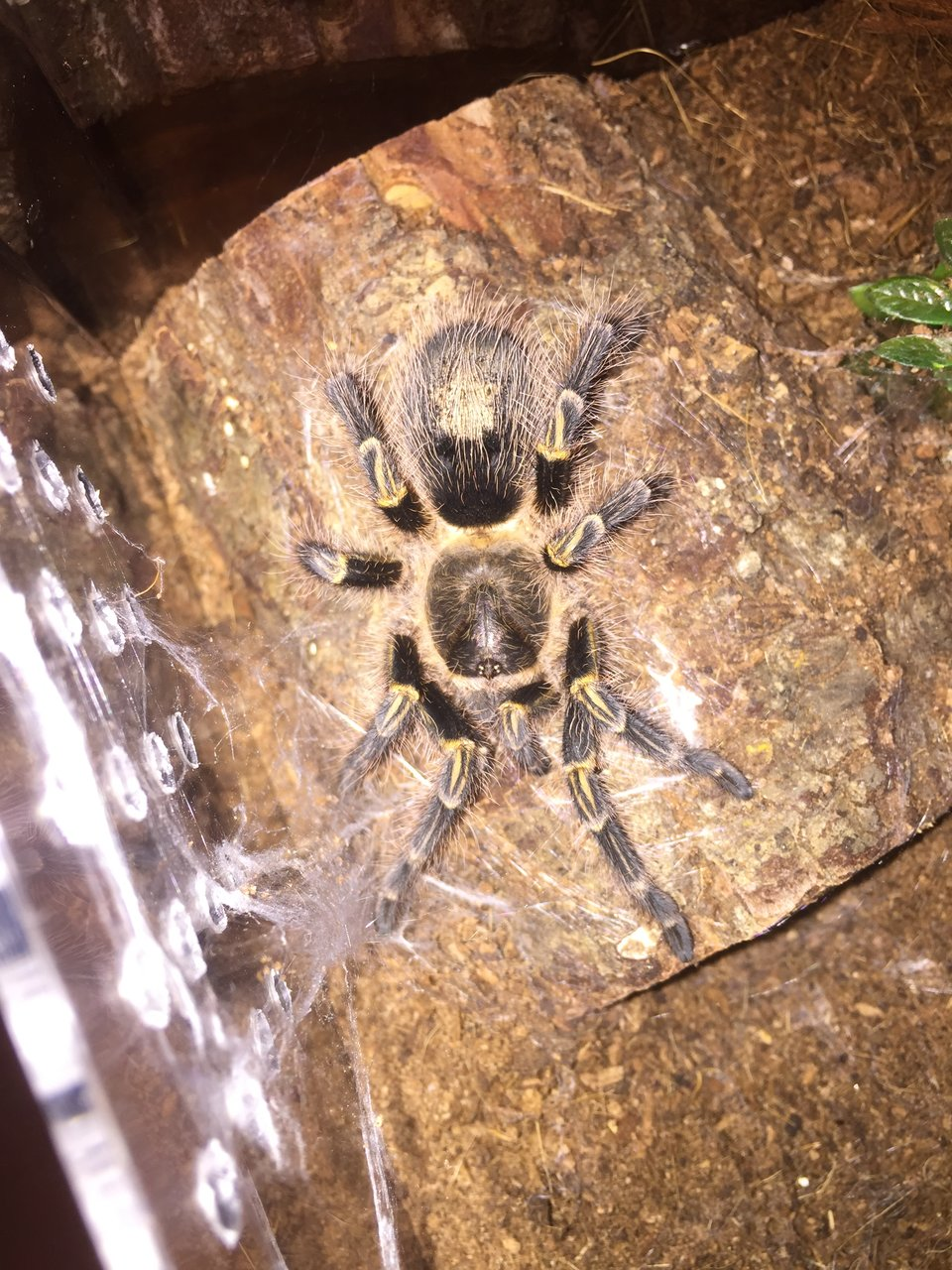
Juvenile female in captivity

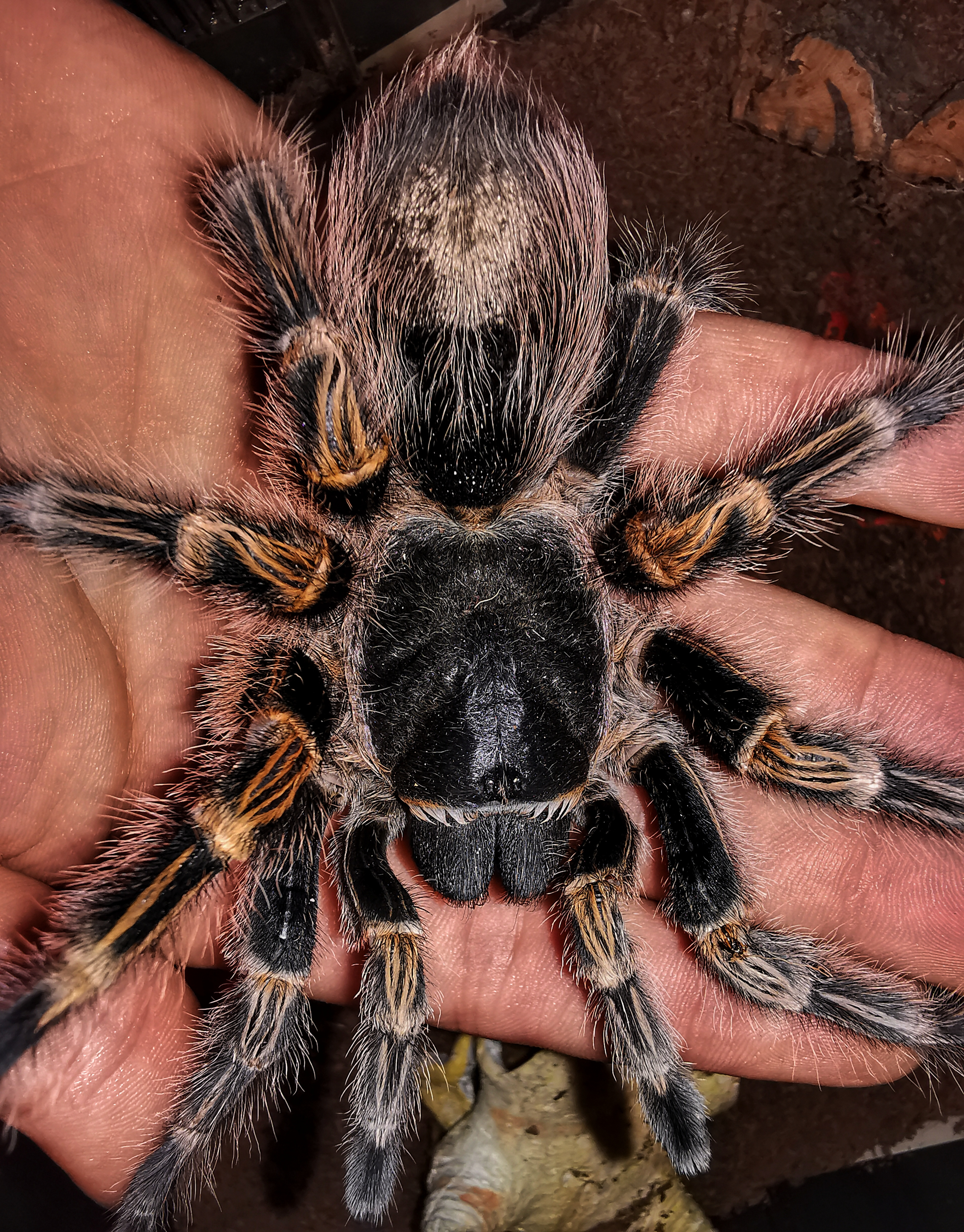
Young female G. pulchripes
