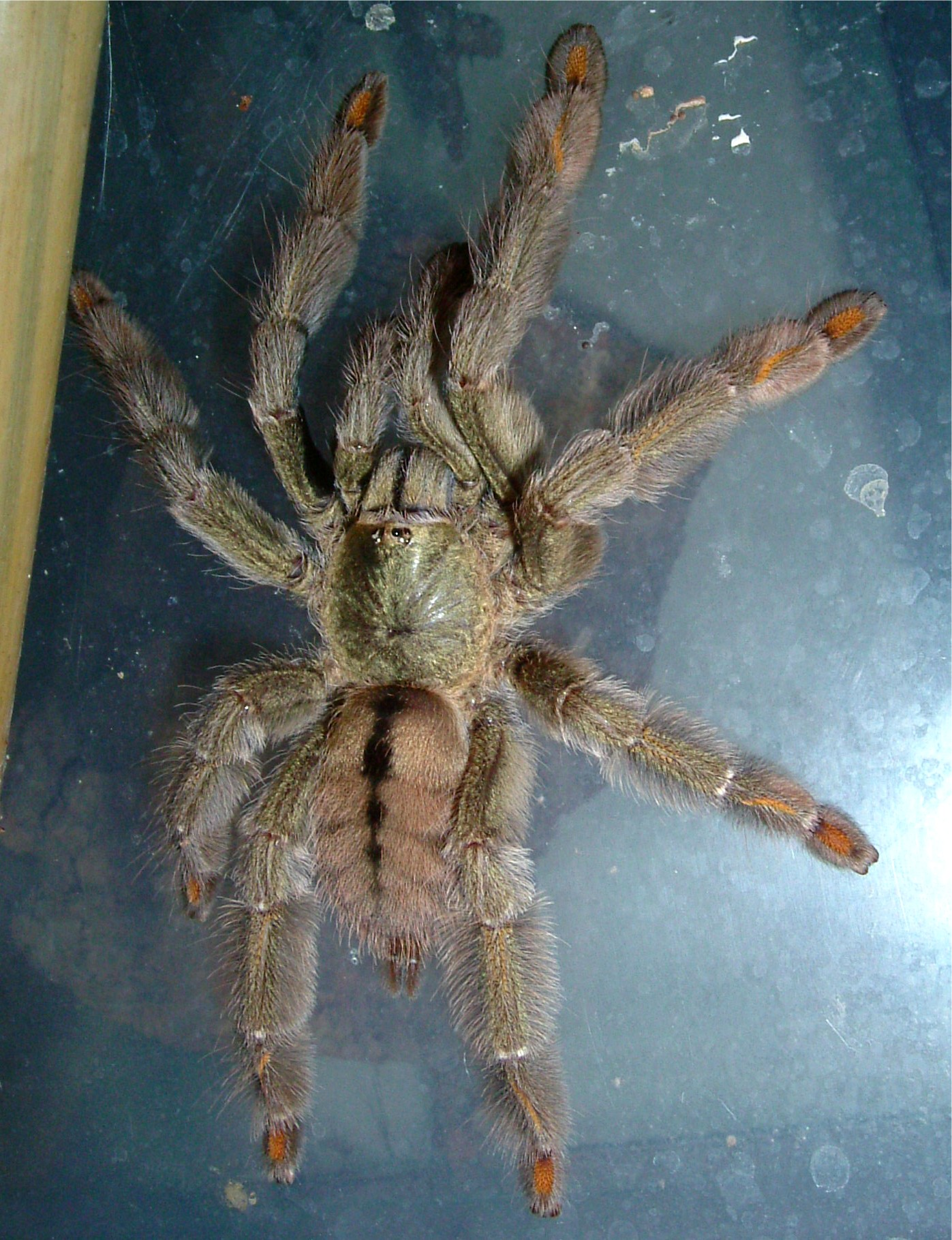
- Female
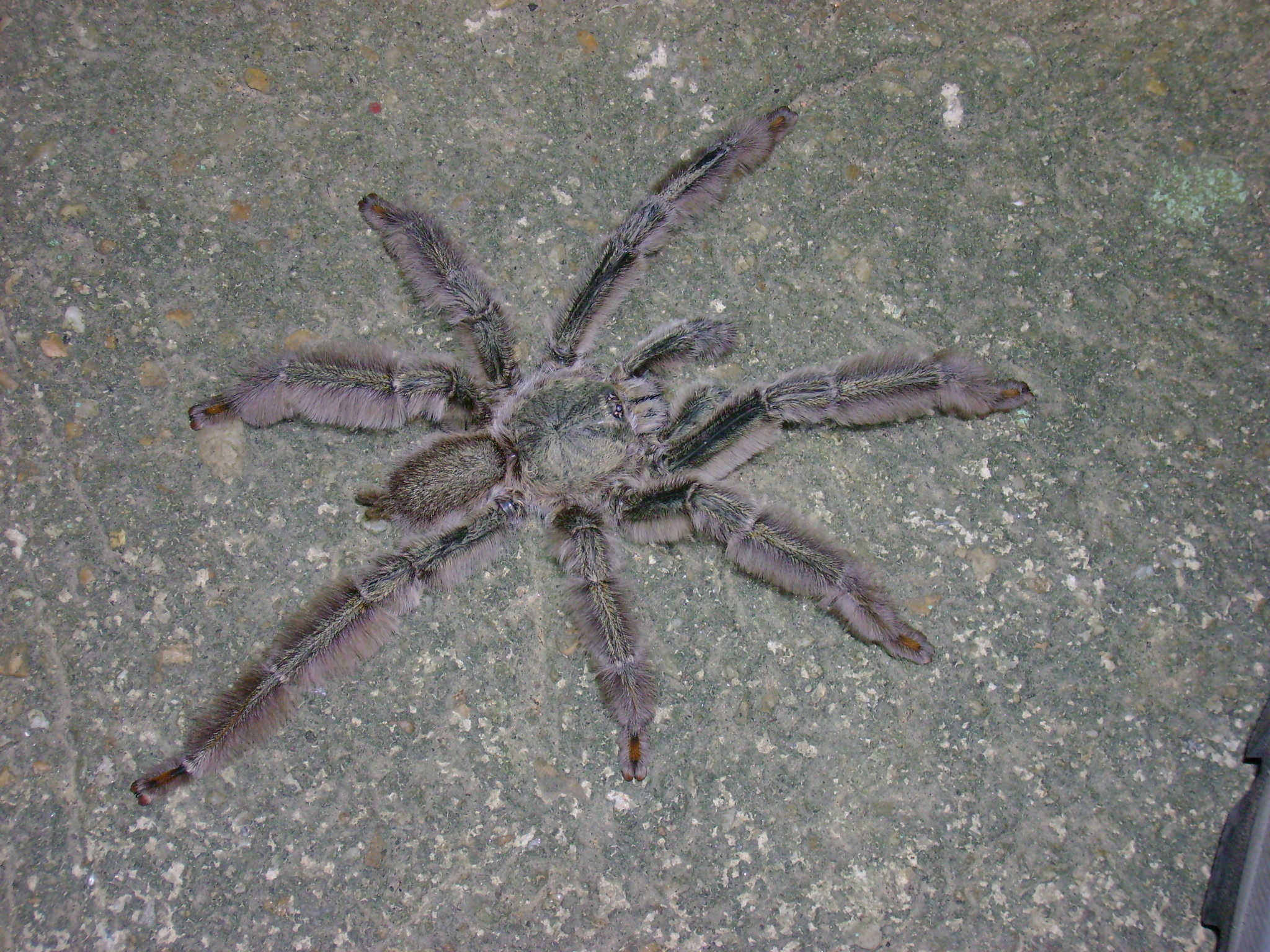
- Mature Male

Scientific classification
- Kingdom: Animalia
- Phylum: Arthropoda
- Subphylum: Chelicerata
- Class: Arachnida
- Order: Araneae
- Infraorder: Mygalomorphae
- Family: Theraphosidae
- Genus: Psalmopoeus
- Species: P. cambridgei

Binomial name
- Psalmopoeus cambridgei Pocock, 1895

= Psalmopoeus cambridgei =

Species of spider

Psalmopoeus cambridgei, the Trinidad chevron tarantula, is a species of spider in the family Theraphosidae, endemic to Trinidad.

This species' venom has been the subject of study for potential pharmaceutical uses. Elements of, or the study of Psalmotoxin may be of therapeutic use in developing analgesic medications, management for glioma and breast cancer, and treatments for patients suffering a stroke. It is also of interest for potential benefits in managing cartilage damage in rheumatoid arthritis, alongside venoms of other animals.

P. cambridgei is kept as an exotic pet alongside others in its genus, being commonly bred in captivity.

== Description ==
The female has dark, chevron-shaped markings on the abdomen and her color varies through shades of green, tan and brown, with characteristic orange markings on the legs, similar to P. irminia.

The male, upon sexual maturity, is sexually dimorphic, colored a more uniform grey or brown, with long legs in proportion to its body, and gaining copulatory organs on his pedipalps. He retains the orange markings on the latter part of his legs.

As spiderlings, P. cambridgei have a dark carapace and dark legs, each with a pale orange band resembling "leg warmers", the abomen appears black with a thick orange chevron marking, and thin black stripe down the center. The bands fade over time as the animal grows and undergoes ontogenetic color change.

The male has a significantly shorter lifespan and is of smaller size compared to the female. His sexual maturity marks the latter end of his life, typically quite short and dedicated to reproducing.

== Behaviour ==
P. cambridgei has an arboreal lifestyle. It lives in crevices, holes, or nooks behind bark, above ground, and constructs sheetlike, tubular webbing to line and structure its retreat. This webbing is not for ensnaring prey; theraphosids hunt primarily by ambush, emerging from their retreats at night to wait for prey, which they rely on vibrations to detect, in the same way they detect potential threats.

Like all theraphosid spiders, P. cambridgei is an opportunistic feeder, which will eat whatever prey it can subdue. In captivity it is fed exclusively arthropods, but in the wild may eat a variety of arthropods and small vertebrates that cross its path.

Periodically, it will undergo ecdysis as it grows.

== Taxonomy ==
P. cambridgei is the type species of the genus Psalmopoeus, described by Pocock in 1895. It is distinguished from other genera by the presence of stridulatory setae (lyra) on its maxillae, a trait formerly only seen in Asian and African species.

== Etymology ==
The specific name cambridgei is in honour of the arachnologist F. O. Pickard-Cambridge.

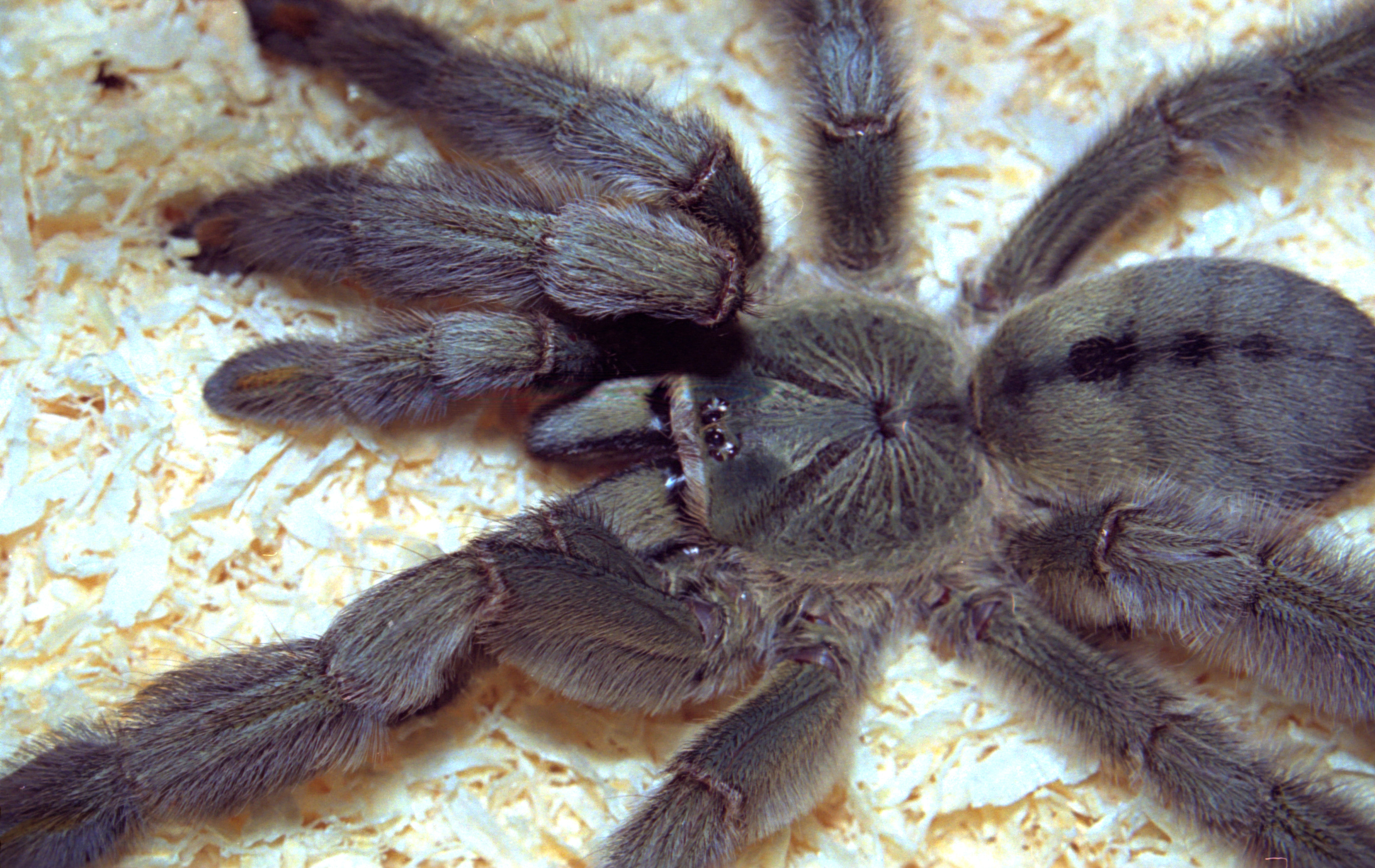
subadult

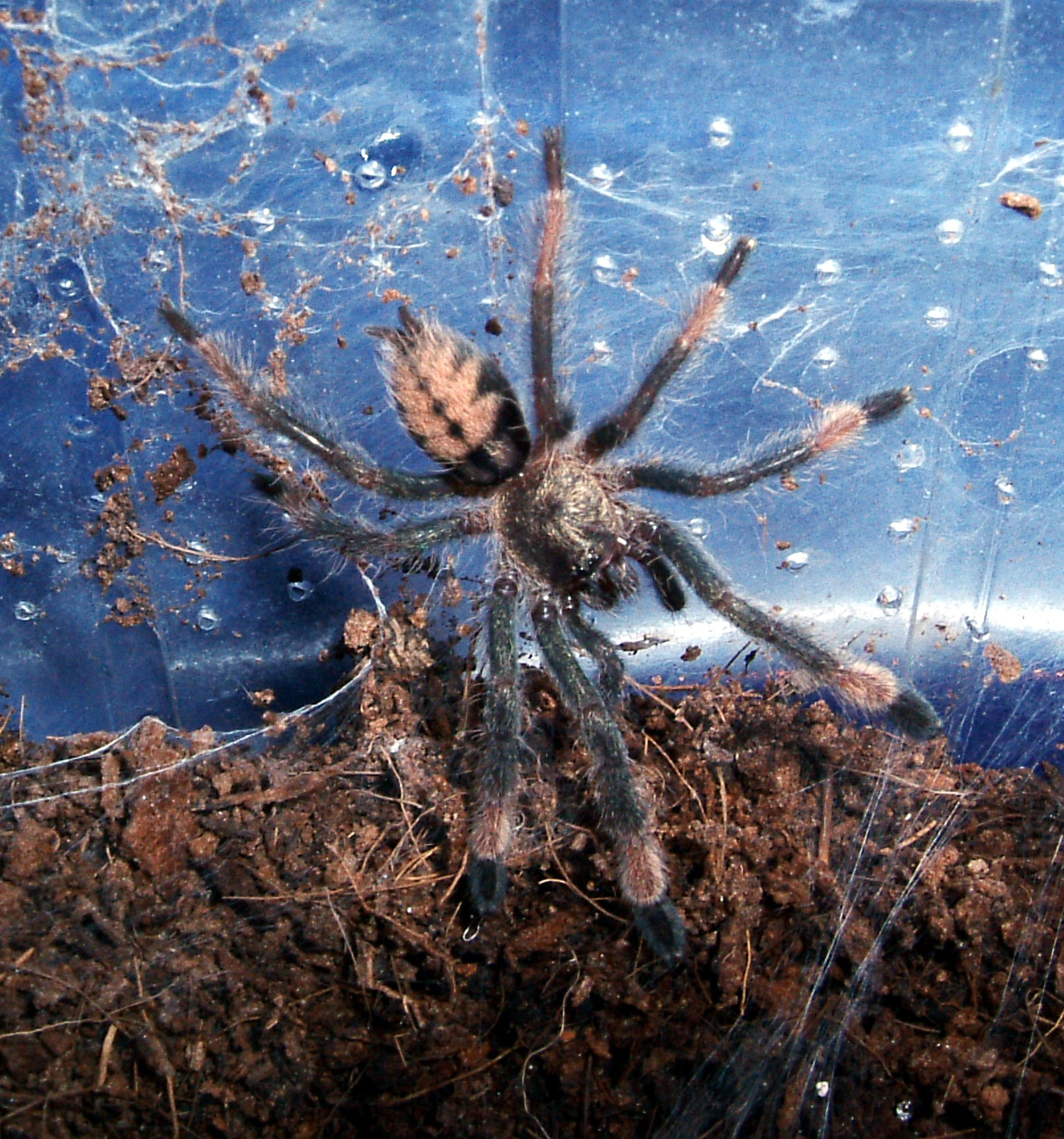
sling

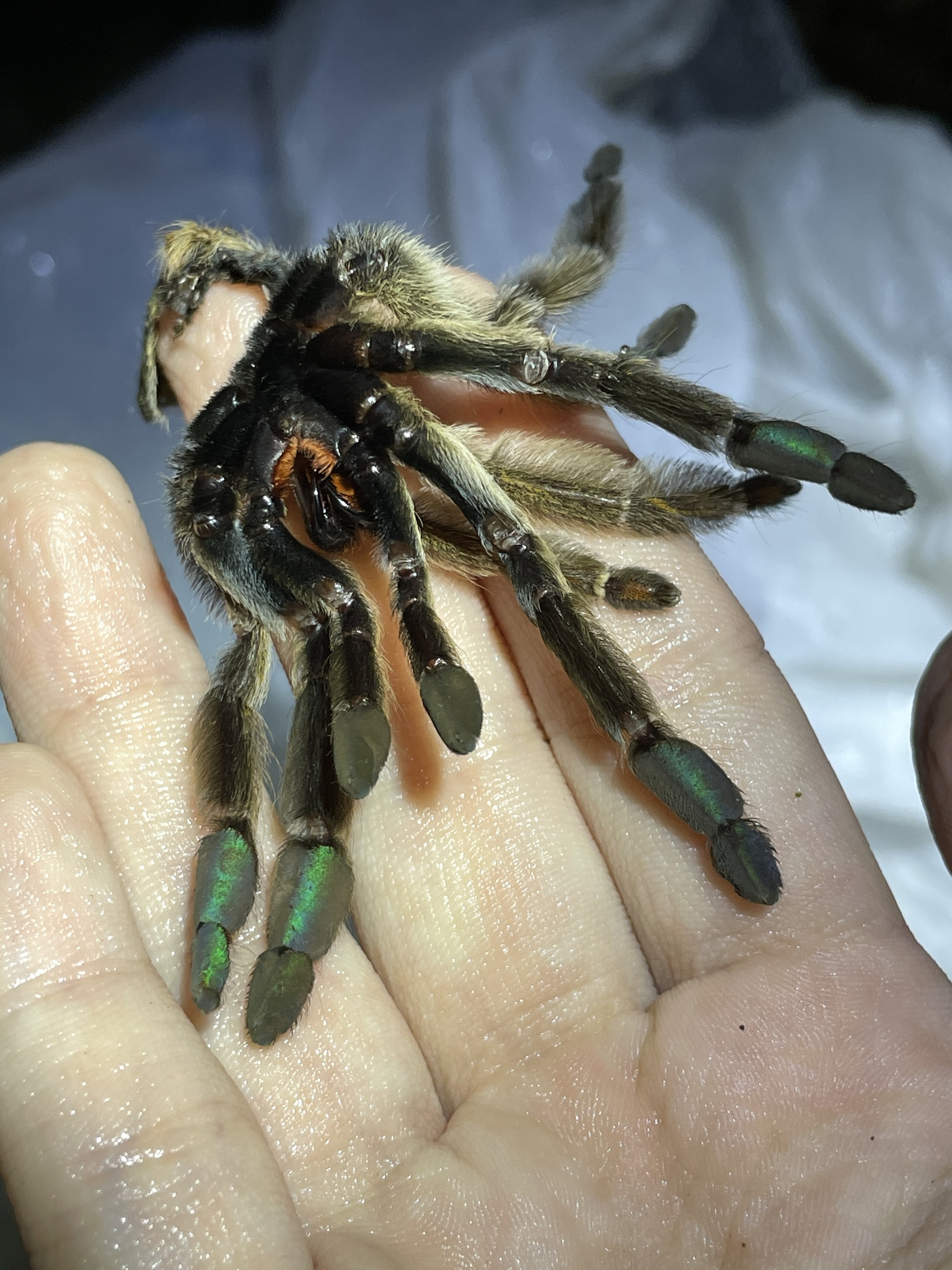
exuvia, showing iridescent undersides of the tarsi and metatarsi

== In captivity ==
P. cambridgei is easily bred in captivity and is not an uncommon species within the Western exotic pet trade today.

They are typically kept in tall, vertical enclosures with a piece of bark (as a piece or intact tube) to use as a retreat, and fed on various arthropods depending on tarantula size, owner preference, and commercial availability. Prey items given in captivity include: insect larvae (eg.Tenebrio molitor, Zophobas atratus, waxworms), cricket species (eg. Acheta domestica, Gryllus bimaculatus), cockroach species (eg. Blaptica dubia, Periplaneta lateralis), and fruit fly species (for small spiderlings).

Despite being a popular pet species, it is difficult to predict the lifespan of, especially in males, whose longevity varies depending on how fast it sexually matures, after which it may live only a matter of months, to over a year. Males in captivity have been seen reaching sexual maturity within a year or two, with females living around 10 years.

As pets

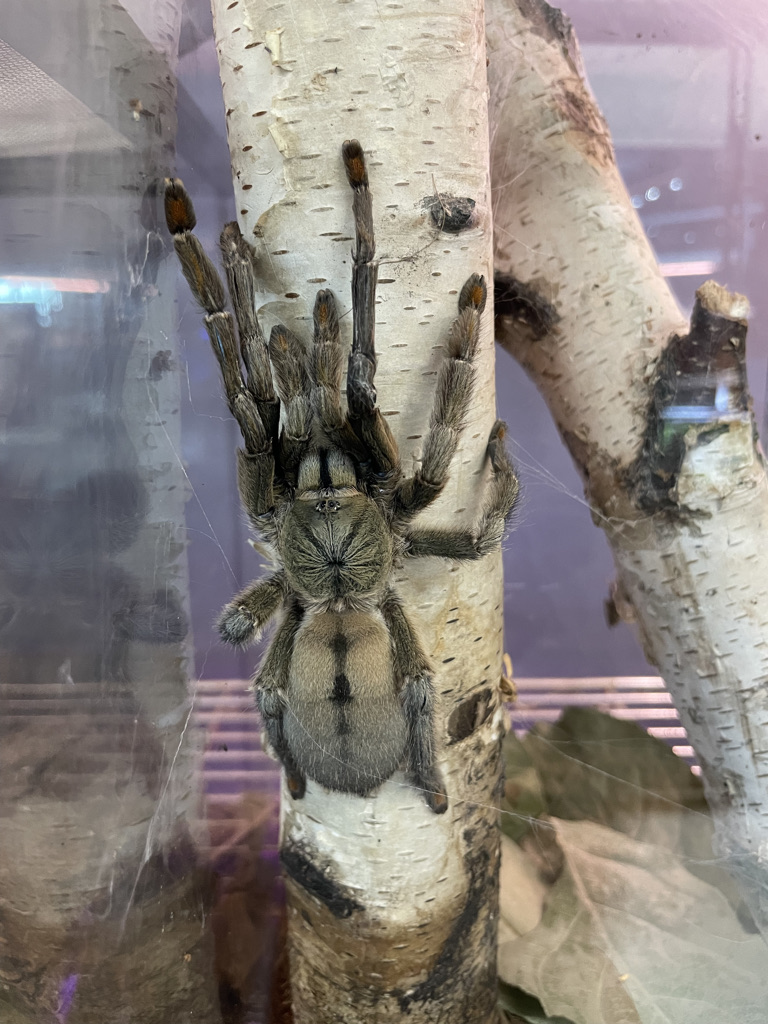
A pet on birch trunks in its enclosure

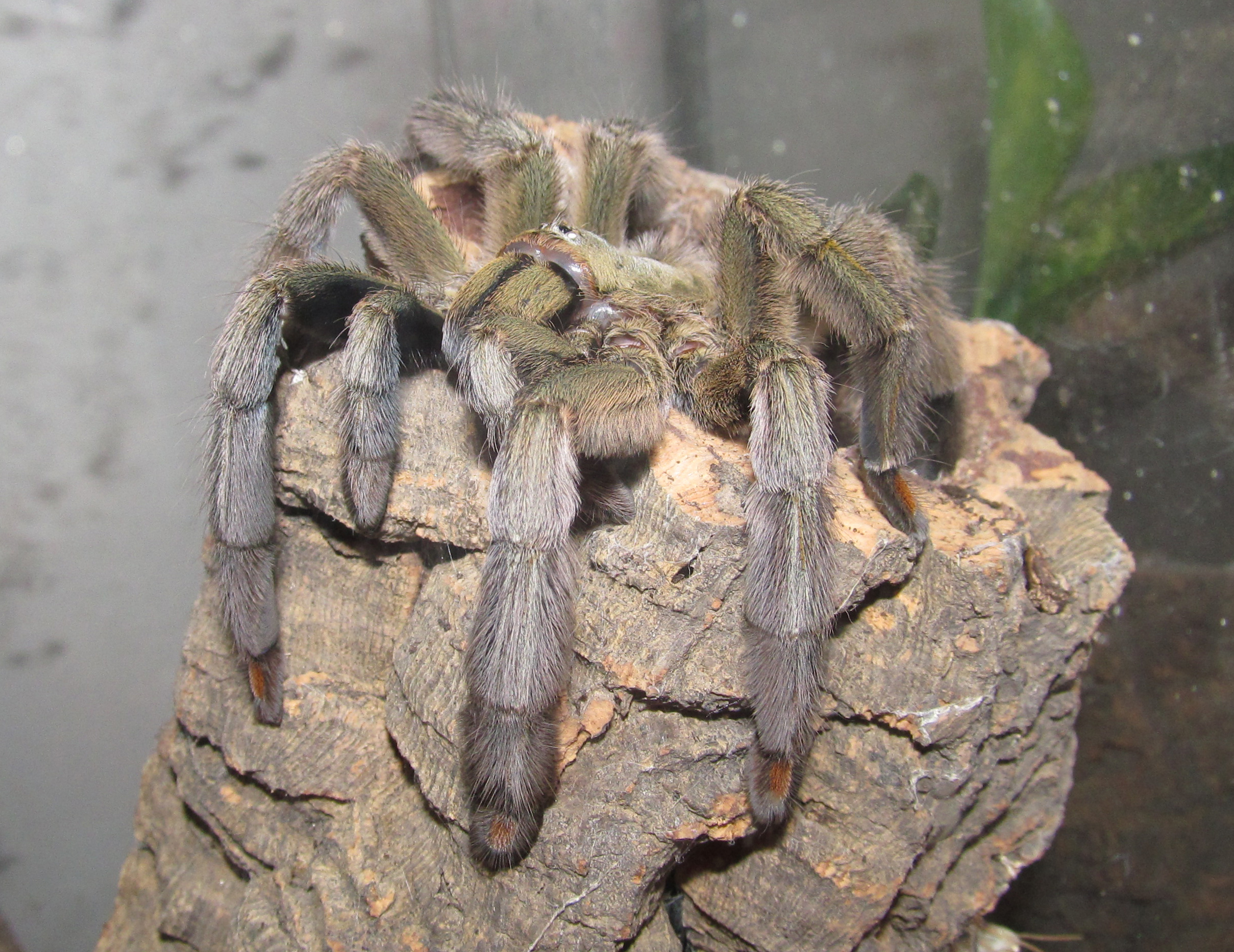
Pet with cork bark tube

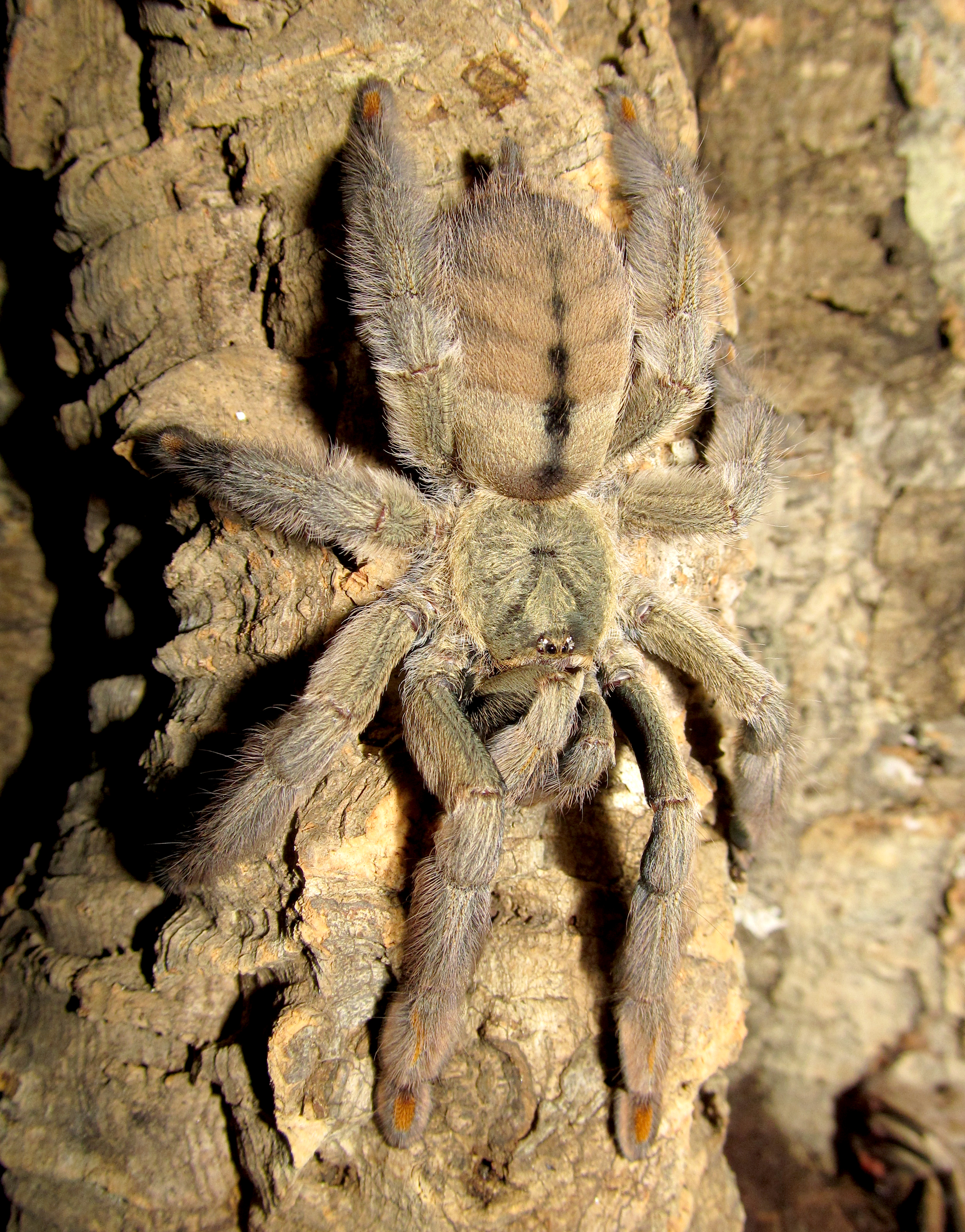

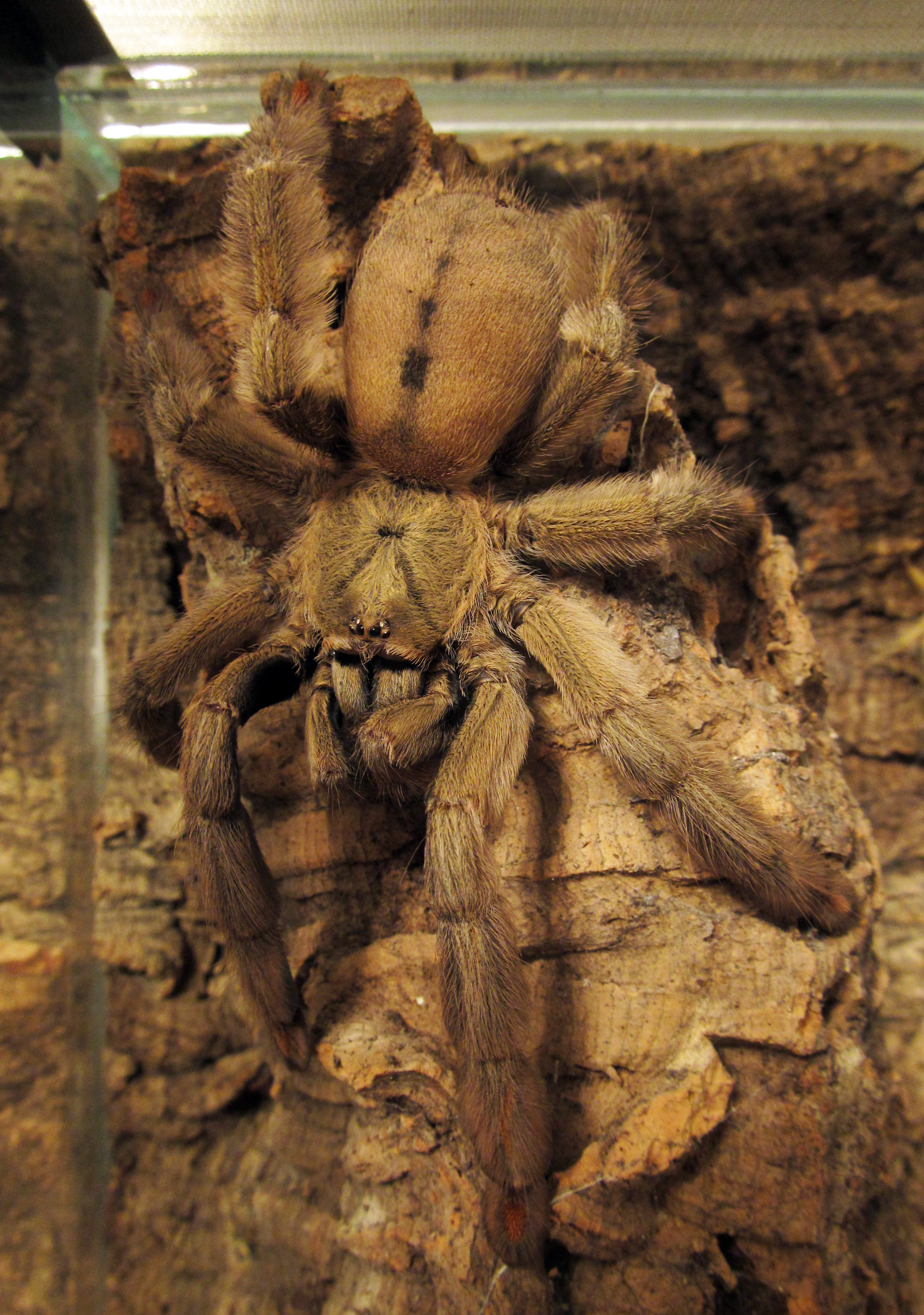
Pet in its enclosure featuring a cork bark background and climbing piece

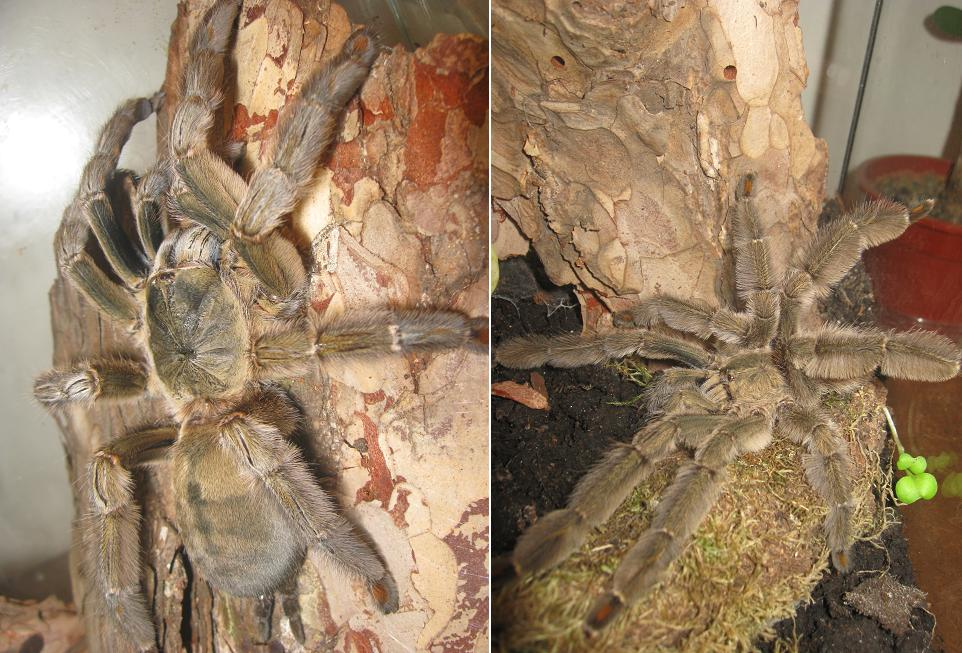
Sexual dimorphism as shown by two captive raised individuals

== Gallery ==
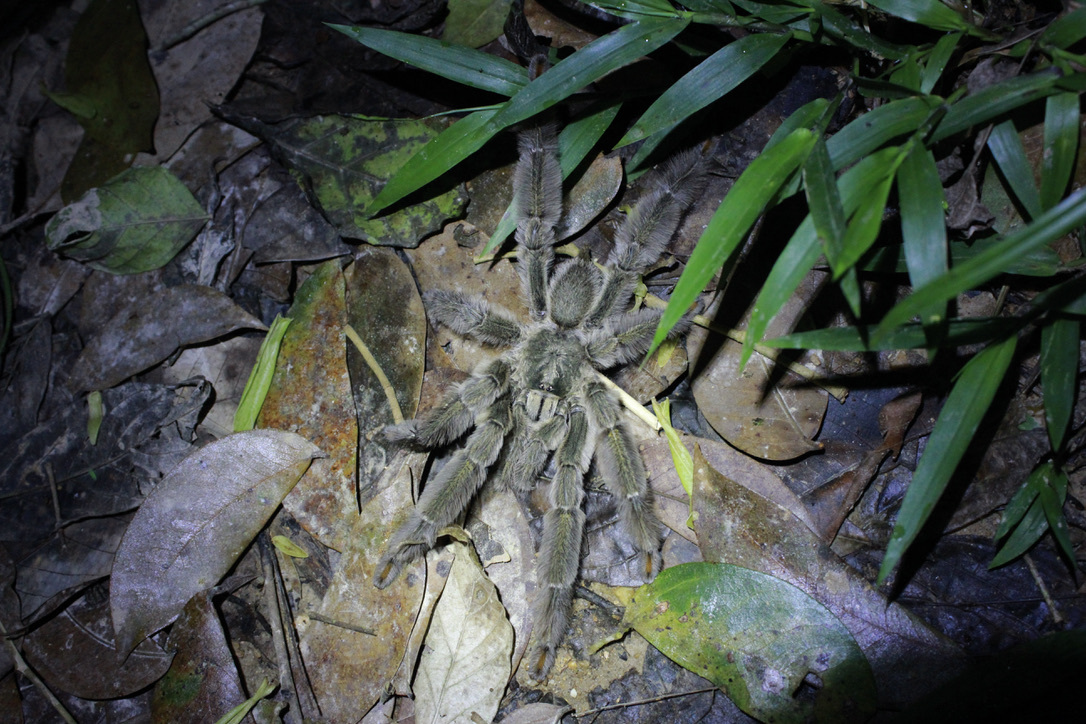
Mature male

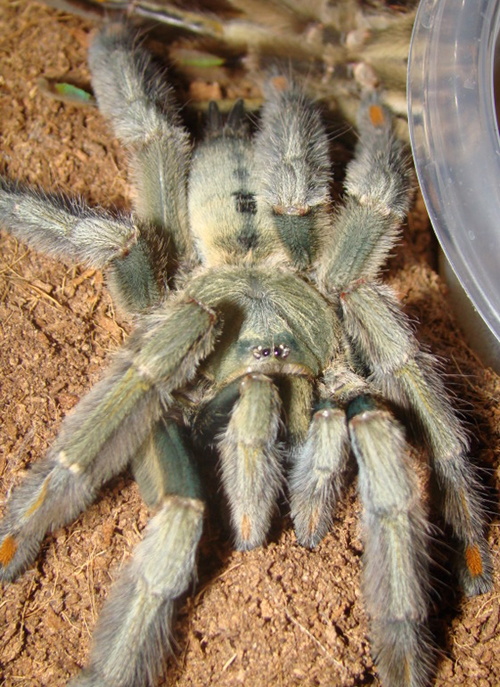
A pet

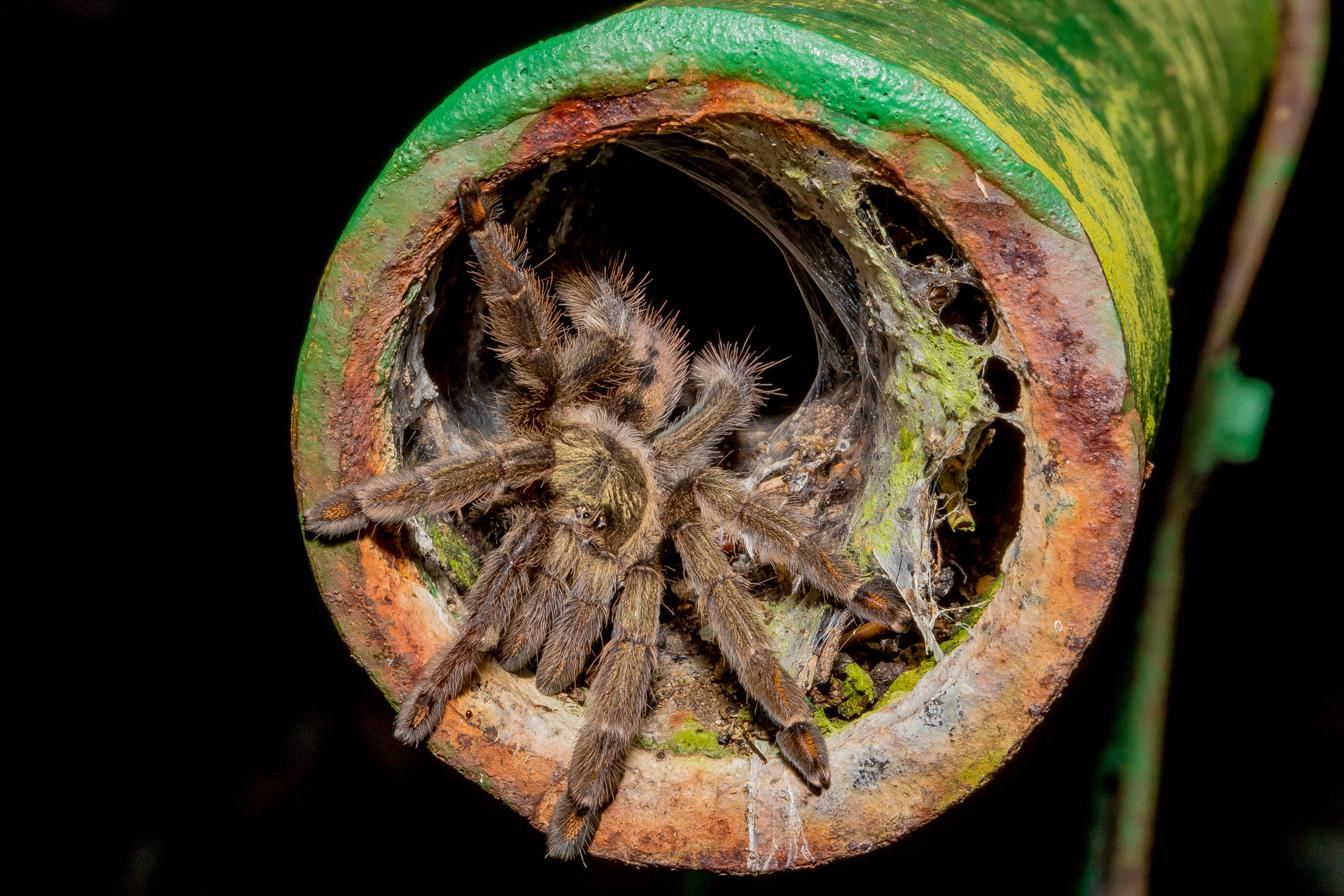
Having made a retreat inside a man-made structure
