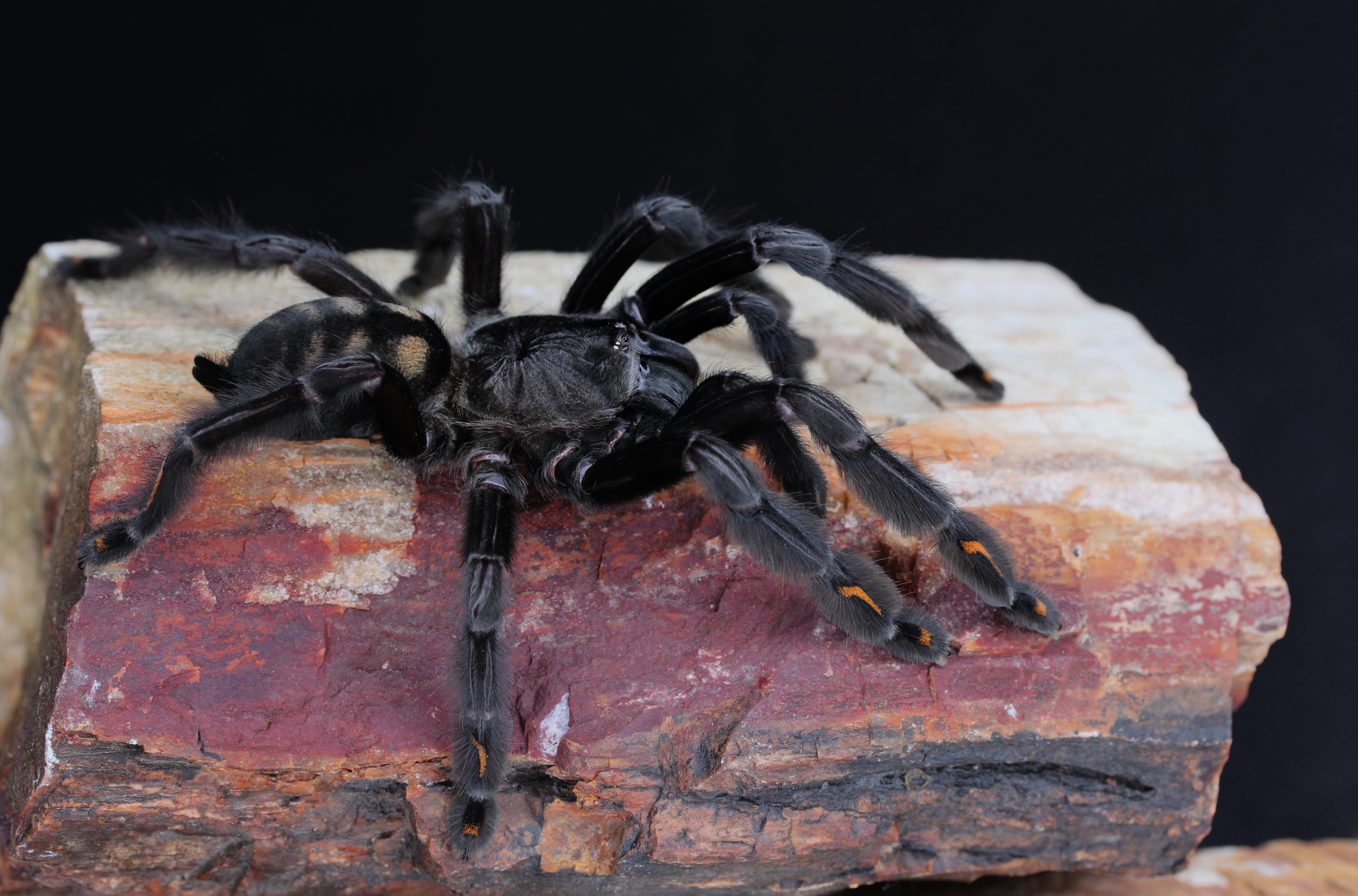
- Mature female
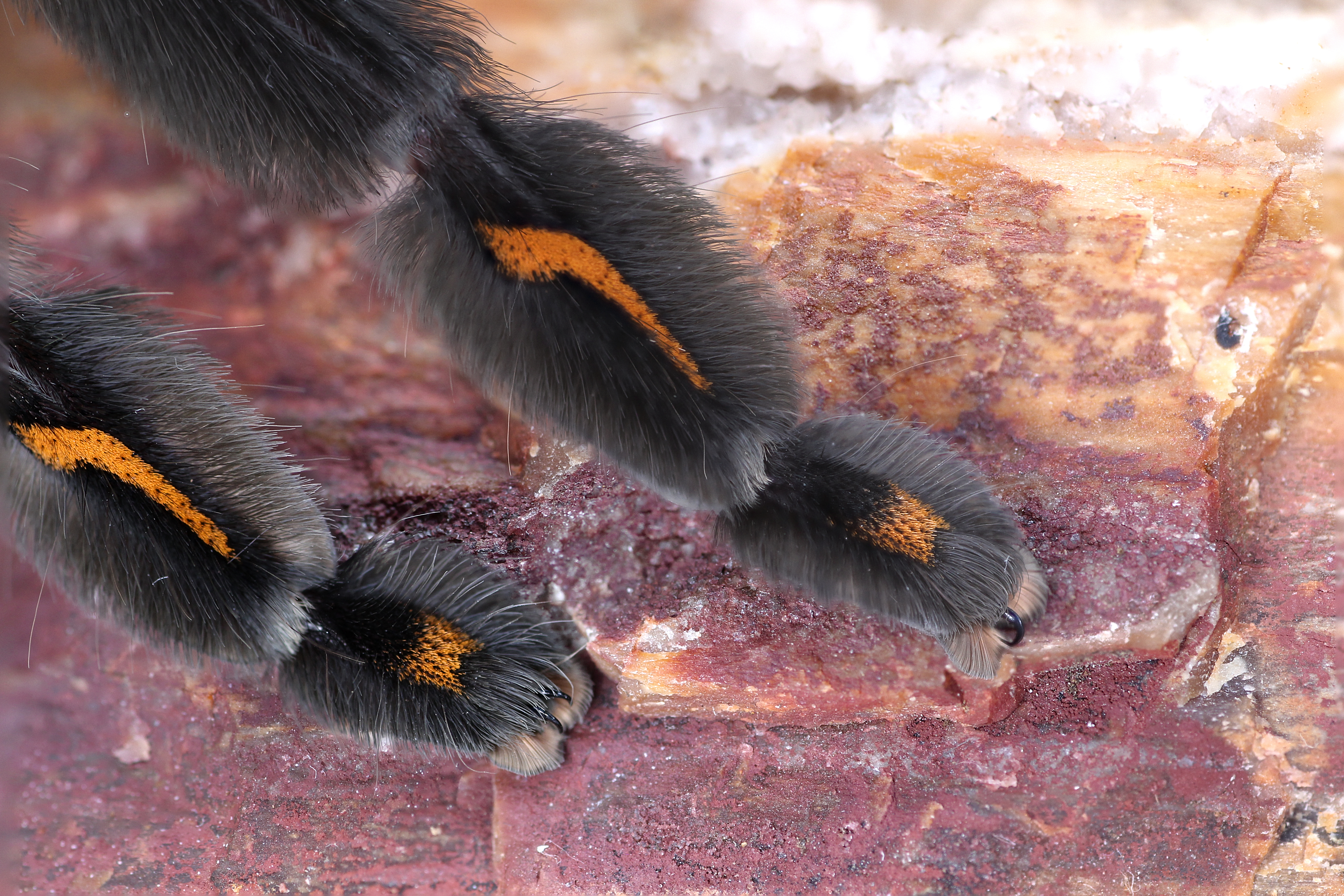
- Metatarsus & tarsus of legs I & II

Scientific classification
- Kingdom: Animalia
- Phylum: Arthropoda
- Subphylum: Chelicerata
- Class: Arachnida
- Order: Araneae
- Infraorder: Mygalomorphae
- Family: Theraphosidae
- Genus: Psalmopoeus
- Species: P. irminia

Binomial name
- Psalmopoeus irminia Saager, 1994

= Psalmopoeus irminia =

Species of spider

Psalmopoeus irminia, commonly known as the Venezuelan suntiger, is a species of arboreal tarantula endemic to Venezuela, Guyana and Brazil.

This is a popular species in the exotic pet trade, largely due to the unique appearance of the female, and can be successfully bred in captivity.

== Description ==
Psalmopoeus irminia is a New World tarantula species, it is black with vibrant orange markings on the abdomen and legs.

Males, once sexually mature, are sexually dimorphic, becoming entirely grey/grey-brown, only retaining orange markings on its tarsi, as well as appearing to have much "leggier" proportions.

== Taxonomy ==
P. irminia was first described in 1994 by F. Saager. The presence of stridulatory setae (hairs), also called lyra, on the maxillae distinguishes it as a Psalmopoeus species. This trait is absent in all other described New World species, and is thus a unique diagnostic criterion for Psalmopoeus.

== Behavior ==
P. irminia have a diet that mainly consists of invertebrates. They have been observed living in crevices and holes above ground, lined with sheetlike or tubular webbing that can have material from the environment (eg. leaf litter) incorporated into them. They construct similar structures in captivity.

When threatened, this species may flee into its retreat, or throw a threat posture in an attempt to deter predators, raising its front legs and showing its fangs. Psalmopoeus species lack urticating hairs typical of most New World species, instead, their primary modes of defence are aposematic display or aggression (biting), if they cannot evade a threat. The undersides of its tarsi and metatarsi and iridescent, which are visible during this display, and likely to aid in it.

== Molting and life cycle ==
In order to grow, theraphosid species must undergo ecdysis (shedding the exoskeleton). Tarantulas moult periodically throughout their lifespan, this process leaves them particularly vulnerable to predation and other harm both during and for a limited time after, as the new exoskeleton hardens.

P. irminia spiderlings have an orange-red carapace, black legs with pale metatarsi, and a black abdomen with markings resembling the adult's chevron pattern. As the spiderlings grow, they begin to gradually develop the black carapace, legs and orange markings, with each consecutive moult. Eventually, both sexes will become black, with orange "flame" leg markings, and abdominal pattern. The female remains this color throughout her life, while the male emerges almost entirely grey upon his moult into sexual maturity.

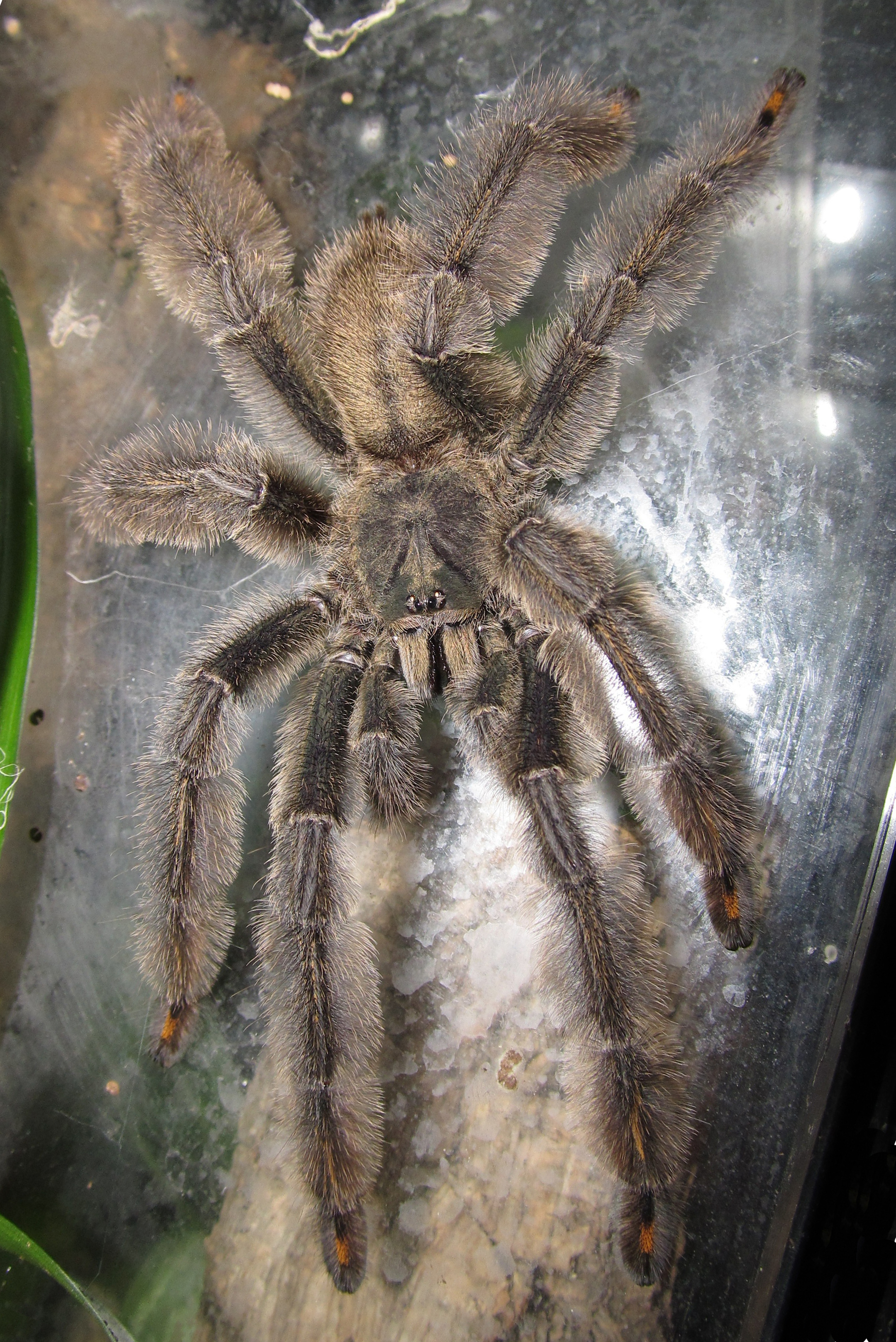
A mature male, note the resemblance to Psalmopoeus cambridgei

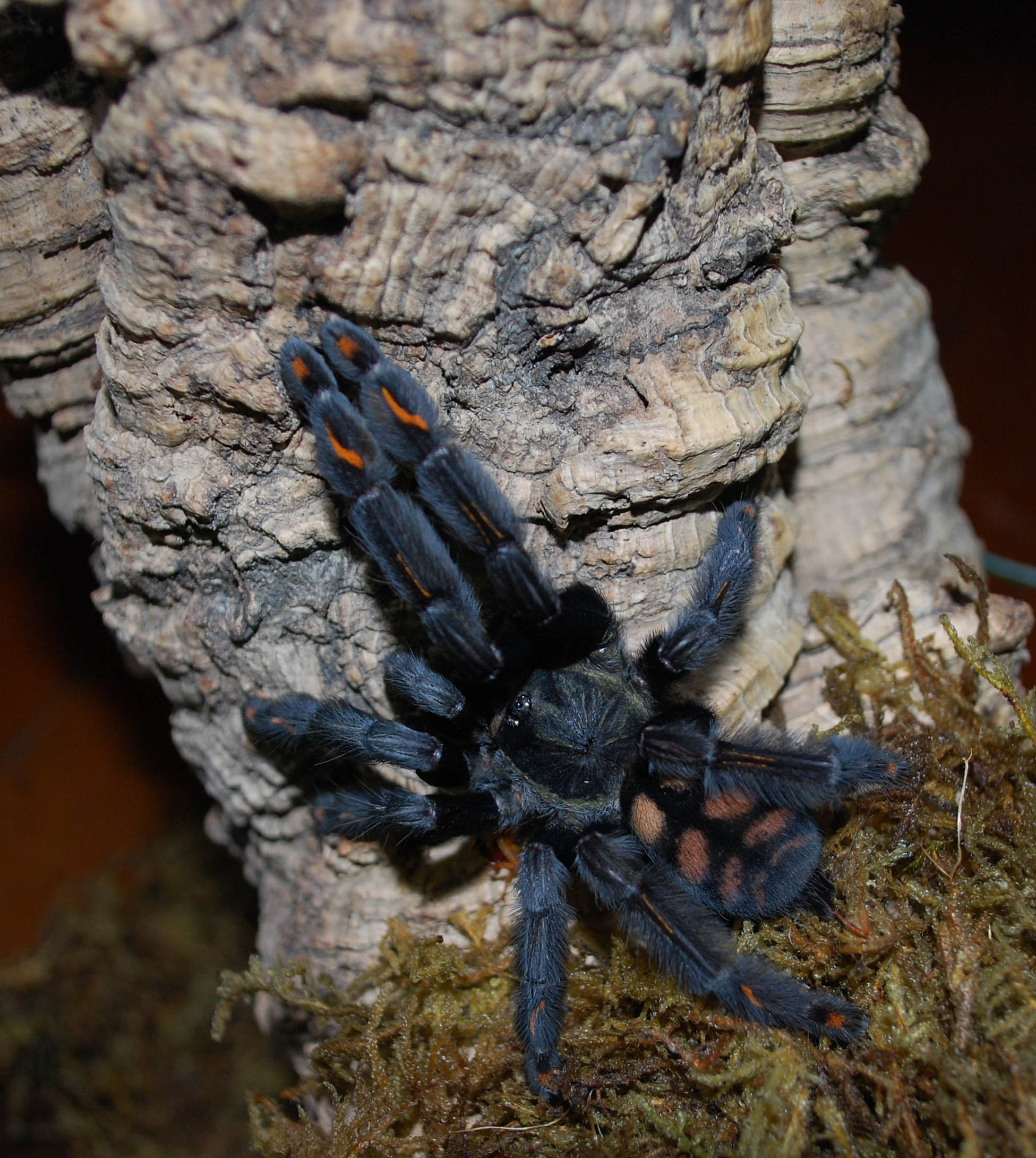
In captivity, showing subadult and adult female coloration

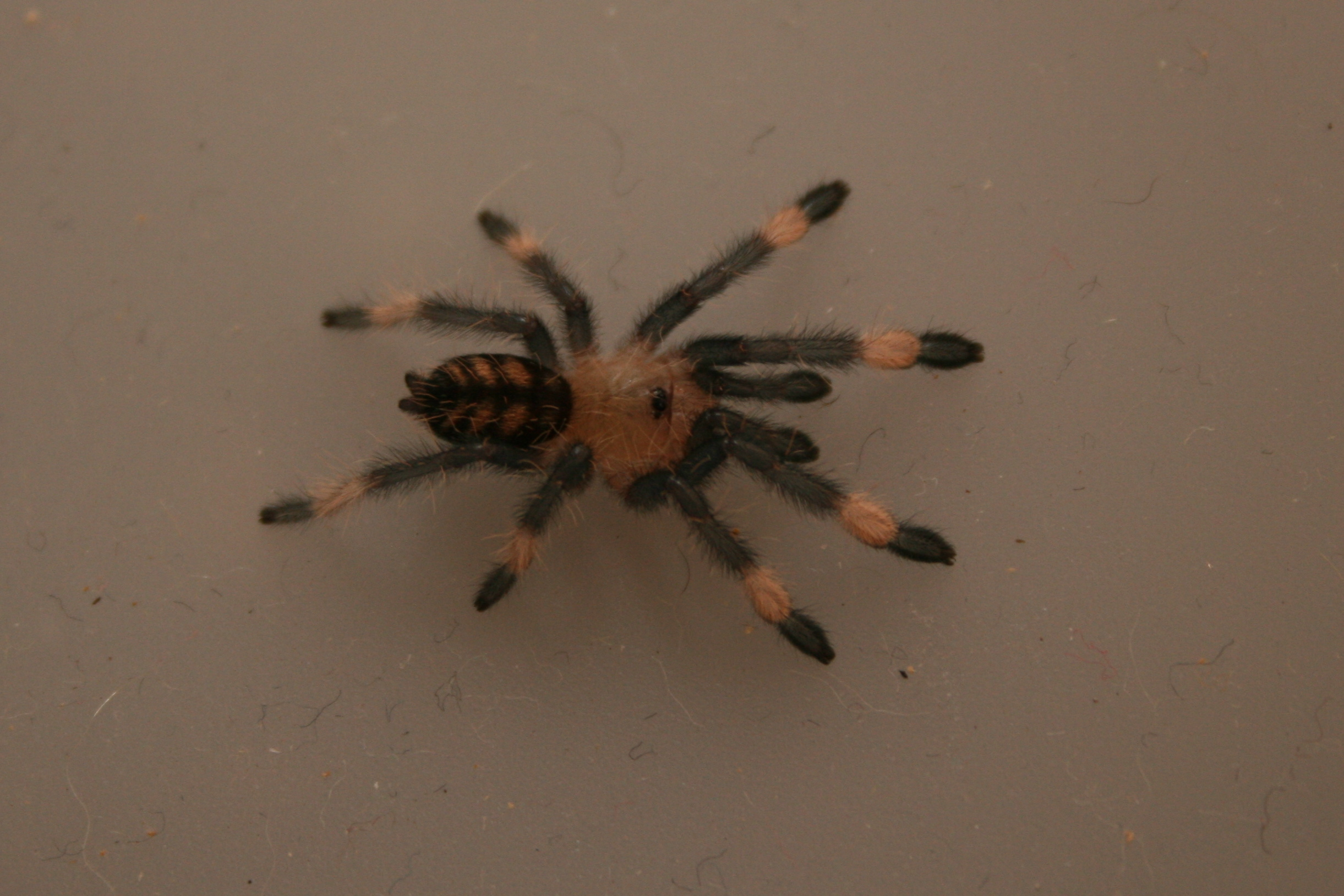
Sling

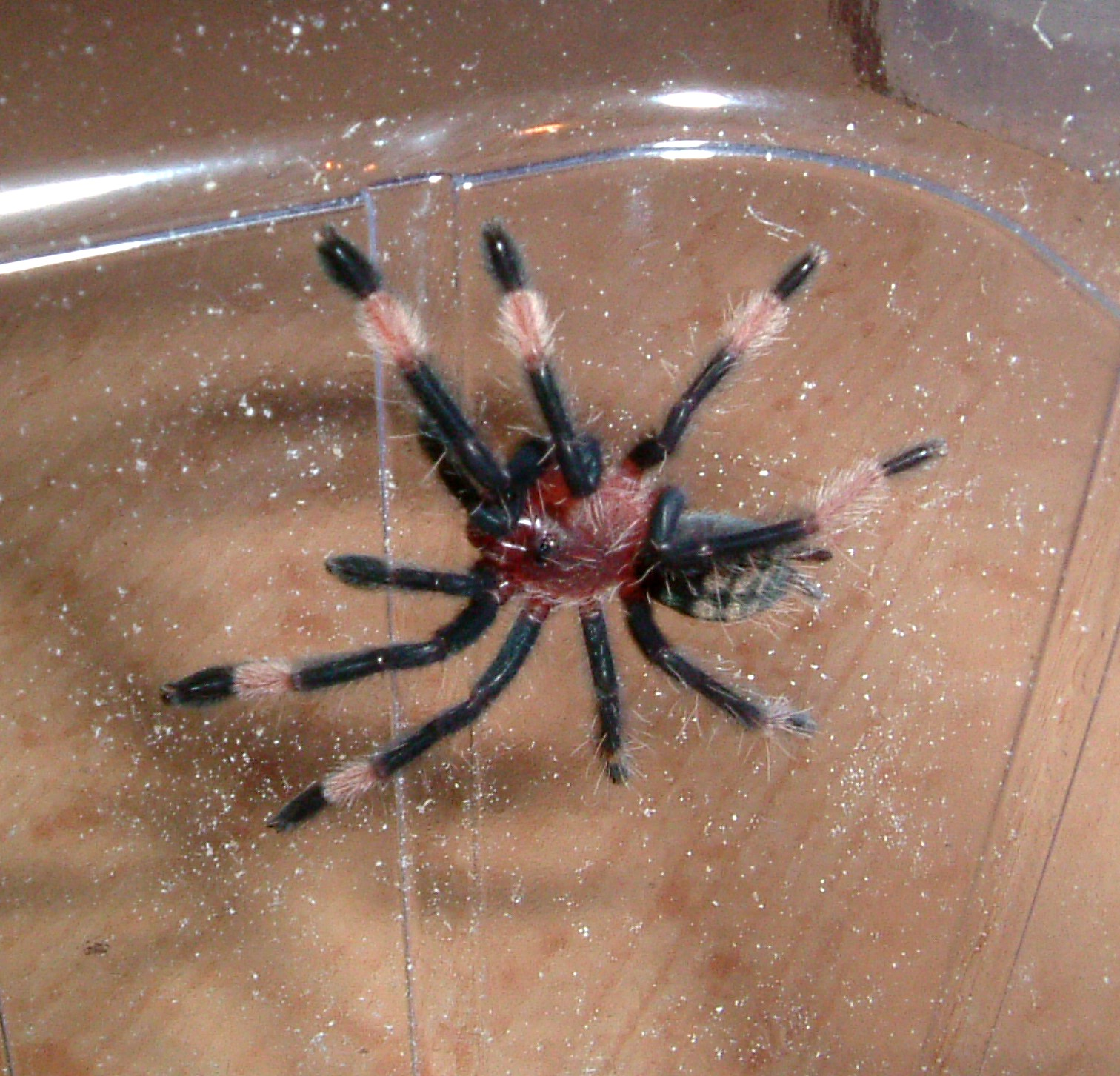

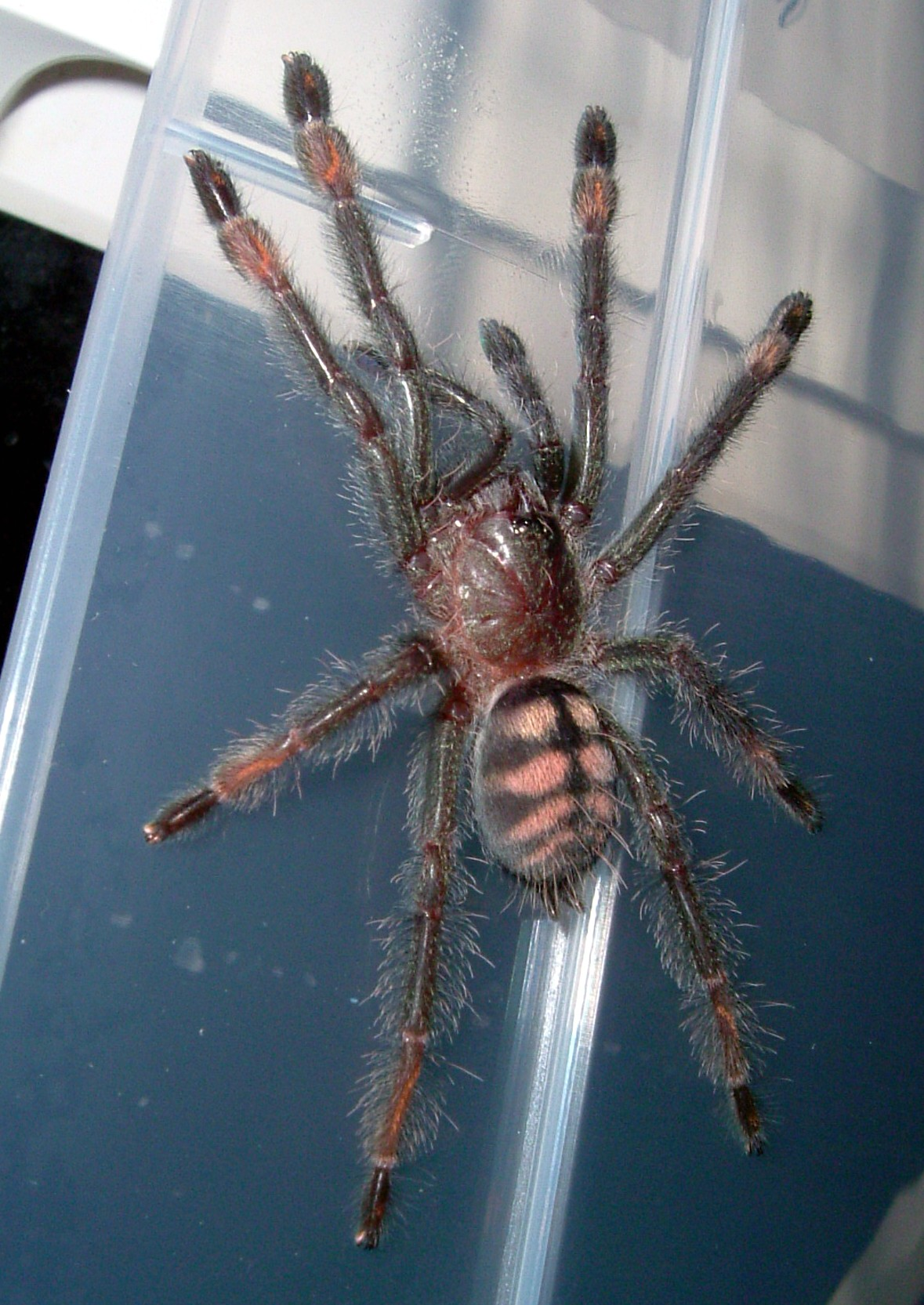
Juvenile

Sexually mature males also have palpal bulbs (copulatory organs) in place of their pedipalp tarsi. Mature males spin sperm webs, specialized webs that hold sperm deposited from the genital opening, from which they can harvest and store the sperm inside the palpal bulb, ready to inseminate a female.

== Etymology ==
The epithet "irminia" was given by Saager in honour of his lifepartner, Irmi Oberhuber.

== Gallery ==
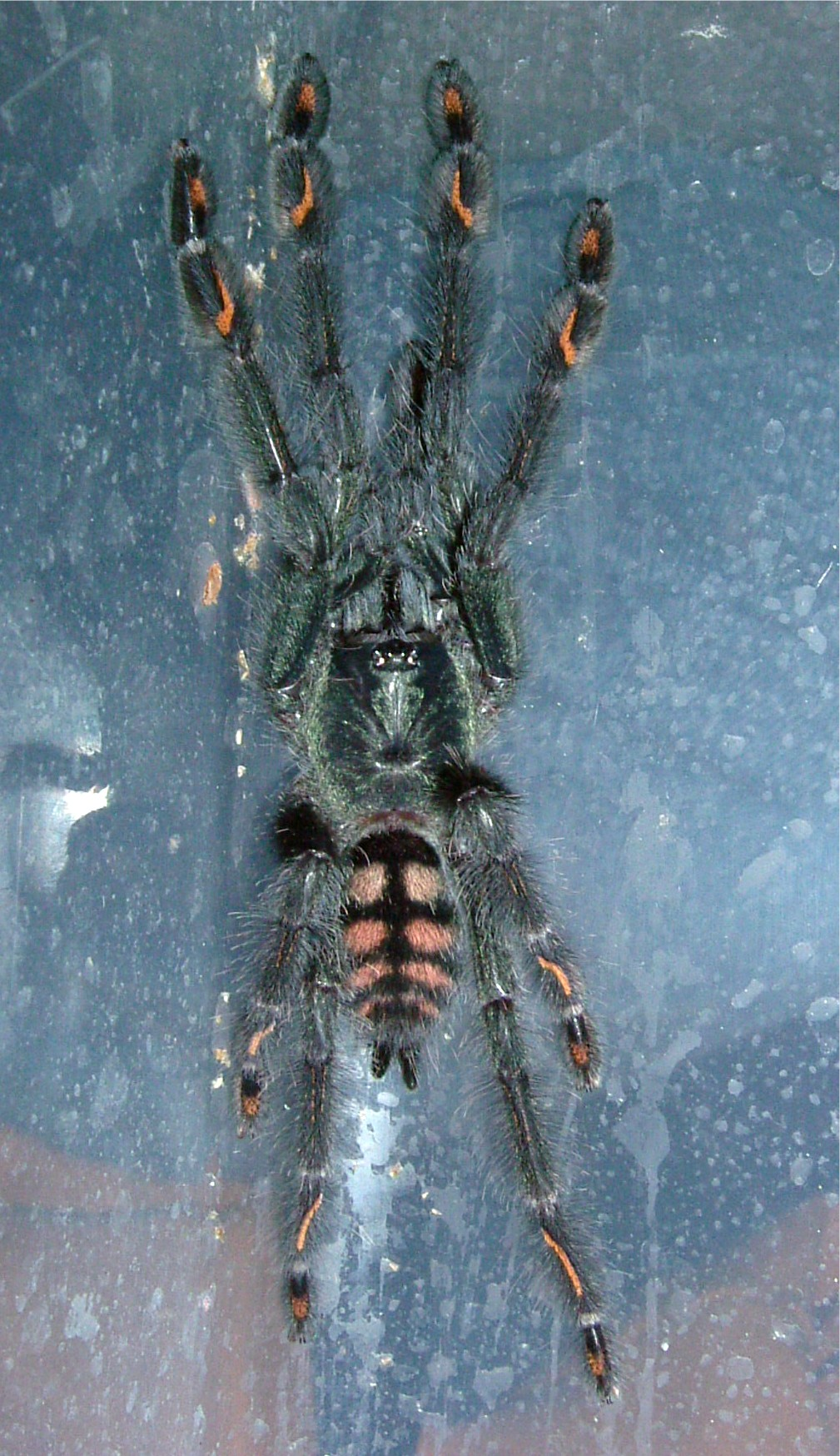
dorsal view

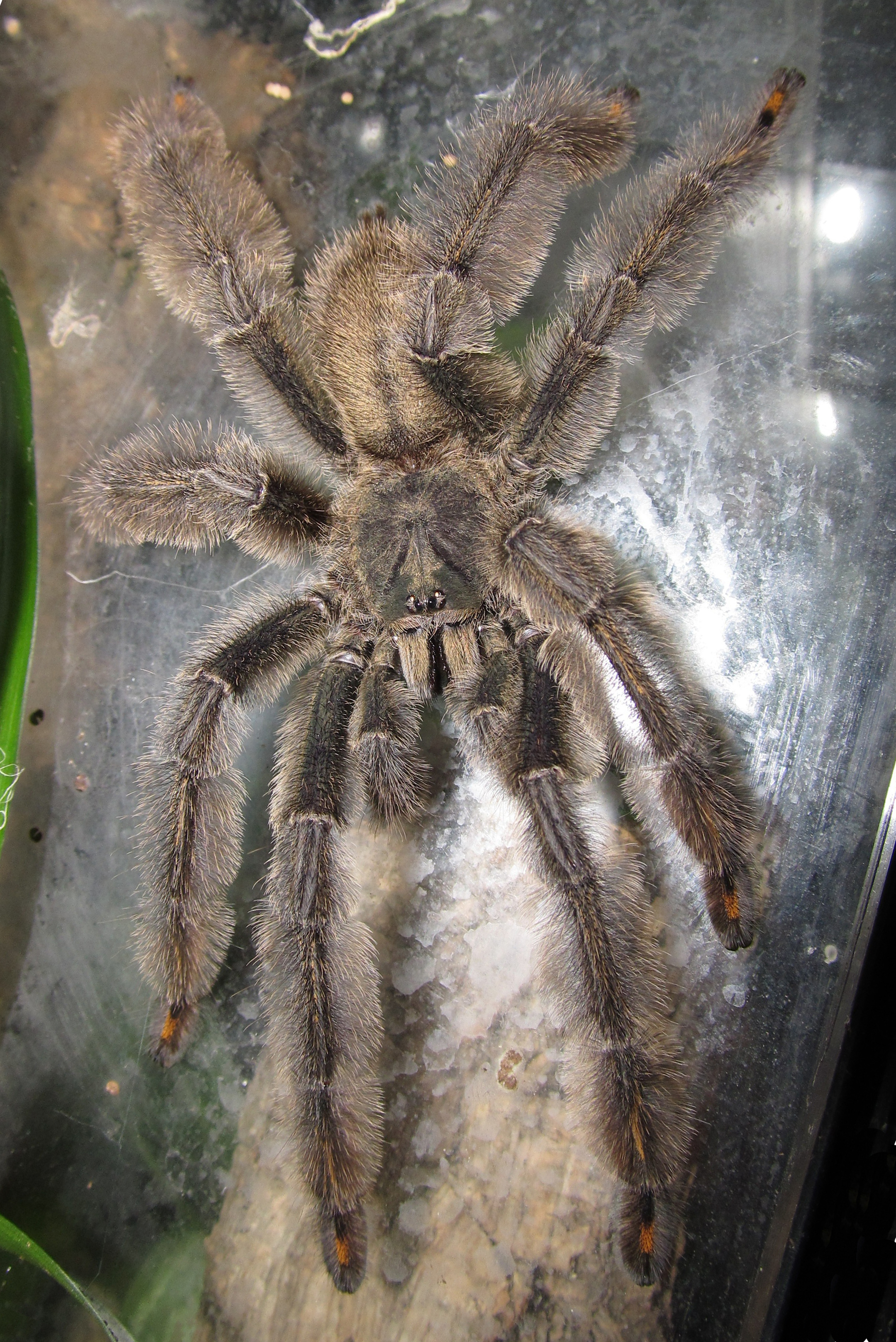
Dorsal view of mature male

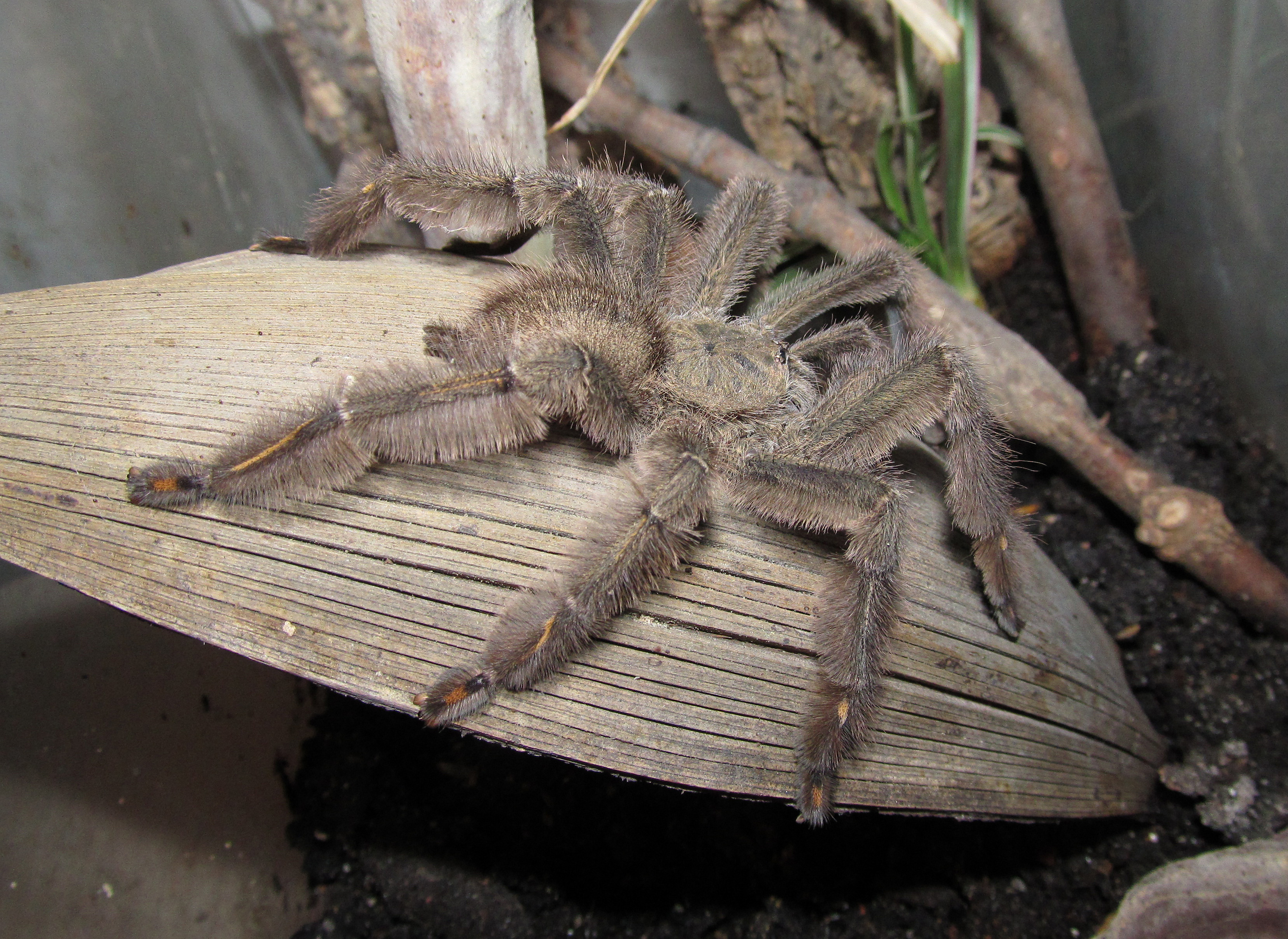
Mature male

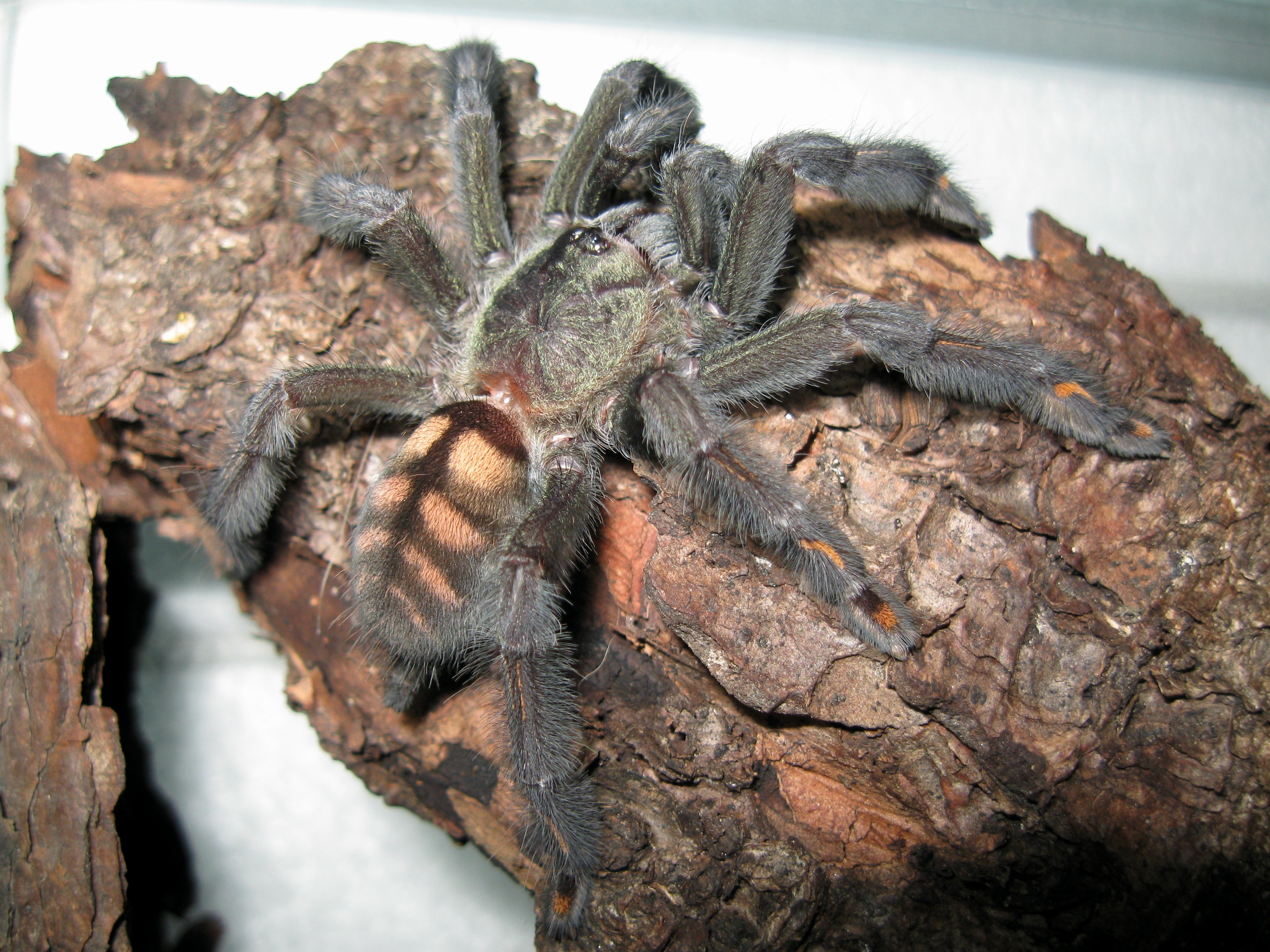
On wood

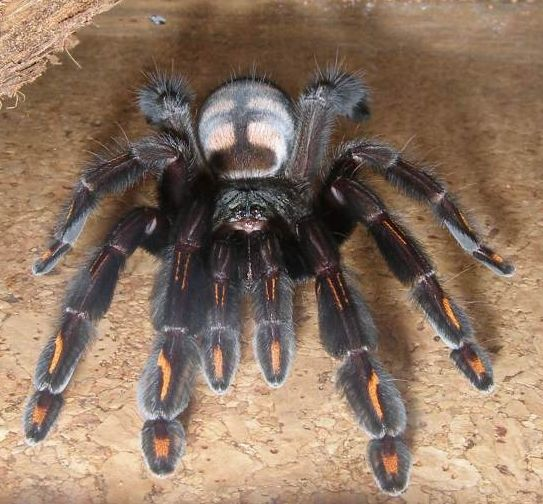
'Front view, showing clear leg markings.

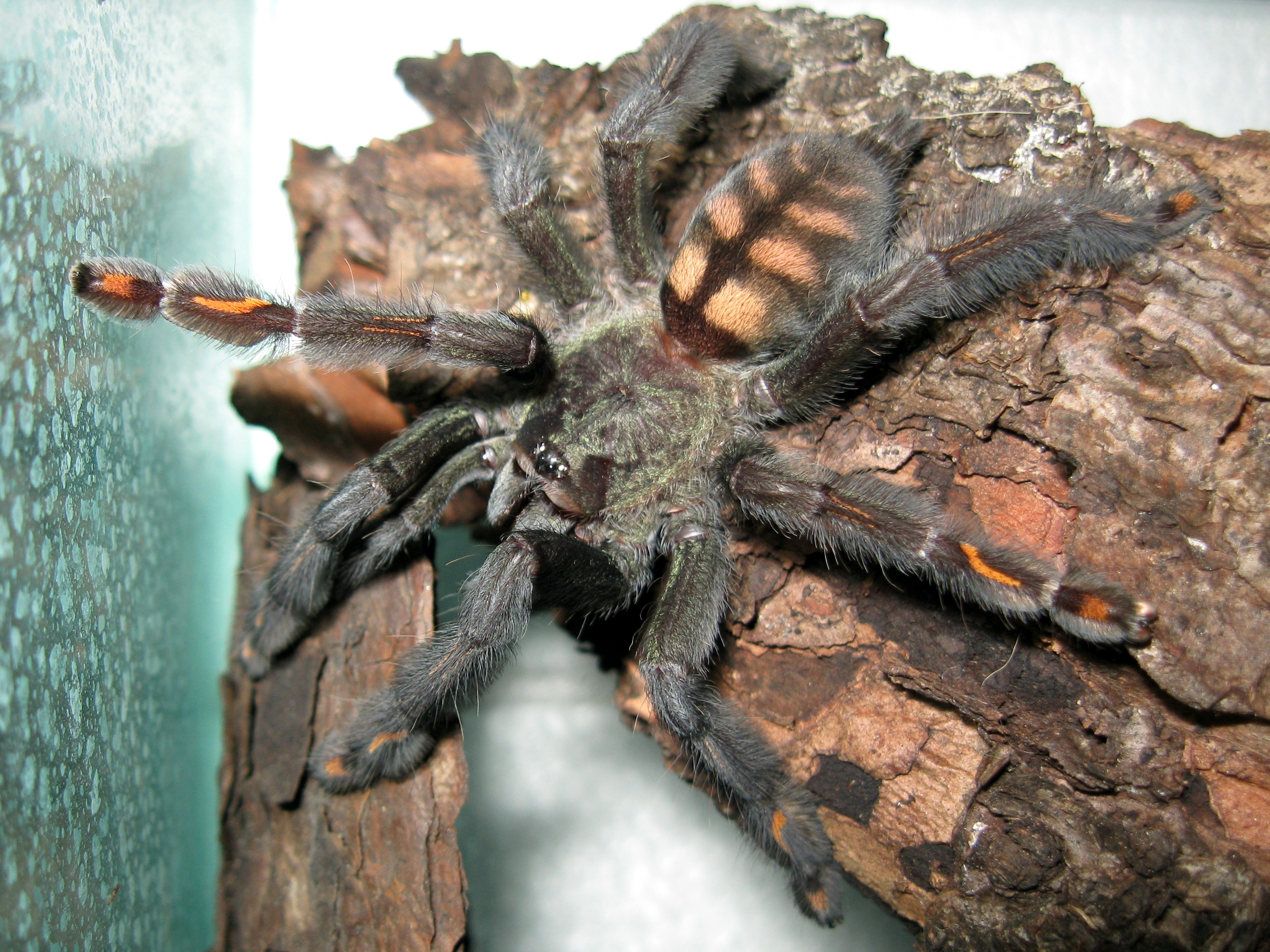
Climbing

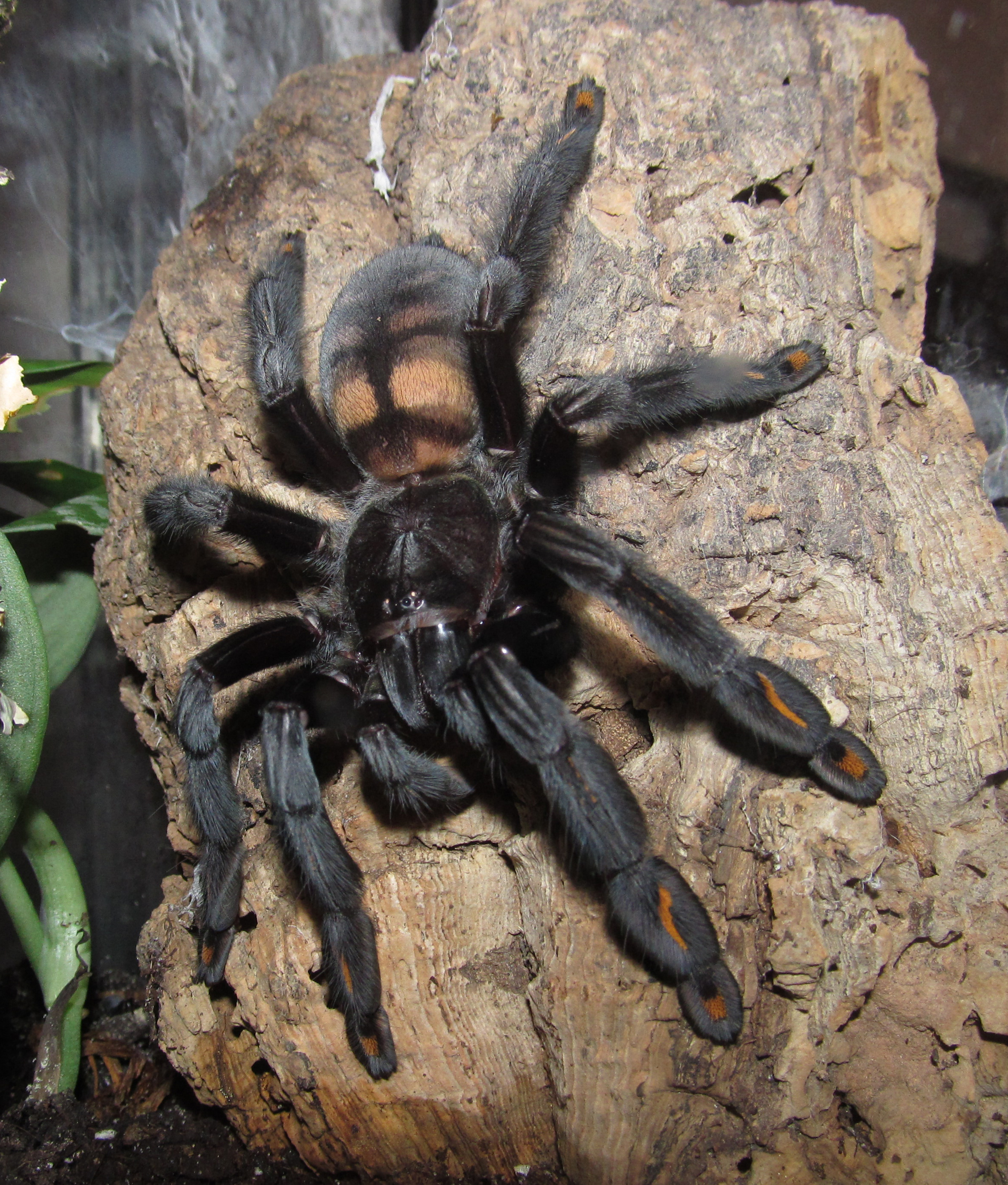

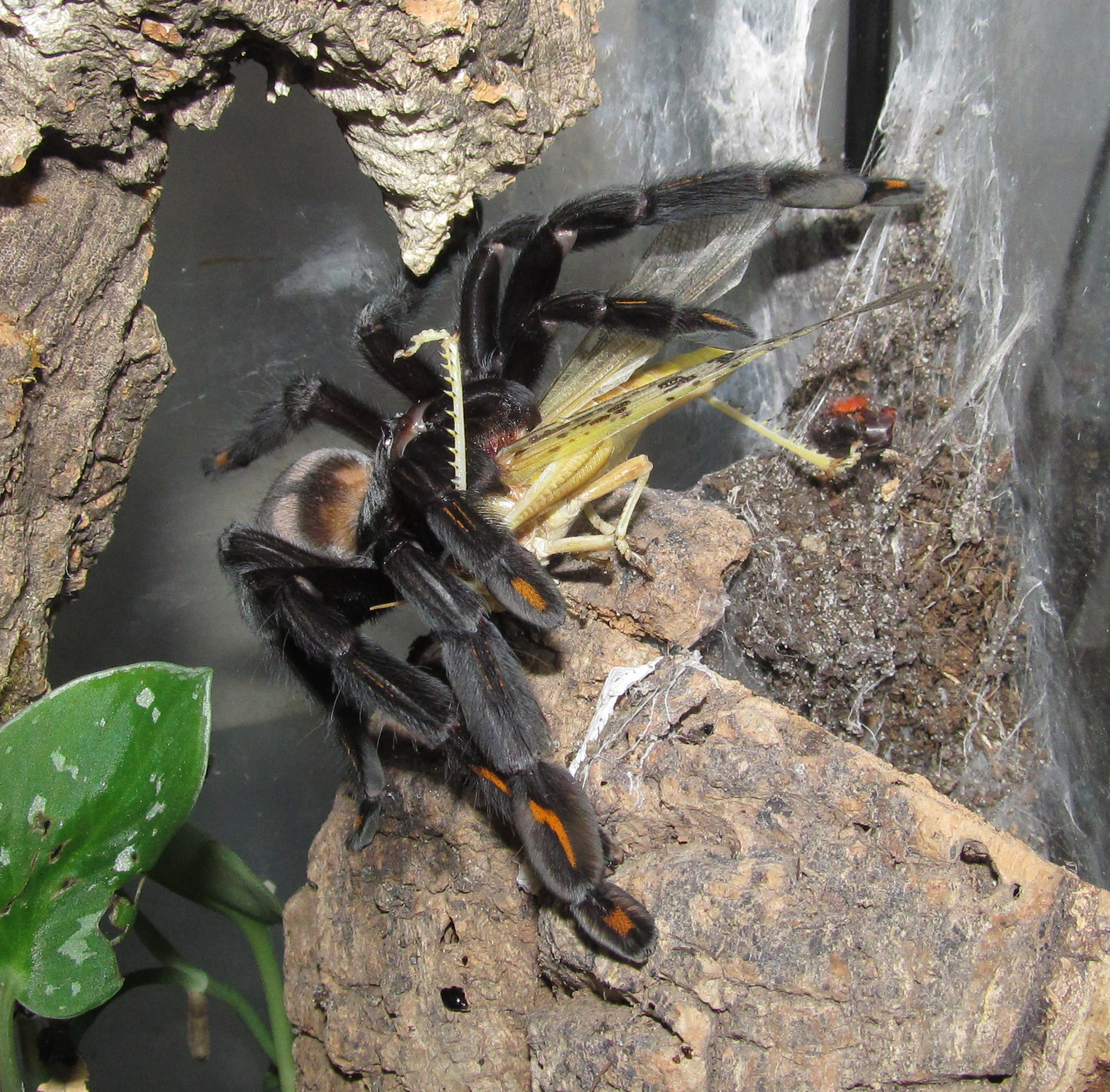
Pet with prey item
