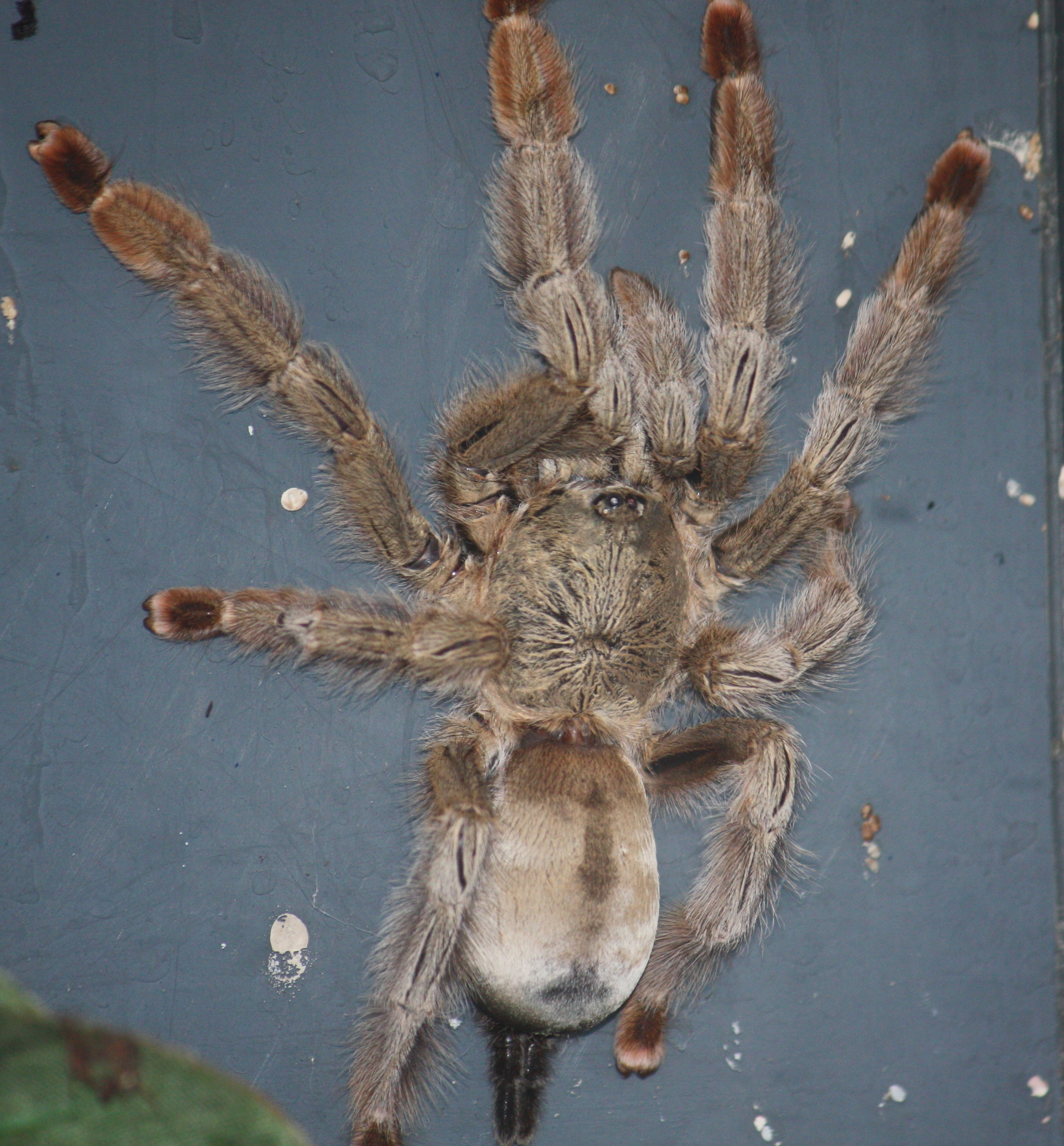
- Female
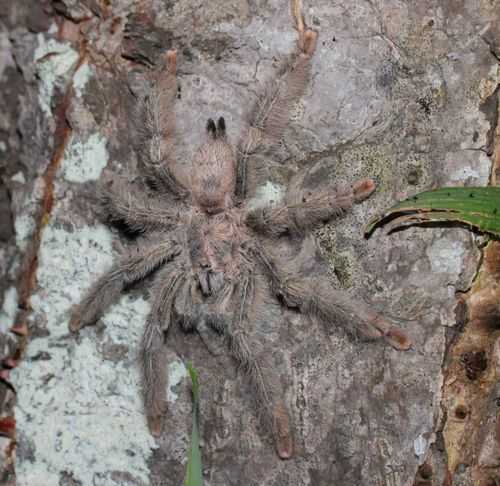
- Mature Male

Scientific classification
- Kingdom: Animalia
- Phylum: Arthropoda
- Subphylum: Chelicerata
- Class: Arachnida
- Order: Araneae
- Infraorder: Mygalomorphae
- Family: Theraphosidae
- Genus: Psalmopoeus
- Species: P. pulcher

Binomial name
- Psalmopoeus pulcher Petrunkevitch, 1925
- Distribution Native range

= Psalmopoeus pulcher =

Species of arachnid

Psalmopoeus pulcher, commonly known as the Panama blonde tarantula, is an arboreal species of tarantula from the genus Psalmopoeus. It can be found in Panama and areas of Colombia.

Along with others in its genus, this species is kept and successfully bred in captivity as an exotic pet.

== Description ==
Psalmopoeus pulcher is predominantly grey or beige in color, with peach tones on its limbs. It has a paler abdomen sporting a dark marking down the center and black spinnerets. The undersides of its feet are iridescent blue-green, potentially aiding in its deimatic display.

Sexually mature males display sexual dimorphism, having long, plumose legs (somewhat resembling pipecleaners) and becoming almost uniform grey or beige in coloration, with black spinnerets, retaining the peach-orange color on its legs.

It lives an arboreal, opportunistic lifestyle, having been found adapting to and residing in manmade environments or populated areas.

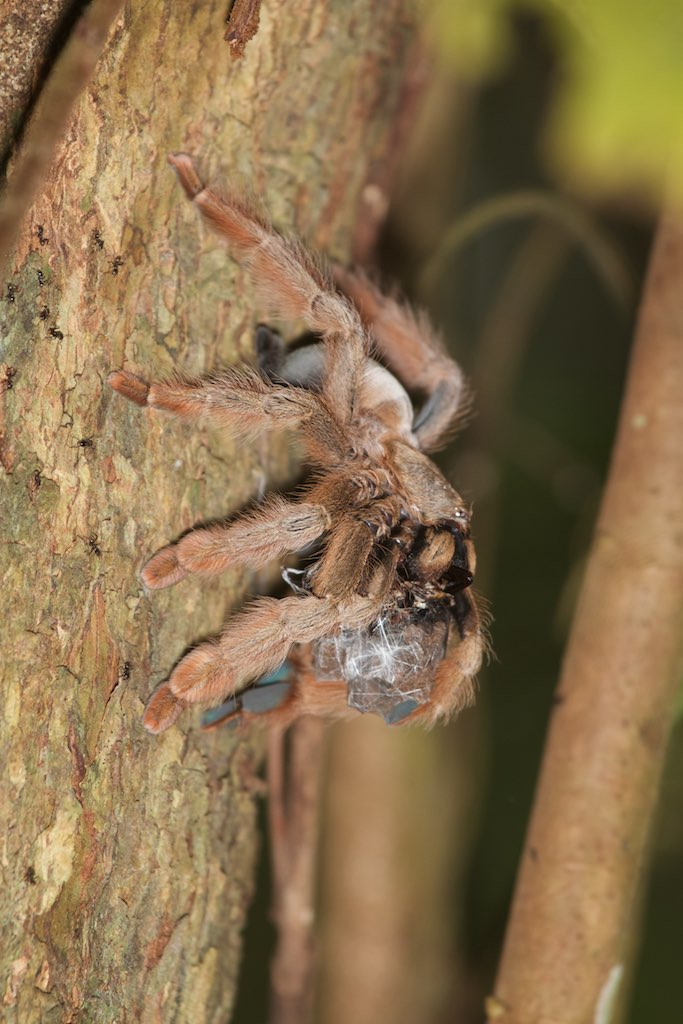
P. pulcher in a tree, carrying detritus

== Taxonomy ==
P. pulcher was first described in 1925 by Alexander Petrunkevitch using a male specimen collected from the (then called) Panama Canal Zone, by Dr. W. J. Baerg. It was observed to have lyra (stridulatory hairs) on its maxillae, a trait characteristic of Psalmopoeus species and unique to them, in the New World.

This species could be a junior synonym of Psalmopoeus plantaris, due to its morphological similarities, but is still considered a valid species due to limited information on the earlier-described P. plantaris. Further collection and study of P. plantaris specimens could synonymise the two as one species in the future.

== Development ==
P. pulcher displays ontogenic color change; change of color as it grows. Spiderlings are almost entirely black, aside from their beige-orange legs with black tarsi. Their abdomen has a dark green sheen. As they grow they gradually lose this dark coloration and transition towards the adult colors.

The subadult is predominantly beige-grey, with reddish leg hairs, but with a much darker abdomen, which fades into adulthood. These developments happen each time it undergoes ecdysis in order to grow.

The sexes are indistinguishable by color, right up until the male undergoes his sexual maturity, where he emerges from ecdysis with palpal bulbs and male coloration. The male also has paired tibial hooks on each foreleg (1st pair of legs), which are concealed by its hair.

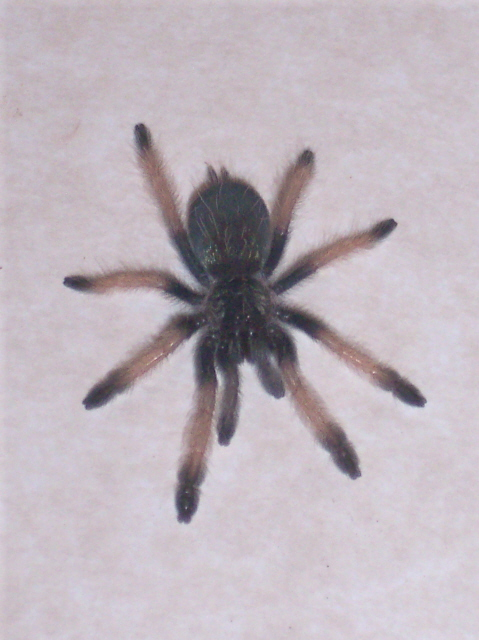
Sling

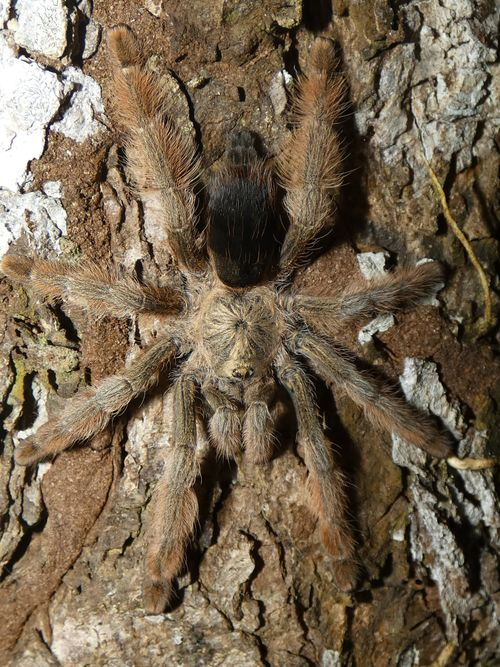
Juvenile

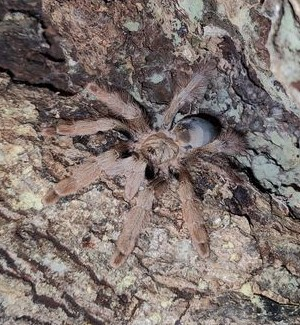
Subadult with abdomen beginning to fade

== Etymology ==
The epithet 'pulcher' is a Latin word meaning "beautiful", "pretty".
