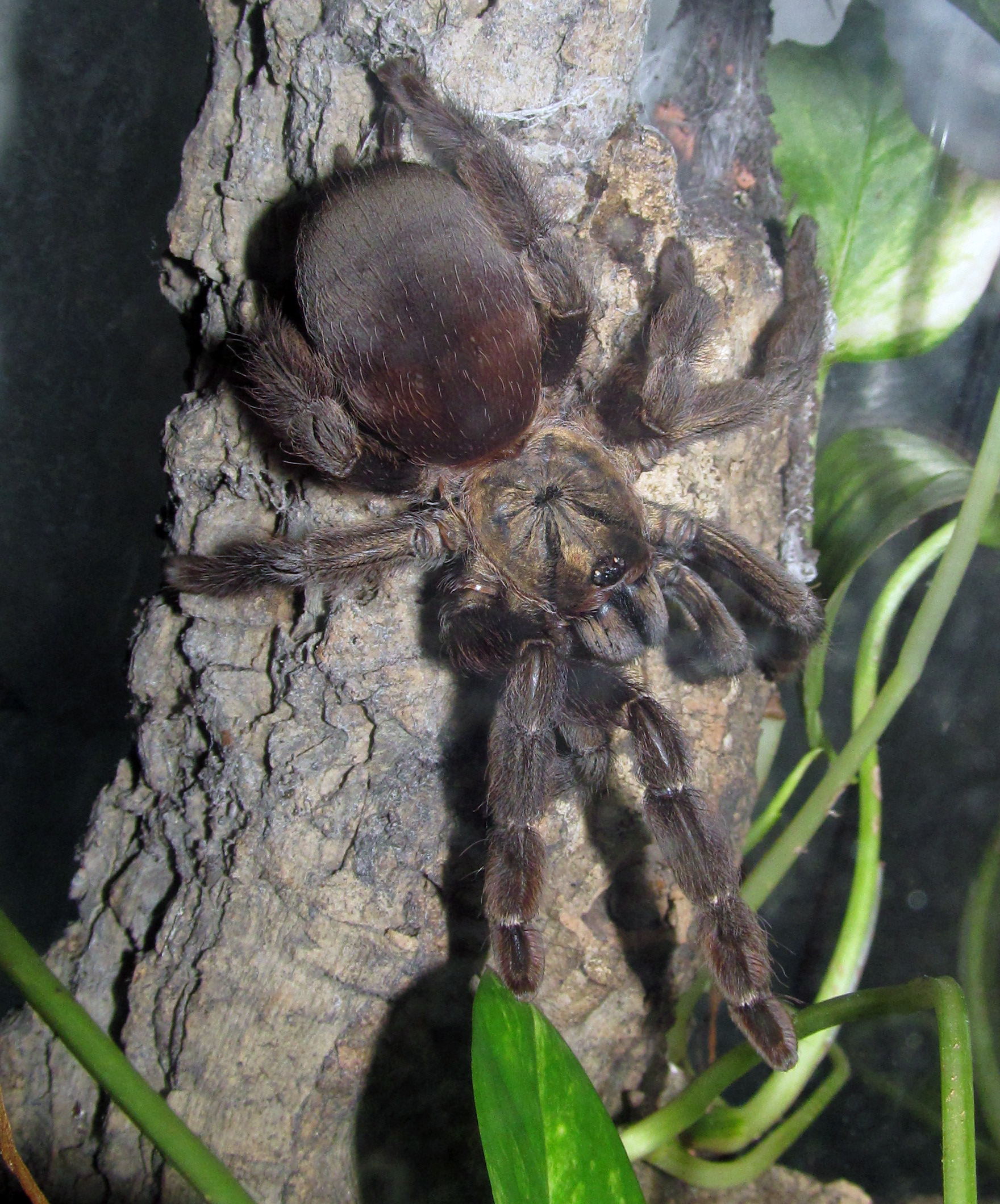
- Psalmopoeus reduncus, female

Scientific classification
- Kingdom: Animalia
- Phylum: Arthropoda
- Subphylum: Chelicerata
- Class: Arachnida
- Order: Araneae
- Infraorder: Mygalomorphae
- Family: Theraphosidae
- Genus: Psalmopoeus
- Species: P. reduncus

Binomial name
- Psalmopoeus reduncus Karsch, 1880

= Psalmopoeus reduncus =

Species of tarantula

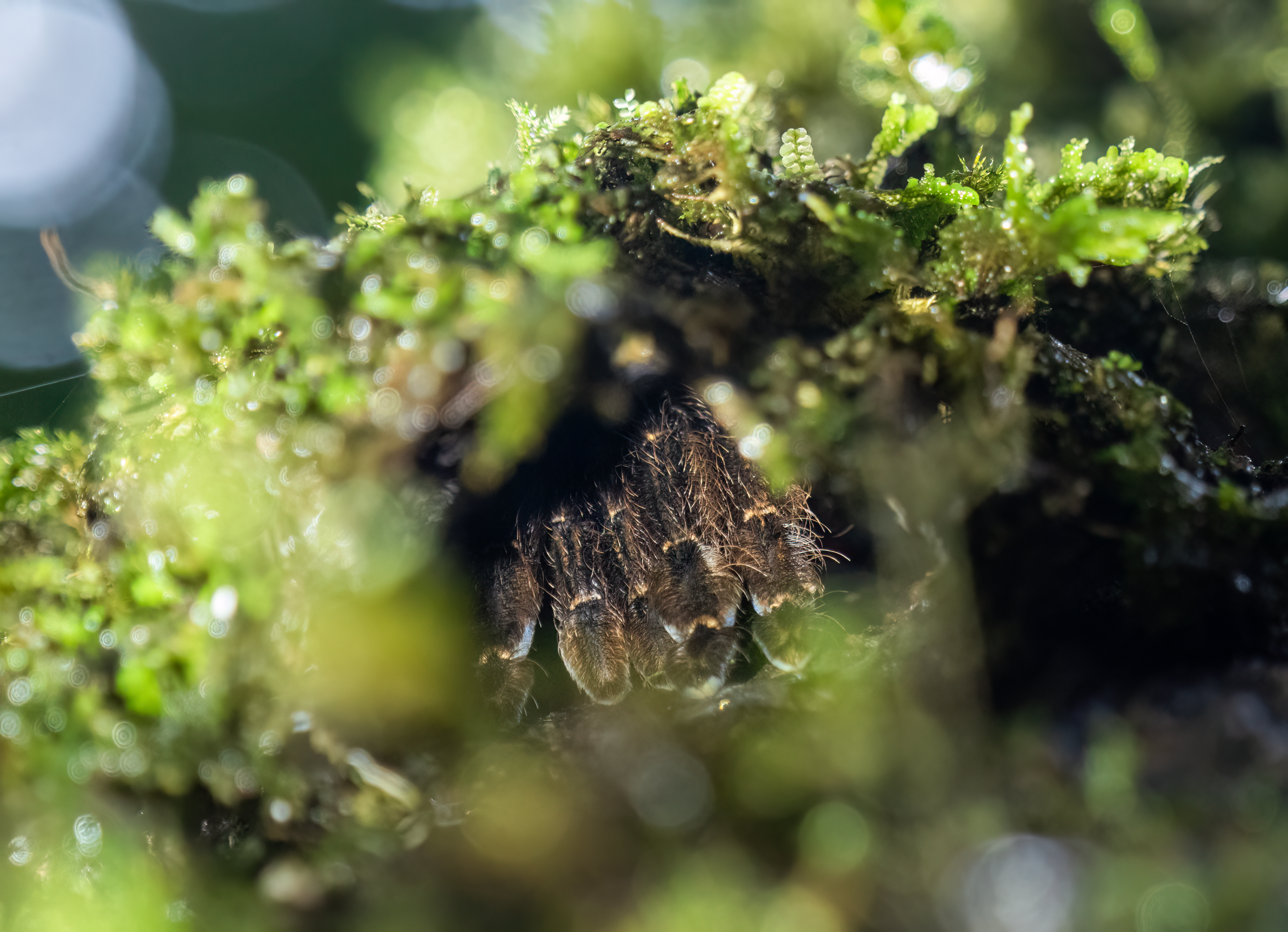
P. reduncus hiding during the day

Psalmopoeus reduncus also known as the Costa Rican orange mouth tarantula, as its common name implies it is found in Costa Rica, Panama and Nicaragua. It was first described by Karsch in 1880, its common name is derived from the fact they have orange hairs around the chelicerae.

== Description ==
Females are able to live to up to 12 years, while males only up to 3. They can also grow to up to 15cm, their body is a chestnut brown color, although they may develop chevrons on the abdomen. Although juveniles may have more of a golden to copper colored abdomen. They also lack urticating hairs, as others in the Psalmopoeus genus.

== Behavior ==
They are an arboreal species, it is a fast moving spider, running rather than being defensive. It is also a fairly reclusive tarantula, staying in its hide for most of the day.
