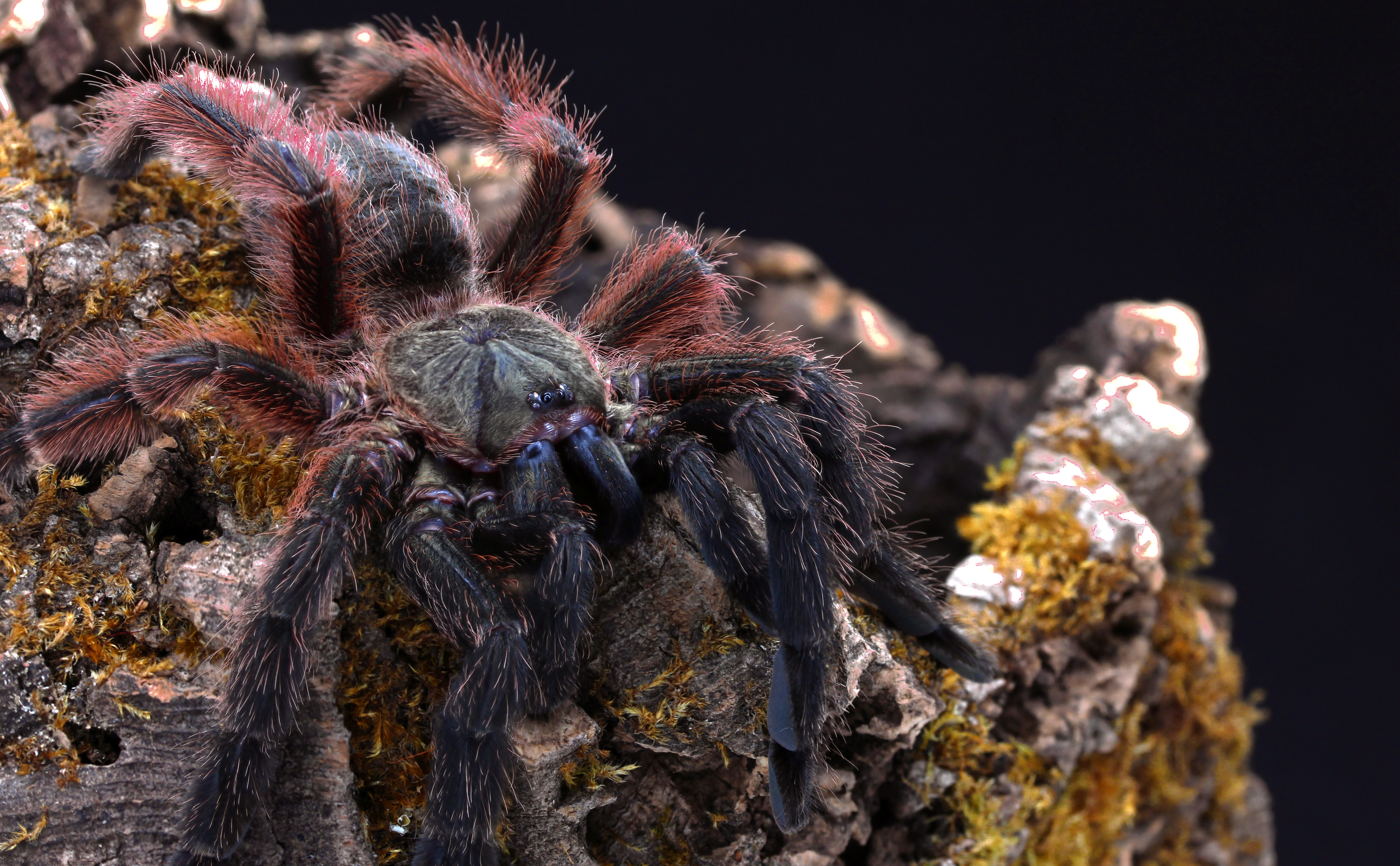
- Mature female - Quentin Salinas

Scientific classification
- Kingdom: Animalia
- Phylum: Arthropoda
- Subphylum: Chelicerata
- Class: Arachnida
- Order: Araneae
- Infraorder: Mygalomorphae
- Family: Theraphosidae
- Genus: Psalmopoeus
- Species: P. victori

Binomial name
- Psalmopoeus victori Mendoza, 2014

= Psalmopoeus victori =

Species of spider

Psalmopoeus victori, the Mexican half & half or Darth Maul tarantula, is a species of tarantula endemic to the moist forests of Veracruz, Mexico, although the exact location is withheld to protect the spiders from illegal collection.

== Description ==
This species is easily distinguished from other members of the genus Psalmopoeus by its unique coloration, that is having vibrant red on the backside (abdomen and legs III & IV) and dark coloration on the front legs, along with a green carapace. Females reach roughly 6.5 inches by diagonal leg span. P. victori is sexually dimorphic, with males appearing much more slender, legs matching the green coloration of the carapace, and red abdomen. Like other species in the genus Psalmopoeus, the species lacks urticating hairs. This species is extremely reclusive, when searching at night, the time tarantulas are most active, it can still prove difficult to observe any specimen. When they are found, it is usually in tree cavities at a medium height.

== Etymology ==
The specific name is a patronym in honor of Víctor H. Jiménez Arcos, a Mexican herpetologist who saw and collected the first specimen of the species.
