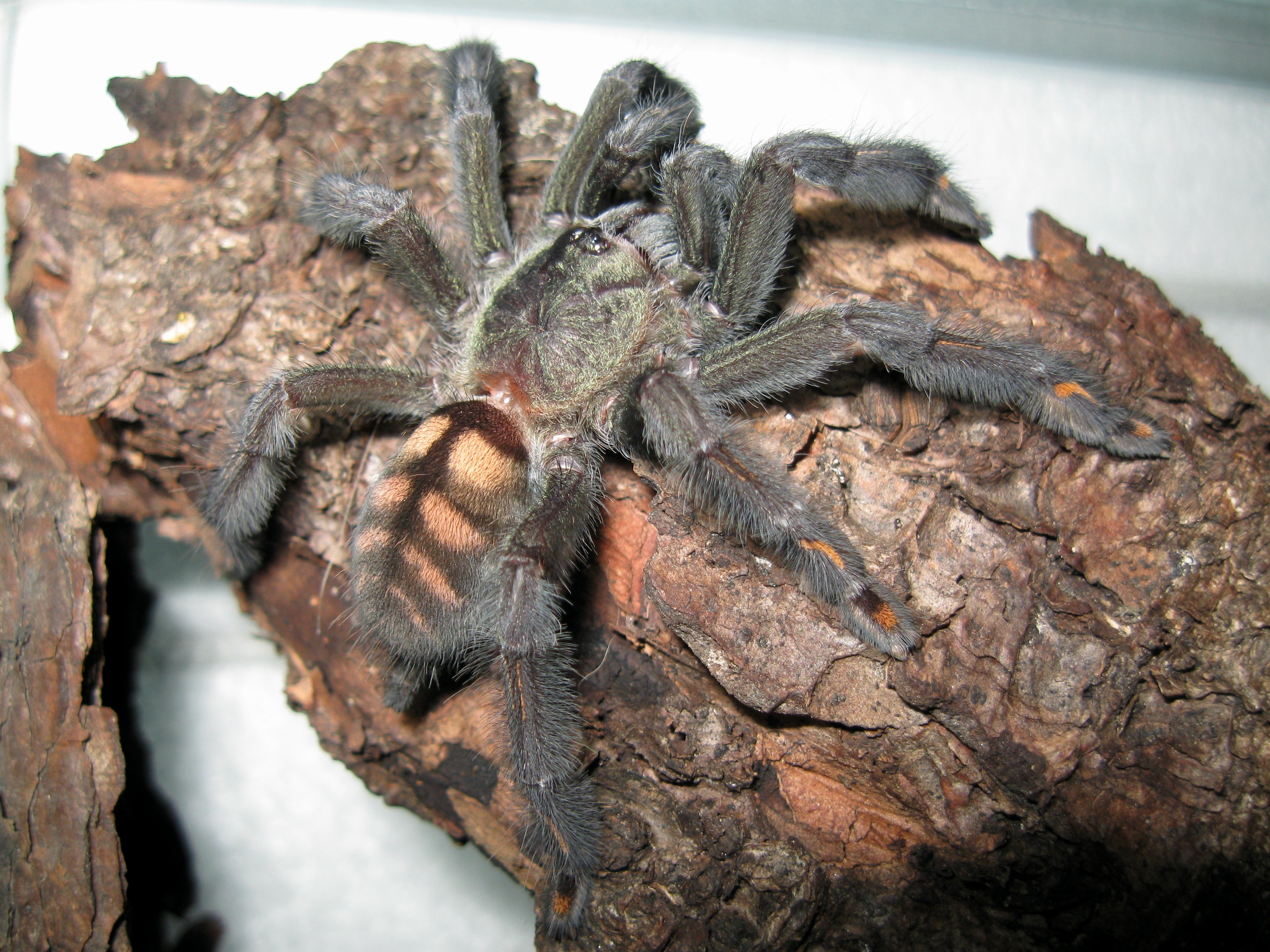
- Psalmopoeus irminia (female)

Scientific classification
- Kingdom: Animalia
- Phylum: Arthropoda
- Subphylum: Chelicerata
- Class: Arachnida
- Order: Araneae
- Infraorder: Mygalomorphae
- Family: Theraphosidae
- Genus: Psalmopoeus; Pocock, 1895

Type species
- Psalmopoeus cambridgei Pocock, 1895

Species
- 20, see text

= Psalmopoeus =

Genus of spiders

Psalmopoeus is a genus of the family Theraphosidae containing various species of tarantulas. The genus is native to South America, Central America, Trinidad and Tobago, and Mexico.

All of these tarantulas are arboreal in nature, Psalmopoeus victori being the first arboreal tarantula of Mexico.

== Diagnosis ==
The species of this genus can be distinguished from all others of the New World by lyra (stridulatory hairs) on the prolateral maxillae, composed of a singular row of chitinous hairlike rods. They also own hairs on the base of the chelicerae, also having short hairs in the retrolateral side of the pedipalp trochanter and femur.

== Venom ==
These species are believed to be relatively venomous, and research in the venom of P. cambridgei shows it to target the same nociceptor as capsaicin, the molecule causing irritation in chilli peppers. These molecules activate sensory cells to send pain signals to the brain. Genetic engineers are working on blocking the receptors that are activated by these molecules.

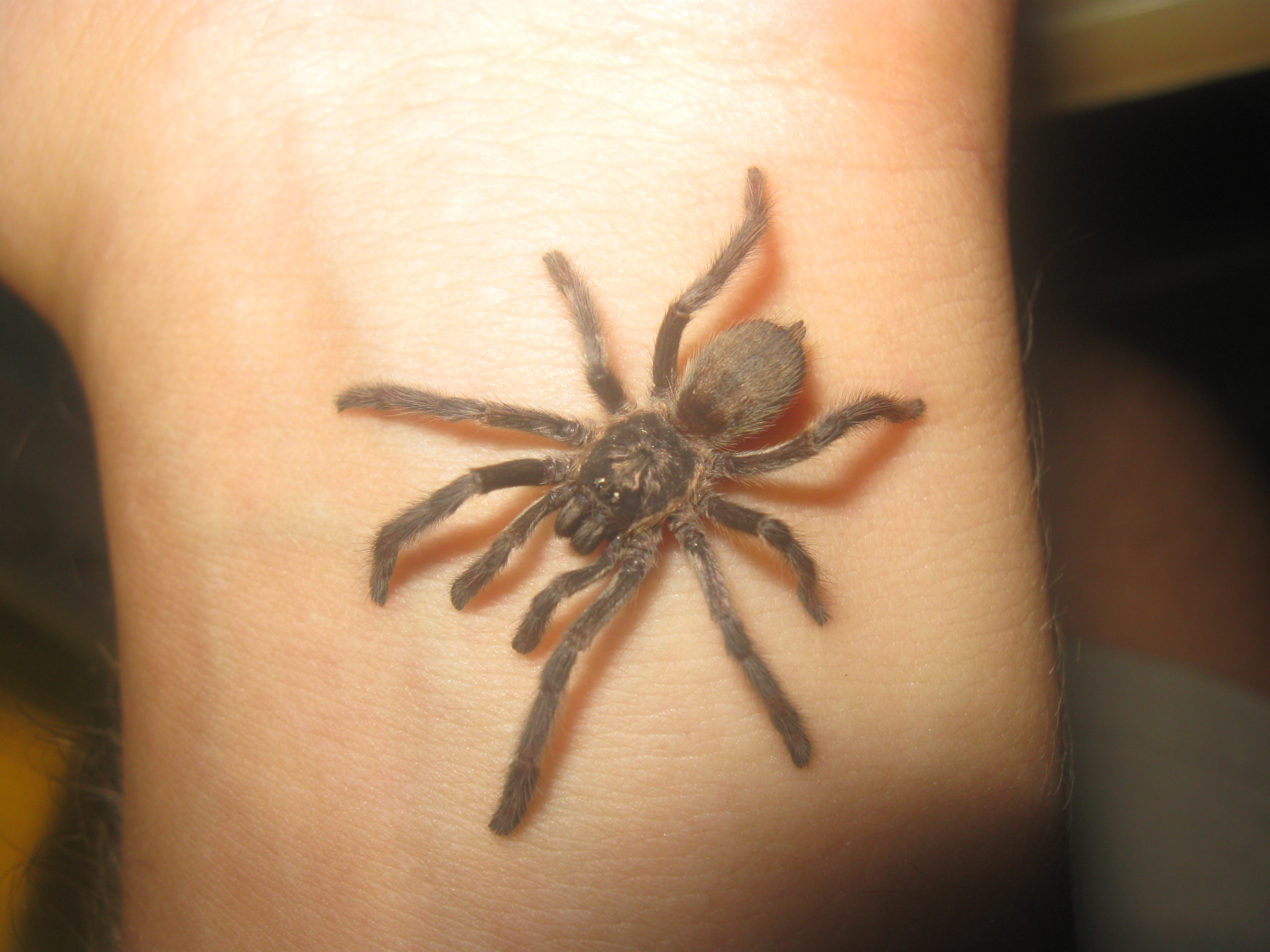
P. langenbucher

== List of species ==
As of March 2026, the World Spider Catalog accepted the following species:

- Psalmopoeus cambridgei Pocock, 1895 (type species) – Trinidad and Tobago
- Psalmopoeus chronoarachne Peñaherrera-R. & León-E., 2023 - Ecuador
- Psalmopoeus copanensis Gabriel & Sherwood, 2020 - Honduras
- Psalmopoeus drolshageni Sherwood, Gabriel, Peñaherrera-R., Guerrero-Campoverde, León-E., Falcón-Reibán, Fajardo-Torres, Picón-Rentería & Cisneros-Heredia, 2025 - Costa Rica
- Psalmopoeus ecclesiasticus Pocock, 1903 – Colombia and Ecuador
- Psalmopoeus intermedius Chamberlin, 1940 - Panama
- Psalmopoeus irminia Saager, 1994 – Venezuela, Guyana and Brazil
- Psalmopoeus langenbucheri Schmidt, Bullmer & Thierer-Lutz, 2006 – Venezuela
- Psalmopoeus petenensis Gabriel & Sherwood, 2020 - Guatemala
- Psalmopoeus pristirana Dupérré & Tapia, 2024 - Ecuador
- Psalmopoeus pulcher Petrunkevitch, 1925 – Panama and Colombia
- Psalmopoeus reduncus Karsch, 1880 – Nicaragua, Costa Rica and Panama
- Psalmopoeus sandersoni Gabriel & Sherwood, 2020 - Belize
- Psalmopoeus satanas Peñaherrera-R. & León-E., 2023 - Ecuador
- Psalmopoeus victori Mendoza, 2014 – Mexico
- Psalmopoeus wallacea Sherwood, Gabriel, Peñaherrera-R., Guerrero-Campoverde, León-E., Falcón-Reibán, Fajardo-Torres, Picón-Rentería & Cisneros-Heredia, 2025 - Honduras
- Psalmopoeus zombie Sherwood, Peñaherrera-R., Gabriel, Guerrero-Campoverde, León-E., Falcón-Reibán, Fajardo-Torres, Picón-Rentería & Cisneros-Heredia, 2025 - Colombia

=== Species inquirenda ===
- Psalmopoeus emeraldus Pocock, 1903 – Colombia
- Psalmopoeus maya Witt, 1996 - Belize
- Psalmopoeus plantaris Pocock, 1903 – Colombia

=== In synonymy ===
- Psalmopoeus longipes F. O. Pickard-Cambridge, 1896 = Psalmopoeus cambridgei
- Psalmopoeus rufus Petrunkevitch, 1925 = Psalmopoeus pulcher

==== Nomen dubium ====
- Psalmopoeus affinis Strand, 1907 - West Indies
