= AaTX1 =

Scorpion toxin

AaTX1 is a scorpion toxin of the α-KTx15 subfamily originally found in the venom of Androctonus australis. The toxin acts as a specific blocker on Kv4.3 voltage-gated potassium channel, thereby abolishing the A-type potassium currents.

AaTX1
Superfamily	Short Scorpion Toxins
Family	Scorpion Toxins
Subfamily	α-KTx15
Amino acid sequence	ZIETNKKCQGGSCASVCKKVIGVAAGKCINGRCVCYP
Molecular weight	3851 Da

== Etymology and source ==
AaTX1 is a peptide that can be purified from the venom of Androctonus australis. Androctonus australis is a fat-tailed desert scorpion distributed over North Africa and the Middle East. AaTX1 represents only 0.007% (w/v) of Androctonus australis venom.

== Chemistry ==
The peptide consists of 37 amino acid residues, which include six cysteines. These cysteines form disulfide bridges, cross-linking the residues along the peptidyl chain. The determined molecular mass of the peptide appears to be approximately 3851 Da. AaTX1 is a member of the α-KTx15 subfamily (α-KTx15-4). This family consists of six peptides, which share high level of sequence similarity: Aa1, AaTX1, AaTX2, AmmTX3, BmTX3 and Discrepin. More specifically, AaTX1 shares the highest percentage of sequence identity (97%) with AmmTX3, differing in only one conserved amino acid (R in AmmTX3/K in AaTX1) in position 19.

The 3D structure of AaTX1 has been solved. The toxin appears to have the characteristic folding of K^{+} channel scorpion toxins, consisting of a double-stranded antiparallel β-sheet and an α-helix. Furthermore, AaTX1 contains the amino acid dyad (K27, Y36) typically found in pore-blocking potassium channel-specific toxins.

== Target ==
AaTX1 is a specific pore-blocker of Kv4.3 potassium channels neurons, with the β-sheet of the peptide interacting with the residues of the channel selectivity filter. The electrostatic interaction between the toxin and the Kv4.3 potassium channel is subserved by a specific residue (pGlu1), which is entrapped between two positively charged residues of the channel. The substitution of K19 in AaTX1 by R19 in AmmTX3 is located far from the interaction surface with the Kv4.3 potassium channel, therefore the interaction appears to be identical for both toxins.

== Mode of action ==
By acting as a specific pore-blocker of Kv4.3 potassium channels, AaTX1 inhibits the I_{A} current through these channels. As a result, at a concentration of 250 nM, AaTX1 decreases the I_{A} current amplitude by 90% in the dopaminergic neurons of the substantia nigra. I_{A} currents, mediated by these specific channels, may make an important contribution to the repolarization phase of the action potential.
