= AmmTX3 =

Scorpion toxin

- Superfamily: Short scorpion toxins
- Family: Scorpion toxins
- Subfamily: α-KTX15
- Amino acid: ZIETNKKCQGGSCASVCRKVIGVAAGKCINGRCVCYP
- Molecular weight: 3823.5 Da

AmmTX3, produced by Androctonus mauretanicus, is a scorpion toxin of the α-KTX15 subfamily. The toxin is known for its ability to act as a specific Kv4 channel blocker, and thereby reducing the A-type potassium current through this channel.

== Etymology and source ==
AmmTX3 (α-KTX15.3) is a peptide that can be isolated from the venom of Androctonus mauretanicus. Androctonus mauretanicus is a fat-tailed scorpion with its origins in North Africa.

== Chemistry ==
AmmTX3 has a molecular mass of 3823.5 Da and consists of a single chain of 37 amino acid residues. These residues are cross-linked by three disulfide bridges. The toxin contains the dyad characteristic (K27 and Y36) that is found in pore-blocking potassium channel-specific toxins, and is therefore likely to act as a pore blocker.

AmmTX3 is a member of the α-KTX15 subfamily. This subfamily currently exists of six very homologous peptides, originating from scorpion venom: Aa1, AaTX1, AaTX2, AmmTX3, BmTx3 and Discrepin. Toxins of the α-KTX15 subfamily all seem to have an effect on the A-type potassium current.

== Target ==
AmmTX3 is a specific pore blocker of Kv4.2 and Kv4.3 channels of mice. This high-affinity blockade depends on the expression of dipeptidyl peptidase-like proteins (DPP) DPP6 and DPP10, which are proteins that co-assemble with the alpha-subunits of Kv4 channels. Besides its potent ability to block Kv4 channel, AmmTx3 also has a small blocking effect on hERG channels without alteration of the gating kinetics.

== Mode of action ==
By blocking specifically the Kv4 channels, AmmTX3 reduces the A-type potassium current through these channels almost completely. A-type potassium currents can be generated by Kv1.4, Kv3.3, Kv3.4, all members of Kv4 and Erg3 channels. The influence of AmmTX3 on the overall A-type potassium currents hence depends on the specific channel types that mediate this current in the cell. For example, in the solitary nucleus, the A-type potassium current is Kv4-mediated. Therefore, presence of AmmTX3 in the solitary nucleus cells blocks the A-type potassium current almost completely. Similar effects have been found in the hippocampus, substantia nigra, and cerebellum granule cells of rats and mice.

While AmmTX3 nearly completely blocks the transient component of the A-type potassium current in cerebellar granular neurons at 0.5 μM, the sustained component of the current, which is thought to be Kv3.1 mediated, seems unaffected, in contrast to Aa1 and BmTX3.

AmmTX3 is predominantly used in research setting, where it is often injected into specific brain areas to learn more about the role of Kv4 channels in those areas. For example, AmmTX3 possibly impairs the consolidation of spatial information and learning strategy through Kv4 channel inhibition, as found within rats in a radial-maze task. AmmTX3 also increases spontaneous pacemaking frequency in substantia nigra pars compacta dopaminergic neurons

== Toxicity ==
The Ki of AmmTX3 was found to be approximately 131 nM when tested on striatal neurons in cell culture. AmmTX3 has a small blocking effect on hERG channels with an IC50 of 7.9 ± 1.4 μM.
