= Androctonus maroccanus =

Scientific classification
- Kingdom: Animalia
- Phylum: Arthropoda
- Subphylum: Chelicerata
- Class: Arachnida
- Order: Scorpiones
- Family: Buthidae
- Genus: Androctonus
- Species: A. maroccanus

Binomial name
- Androctonus maroccanus Lourenço, Ythier & Leguin, 2009

Type strain
- MNHN-RS-8750 (male, holotype) MNHN-RS-8751 (female, paratype)
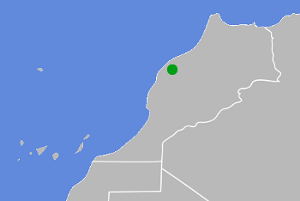
- Range of A. maroccanus

Species of scorpion

Androctonus maroccanus is a species of scorpion of the family Buthidae. Along with other members of the genus Androctonus it is also known by the collective vernacular name fat-tailed scorpion. A. maroccanus is endemic to the Atlantic coast of central Morocco.

== Taxonomy ==
The species was described in 2009 by Wilson R. Lourenço, Eric Ythier and Elise-Anne Leguin. The type specimens were collected by F. Principaud in September 2009. It was named after its country of origin.

== Description ==
Adult specimens reach a considerable size of about 70 mm. The overall color is uniformly yellow to yellow-reddish with darker carinae on the metasoma. The scorpion shows the typical characteristics of the genus Androctonus including slender pedipalp chelae and a thick, robust metasoma with a proportionally large vesicle (bulbous part of telson containing the venom glands). Granulation of the cephalothorax and mesosoma is slightly more pronounced in the male than in the female and the males have an excavation at the base of the fixed finger of the chelae to accommodate the females pincers during mating "dance".

A. maroccanus is distinct from most of the potentially sympatric, dark-colored species of Androctonus by its brighter coloration. It differs from the similar A. australis in having a strongly hirsute "fore-arm" (patella) of the pedipalps and a more reddish coloration. Furthermore, in Morocco A. australis is so far known only from the easternmost part of the country. Another yellow-colored species, A. amoreuxi, occurring in the south and southwest of Morocco, is distinguished by a much slender metasoma.

=== Toxicity ===
There are no data on the toxicity of this species. However, as it is the case in many other species of Androctonus, the presence of very potent toxins and a potential medical importance to humans can be anticipated.

== Range and habitat ==
A. maroccanus is known so far only from its type locality, the semi-arid coastal plain at Sidi Smaïl, c. 120 km southwest of Casablanca, Morocco. As several other of the seven species of Androctonus currently known from Morocco, it is considered endemic.
