= GiTx1 =

GiTx1 (β/κ-theraphotoxin-Gi1a)
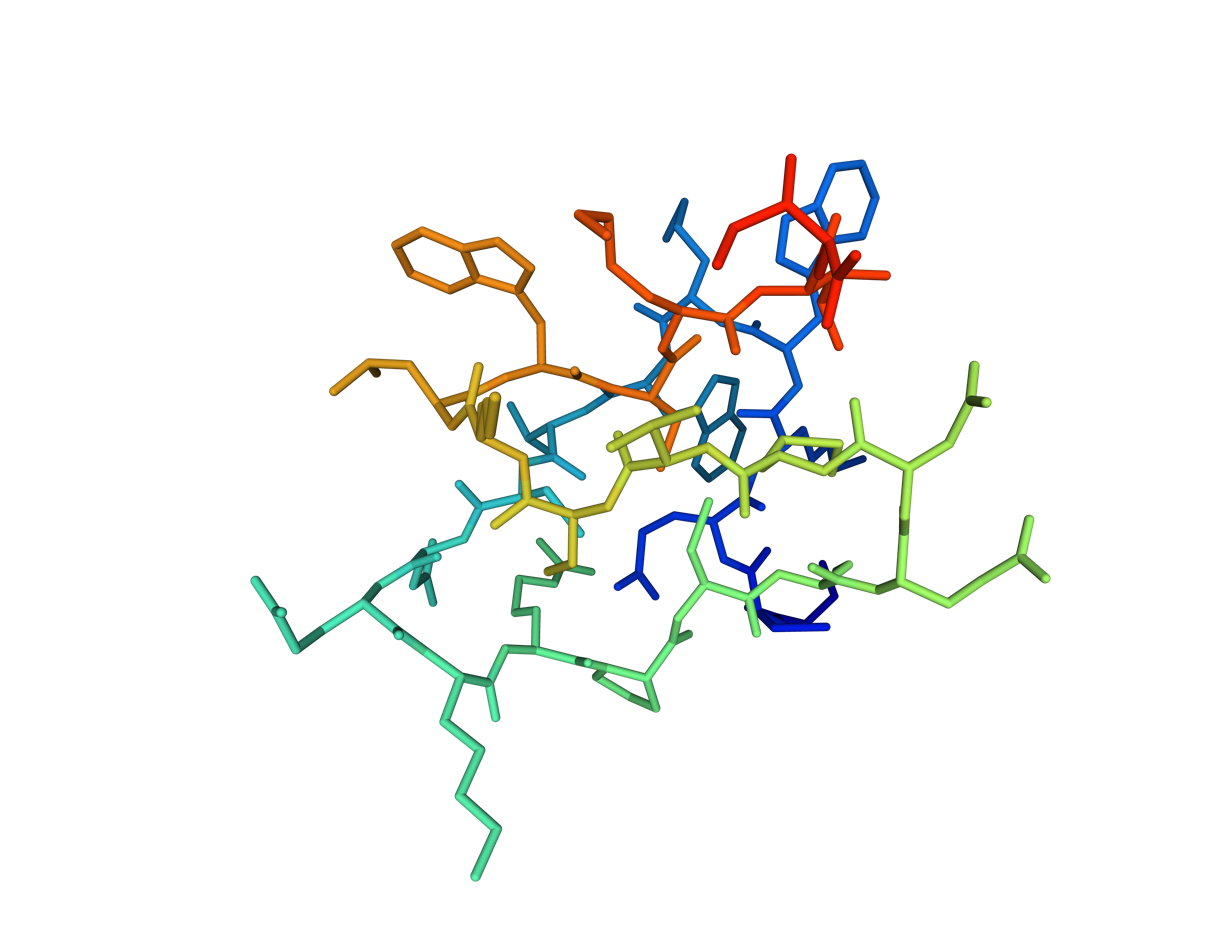
- Structural image of GiTx1

Identifiers
- Organism: Grammostola iheringi
- Symbol: N/A
- Orthologs: OMA: entry
- UniProt: C0HJJ7
Search for
- Structures: Swiss-model
- Domains: InterPro

GiTx1 (β/κ-theraphotoxin-Gi1a) is a peptide toxin present in the venom of Grammostola iheringi. It reduces both inward and outward currents by blocking voltage-gated sodium and potassium channels, respectively.

== Etymology & Source ==
GiTx1 is found in the venom of Grammostola iheringi, a Brazilian tarantula of the family Theraphosidae. GiTx1 is an abbreviation of (G)rammostola (i)heringi (T)o(x)in 1, and its rational nomenclature name is β/κ-theraphotoxin-Gi1a.

== Chemistry ==
GiTx1 is a positively charged protein that consists of 29 amino acids and has a molecular weight of 3585 Da.

Its amino acid sequence is:

SCQKWMWTCDQKRPCCEDMVCKLWCKIIK

The protein contains three disulfide bridges and six cysteine residues. This pattern of disulfide bridges between cysteine amino acids creates a motif called an inhibitory cystine knot found in various other spider toxins. The structure of the toxin is further characterized by two short stranded antiparallel beta sheets and two polypeptide loops.

Proteins with similar sequences to GiTx1 such as PaTx1 and PaTx 2, which are both phrixotoxins, have been shown to influence voltage-gated potassium channels in cardiac cells. Charged residues of GiTx1 are opposite of a set of hydrophobic amino acids similar to the structure of Protoxin-II, for which this hydrophobic phase is important for the interaction with the voltage-gated sodium channel sensor domain.

== Target and mode of action ==
GiTx1 is a neurotoxin that inhibits multiple voltage-gated ion channels. GiTx1 blocks several voltage-gated sodium and potassium channels reversibly, including mammalian rNav1.2, rNav1.4, mNav1.6, Kv4.3 hERG-potassium channels and arachnid VdNav.

In DRG cells, the inhibition is larger for the sodium current (40%) than for the outward potassium current (20%).

The effect of GiTx1 is different on the affected channels. The IC50 for hERG -potassium channels is 3695 ± 127 nM, while the IC50 for Nav1.6 is 156 ± 150 nM and that of VdNav is in the range of between 124 and 13 nM. For Kv4.3 channels, it is known that 90 percent of them are blocked by GiTx1.

== Toxicity ==
=== Toxicity in mice ===
Using the Grammostola iheringi’s venom by intraperitoneal injection in the range of 0.8-12.8 μg, the venom causes complete paralysis, resulting in death within 30 minutes for higher concentrations. When using the same type of injection with 0.5 μg of GiTx, the toxin shows very low toxicity.

Using the complete venom by injection in the cerebrospinal fluid (i.c.v), the toxicity increases. With a lower concentration (0.1-0.8 μg), the mice suffer from multiple symptoms such as rotating movements, disorientation and paralysis. At higher concentrations (0.8-1.6 μg), other symptoms occur on top of paralysis with severe mobility difficulty, including grunting and cyanosis. These paralyses are reversible at non-lethal doses. Surviving mice do not show symptoms after a period of 24 hours. Mice that were injected with 1 μg/animal GiTx1 by i.c.v also show this reversible paralysis within the first hour after the injection.

=== Toxicity in flies ===
The Toxicity of Grammostola iheringi's venom shows an LD50 of 0.20 μg/fly in Drosophila melanogaster while the LD50 of solely GiTx1 is slightly higher, namely 20.9 μg/g. Additionally, the dosage required to induce paralysis differs between GiTx1 and complete venom injection. Using the complete venom mixture, a dose of 0.015 μg/fly is sufficient to induce paralysis, while 0.1-0.4 μg/fly of just GiTx1 is needed for complete paralysation.
