= Androctonus australis hector insect toxin =

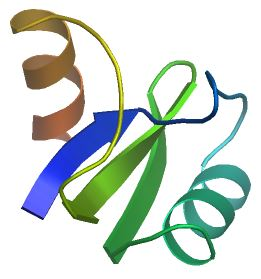

Names
- Other Names: AaHIT or AaIT
- Subtypes: AaHIT1, AaHIT2, AaHIT4 and AaHIT5

Source
- Latin name: Androctonus australis hector
- English name: Sahara scorpion

Target
- Target channel: Voltage-gated sodium channels

Beta-insect excitatory toxin 1

Identifiers
- Organism: Androctonus australis
- Symbol: AaHIT1
- UniProt: P01497
Search for
- Structures: Swiss-model
- Domains: InterPro

Scorpion toxin-like domain

Identifiers
- Symbol: Toxin_3
- Pfam: PF00537
- InterPro: IPR002061
Available protein structures:
- Pfam: structures / ECOD
- PDB: RCSB PDB; PDBe; PDBj
- PDBsum: structure summary

Androctonus australis hector insect toxin also known as AaHIT is a scorpion toxin which affects voltage-gated sodium channels. Four different insect toxins, namely AaHIT1, AaHIT2, AaHIT4 and AaHIT5, can be distinguished. It targets insects, except AaHIT4, which is also toxic to crustaceans and mammals.

== Etymology ==
The first three words of Androctonus australis hector insect toxin stem from the Greek words Androctonus and Hector, and the Latin word australis. Androctonus means ‘man-killer’, whereas Hector has the meaning ‘to hold or to possess’ and australis means ‘south’, together constituting ‘the southern man-killer’.

== Species distribution ==
AaHIT can be found in the venom of the North African scorpion, Androctonus australis hector, also known as the Sahara scorpion.

== Structure ==
There are four different forms of AaH insect toxins: AaHIT1, AaHIT2, AaHIT4 and AaHIT5.

The amino acid sequence of AaHIT1 and AaHIT2 only differs at position 17 and 41. The homology between AaHIT4 and AaHIT5 is greater than with the primary structures of AaHIT1 or AaHIT2.

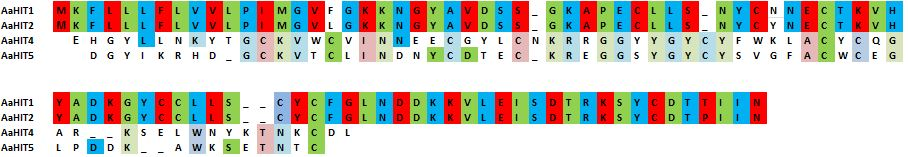

== Mode of action ==
AaHIT specifically affects the voltage-gated sodium channels (VGSC) in insects. The effect of the toxin is excitatory since it shifts the voltage-dependent activation of the sodium channel to lower potentials. This mode of action is comparable to those of beta-toxins. The insect-specific trait most likely derives from the presence of a specific structured loop in the insect VGSCs. In spite of this, some research has shown that AaHIT4 specifically can affect the mammalian sodium channel by modulating alfa- and beta-type anti-mammal neurotoxins binding.

== Toxicity ==
The toxin induces muscle contractions of the insects leading to full-body paralysis. Skeletal muscles contract due to the release of excitatory neurotransmitters at the neuromuscular junction. Apart from the AaHIT4 subtype, this effect does not occur in arachnids, crustaceans or mammals.

== Applications ==
AaHIT seems to be a promising candidate in pest control, e.g. cotton bollworm larvae can be reduced 44-98% by creating transgenic cotton crops which express the AaHIT gene. Another example in which AaHIT can be used as an insecticide is via baculoviruses. Baculoviruses are themselves insect-specific viruses; they can be potentiated if they express the AaHIT gene. The potentiated viruses kill the insects faster, resulting in less damage to the crops.
