= Tityustoxin peptide 2 =

SCOP classification
- Class: Small proteins
- Superfamily: Scorpion toxin-like
- Family: Short-chain scorpion toxin
- Species: Tityus serrulatus
- UniProt: P0C175

Tityustoxin peptide 2 (TsPep2) is a peptide isolated from the venom of the Tityus serrulatus (Brazilian yellow scorpion). It belongs to a class of short peptides, together with Tityustoxin peptide 1 and Tityustoxin peptide 3.

== Sources ==
Tityus serrulatus, also known as the Brazilian yellow scorpion, is from the genus Tityus belonging to the family Buthidae.

TsPep2 is identified from the venom of Tityus serrulatus by using a cDNA primer sequence based on the C-terminal amino acid sequence of KTx2 from Androctonus australis.

== Chemistry ==
The original encoded sequence of TsPep2 consists of 68 amino acids processed in a mature peptide of 29 amino acids with a final molecular weight of 2993.59 Da. TsPep2 differs in the mature sequence from TsPep3 only in one amino acid and TsPep1 shows 58,6% of sequence homology with Tspep2 and TsPep3.

TsPep2 Sequence
10	20	30	40	50	60
MKFSCGFLLI	FLVLSAMIAT	FSEVEATVKC	GGCNRKCCAG	GCRSGKCING	KCQCYGRSDL NEEFENYQ

Eight cysteines establish four disulfide bridges and a C-terminal tyrosine amide is present in the 55th position. Furthermore, TsPep2 sequence alignment shows that a part of the amino acid consensus sequence (CXXXKCCXC) involved in the pore blocking mechanism is present as in other known short scorpion toxins.

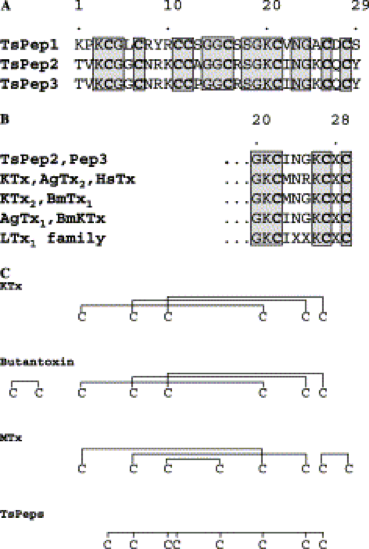
The sequence alignment of TsPep2, TsPep1 and TsPep3.

== Target ==
It seems likely that TsPep2 has inhibitory actions on potassium channels, based on its sequence similarities in the C-terminal beta sheet with the potassium channel inhibitory alpha family (α-KTX) and on its similarities in the patterns of disulfide bridges with other short scorpion venom toxins.

== Toxicity ==
The biological function of TsPep2 is not clear yet, except from a small displacement on the ^{125}I-KTX binding site on rat brain synaptosomes. However, it has been shown that this peptide is not toxic to mice. The LD_{50} of TsPep2 is currently unknown.
