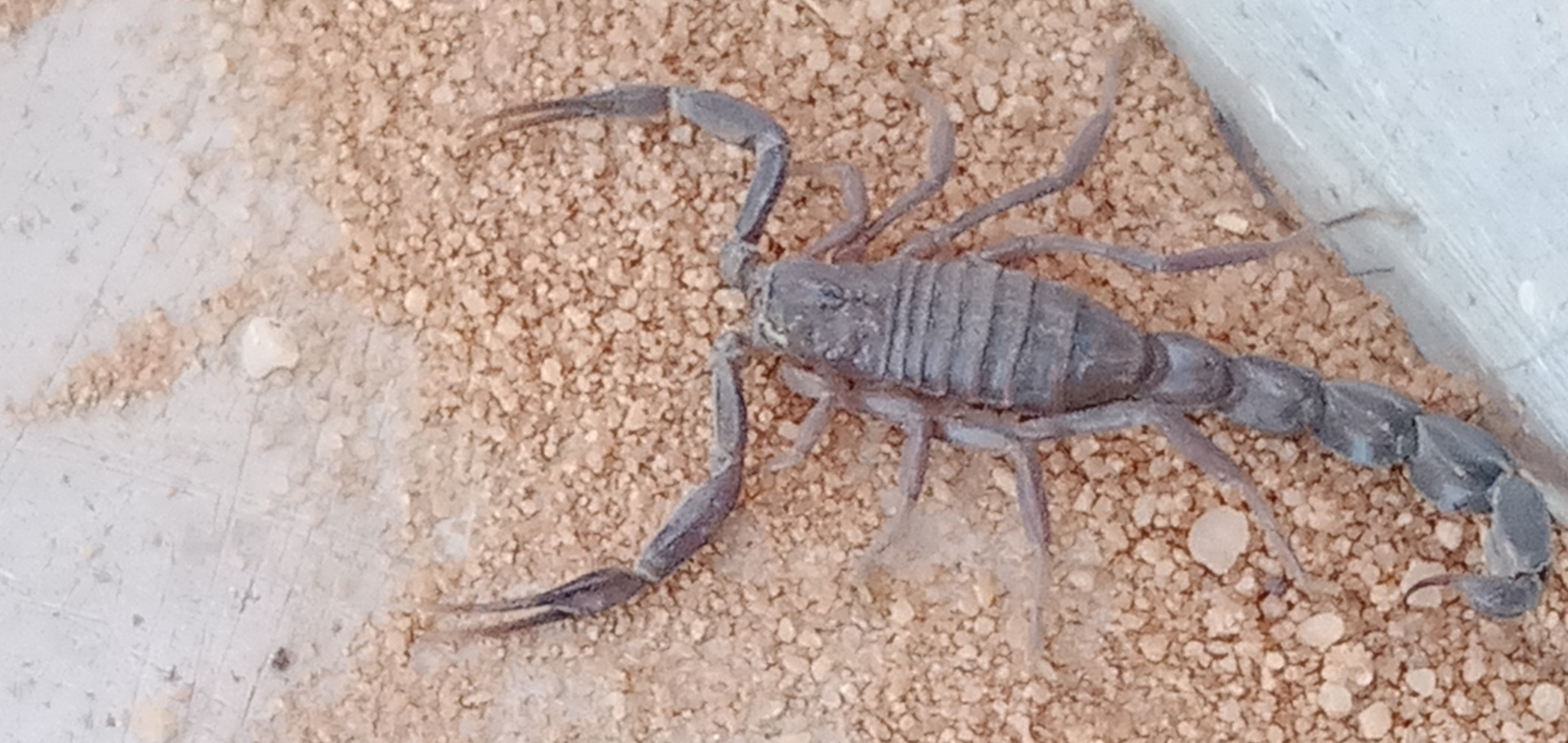

Scientific classification
- Kingdom: Animalia
- Phylum: Arthropoda
- Subphylum: Chelicerata
- Class: Arachnida
- Order: Scorpiones
- Family: Buthidae
- Genus: Androctonus
- Species: A. ammoneus

Binomial name
- Androctonus ammoneus Yagmur, Al-Saraireh & Abu Afifeh, 2025

= Androctonus ammoneus =

Fat-tailed scorpion species

Androctonus ammoneus is a species of fat-tailed scorpion. It was formally described in 2025. These scorpions are found throughout the Middle Eastern country of Jordan, but are particularly common in the eastern deserts. All Androctonus species have powerful neurotoxic venom, but this species in particular has a tendency to seek human-adjacent habitat with commensurate increased risk of human injury. The specific name comes from the ancient Levantine kingdom of Ammon. Specimens of A. ammoneus were previously described as A. crassicauda.
