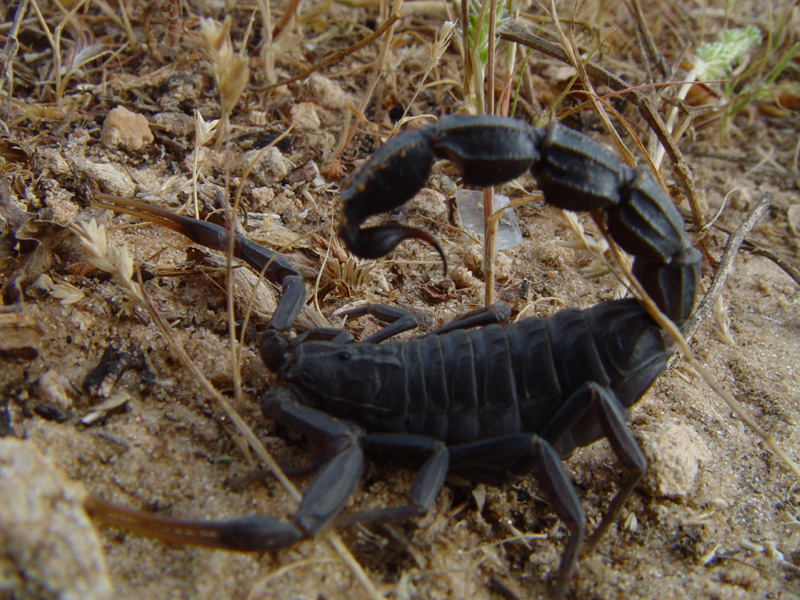

Scientific classification
- Domain: Eukaryota
- Kingdom: Animalia
- Phylum: Arthropoda
- Subphylum: Chelicerata
- Class: Arachnida
- Order: Scorpiones
- Family: Buthidae
- Genus: Androctonus
- Species: A. bicolor

Binomial name
- Androctonus bicolor (Ehrenberg, 1828)

= Androctonus bicolor =

Black fat–tailed scorpion

Species of scorpion

Androctonus bicolor, the black fat-tailed scorpion, is a scorpion species of the family Buthidae. It is black in color and can grow up to 8 cm. Black fat-tailed scorpions come from the family Buthidae, which is the largest of the scorpion family. They can be identified by their hefty physique. They tend to move very fast, and are of an aggressive nature. Black fat–tailed scorpions can live for up to 5 years. Adults can reach up to 40-60 millimeters, 80 millimeters being the maximum. These scorpions typically possess black and brown coloration. These scorpions enjoy making scrapes with wood and rocks, and are nocturnal, thus they hide in crevices or certain objects during the day. They stay in shade to retain moisture (that they obtain from prey) in their bodies, as they are susceptible to losing moisture due to their environmental preference.

== Location ==
Androctonus is widespread in North and West Africa, the Middle East, but the wider family tolerates a wider range of habitats. This relates to the fact that black fat-tailed scorpions are rather efficient when temperatures range from 29 °C-35 °C, as this temperature allows for productive growth. Black fat–tailed scorpions are normally found in arid or semi-arid areas as well as margins of desert areas, typically areas with sandy soil. They generally prefer warm and dry areas.

== Taxonomy ==
The black fat-tailed scorpion belongs to the genus Androctonus, which can be translated into "man-killer". The species name is bicolor which is translated into having two-colors, which could be referring to their brown-black coloration. Scorpions are under the class Arachnida, because they are arachnids that have eight legs.

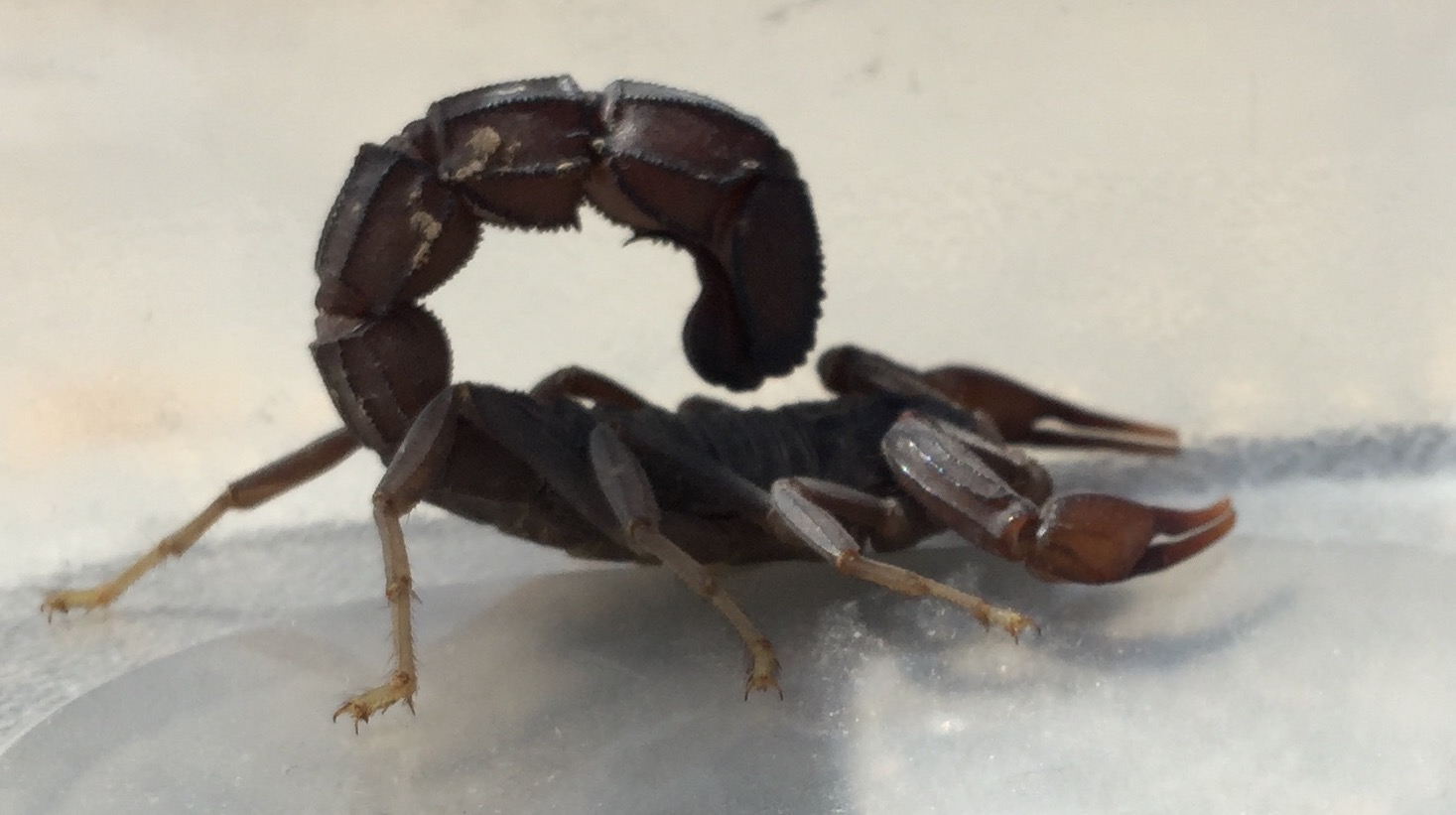
Fat-Tailed Scorpion in Iraq

== Eating habits ==
Scorpions can eat many kinds of insects, spiders, lizards, small mammals such as mice, or even other scorpions. Scorpions are able to go months without consuming food. Prey is captured and crushed by its pincers, while their stingers are used to inject venom into their prey. This paralyzes the prey, causing immobility and allowing the scorpion to consume it with ease. Scorpions use their chelicerae (small claw-like structures attached to their mouths) to pull small parts off their prey, this is simple for them as chelicerae are quite sharp. Scorpions are only able to ingest liquids, thus their chelicerae help them dispose of solid parts that cannot be consumed.

== Venom ==
Black fat–tailed scorpions use neurotoxic venom, which is fast acting and can be absorbed very quickly, because of the small molecular weight of the proteins that make up the venom. These neurotoxins act on the central nervous system, causing paralysis in the nerves that are responsible for respiration, which ultimately causes death by respiratory failure. The neurotoxins may also cause widespread neuronal excitation, symptoms of which can include pain, sweating, salivation, and tearing. Severe envenomation is likely, as the rate of envenoming is 10-20%, making it potentially lethal. Victims are likely to feel progressively weaker after envenoming. Envenoming can result in death, which can occur between 5 and 15 hours, but it is also possible for death to occur within one hour. Examples of common symptoms that occur after a sting are: drowsiness, drooping eyelids, paralysis of neck muscles, loss of muscle coordination, and abdominal pain. A monovalent antivenom (an antivenom that heals stings of specific species) called Anti-scorpionique is available to treat stings from a black fat-tailed scorpion.
