= Protoxin-I =

Peptide neurotoxin

Protoxin-I, also known as ProTx-I, or Beta/omega-theraphotoxin-Tp1a, is a 35-amino-acid peptide neurotoxin extracted from the venom of the tarantula Thrixopelma pruriens. Protoxin-I belongs to the inhibitory cystine knot (ICK) family of peptide toxins, which have been known to potently inhibit voltage-gated ion channels. Protoxin-I selectively blocks low voltage threshold T-type calcium channels, voltage gated sodium channels and the nociceptor cation channel TRPA1. Due to its unique ability to bind to TRPA1, Protoxin-I has been implicated as a valuable pharmacological reagent with potential applications in clinical contexts with regards to pain and inflammation

== Origin ==
Protoxin-I is a toxin extracted from the venom of the tarantula spider Thrixopelma pruriens, also known as the Peruvian green velvet spider. It is used by the spider to immobilise and catch prey. The primary structure of the mature toxin peptide is homologous to that of Beta/omega-theraphotoxin-Bp1a from the tarantula spider Bumba pulcherrimaklaasi, suggesting a common toxin within the subfamily Theraphosinae.

== Structure and active site ==
Protoxin-I is a peptide possessing a 35 amino acid sequence of Glu-Cys-Arg-Tyr-Trp-Leu-Gly-Gly-Cys-Ser-Ala-Gly-Gln-Thr-Cys-Cys-Lys-His-Leu-Val-Cys-Ser-Arg-Arg-His-Gly-Trp-Cys-Val-Trp-Asp-Gly-Thr-Phe-Ser (see Table 1 for one-letter sequence) with 3 disulphide bonds between Cys2-Cys16, Cys9-Cys21 and Cys15-Cys28. Nuclear Magnetic Resonance Spectroscopy of Protoxin-I revealed two beta strands in the protein structure. Gating-modifier toxins isolated from spider venom all share a conserved molecular structure consisting of a hydrophobic patch, populated by hydrophobic residues, and surrounded by a ring of positively- and negatively charged residues that promote the binding of the peptide to the lipid membrane.

Table 1: Protoxin-I Sequence
1				5					10					15					20					25					30					35
E	C	R	Y	W	L	G	G	C	S	A	G	Q	T	C	C	K	H	L	V	C	S	R	R	H	G	W	C	V	W	D	G	T	F	S

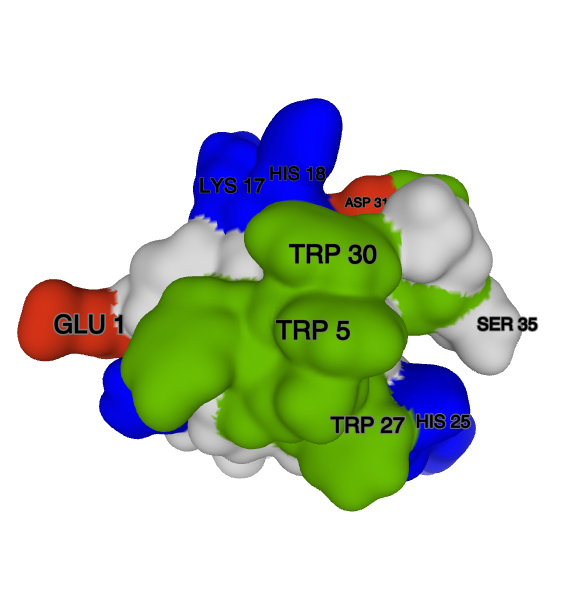
Surface profile of Protoxin-I coloured in accordance to residue characteristic: hydrophobic (green), positively charged (blue), negatively charged (red), uncharged (grey).

By systematically exchanging single amino acids by an alanine, features responsible for Protoxin-I toxicity can be revealed. As such, the replacements R3A, W5A, K17E, L19A, S22A, R23A, W27A, V29A, W30A, D31A, G31A, F34A reduce the toxin's ability to inhibit sodium channels Na_{V}1.2. Similarly, the replacements L6A, L19A, W27A, V29A, W30A, D31A also reduce its inhibitory effects on Na_{V}1.7 sodium channels. Lastly, the replacements Q13A, L19A, S22A, W30A, F34A, S35A reveal the active sites for Protoxin-I binding to TRPA1 receptors. These loss-of-function replacements primarily represent residues in the hydrophobic patch and positively- and negatively charged rings, further supporting the idea that these regions play an important role in ion channel binding.

== Toxicodynamics ==
Like other gating-modifier spider toxins, Protoxin-I preferentially binds to anionic lipid-containing membranes where it exhibits complex allosteric interactions with ion channel voltage sensor domains. After binding to the lipid membrane, Protoxin-I adopts a shallow position on the anionic membrane with the help of tryptophan residues within the hydrophobic patch, where the positively- and negatively charged rings on the toxin are then able to bind to conserved sequences of hydrophobic and anionic residues on voltage gated ion channels.

=== Voltage-gated sodium channels ===
Similar to other gating-modifier toxins of the ICK family, Protoxin-I works by shifting the voltage dependence of activation of voltage-gated sodium channels to more positive potentials. Protoxin-I differs from other ICK toxins as Protoxin-I exhibits little selectivity between sodium channels, and is thus able to potently inhibit TTX-resistant sodium currents in sensory neurons through interaction with the Na_{v}1.8 channel. Protoxin-I has been found to potently bind to Na_{V}1.2, Na_{V}1.6, Na_{V}1.7 and Na_{V}1.8. The pore-forming α subunit of voltage-gated sodium channels consists of 4 homologous domains, each having their own voltage sensor domain. Research has shown that Protoxin-I interacts with the voltage sensor domains of domain II and domain IV, thereby functionally inhibiting the channel. Protoxin-I promiscuity in binding to voltage-gated sodium channels is believed to be because of the high amount of positively charged residues on the peptide surface, which bind to conserved amino acid sequences on the surface of the voltage-sensor domain on sodium channels. This notion is further back by the fact that Protoxin-I binds less potently to Na_{V}1.4 and Na_{V}1.5, which exhibit relatively fewer anionic residues on the voltage sensor domain.

=== Voltage-Gated T-type calcium channels ===
Protoxin-I has also been found to shift the voltage dependence of activation of the T-type calcium channels. In particular, Protoxin-I is able to differentiate Ca_{V}3.1 channels from other human T-type calcium channels, exhibiting a 160-fold increase in potency over that of Ca_{V}3.2, and a 10-fold increase in potency over that of Ca_{V}3.3. Protoxin-I shifts the voltage dependence of activation of T-type calcium channels to more positive potentials, without changing its voltage dependence of inactivation. Through the use of chimeric channel proteins, the S3-S4 linker on domain IV of the Ca_{V}3.1 channel protein has been identified in having greater sensitivity towards Protoxin-I, suggesting that this domain exhibits specific residues that are susceptible to Protoxin-I binding.

=== Transient receptor potential ankyrin 1 (TRPA1) ===
Protoxin was identified to be the first high-affinity peptide TRPA1 antagonist. TRPA1 is a primary nociceptor channel expressed on the plasma membrane of many human and animal cells. Na_{V}1.2 and TRPA1 were found to have partially homologous binding sites by which Protoxin-I binds to these ion channels. These binding surfaces are, similar to that of sodium channels, located on the extracellular loops of the S1-S4 gating domain of the TRPA1 channel.

== Therapeutic uses ==
In vivo testing in mice revealed that intrathecal injection of Protoxin-I reduces the response to formalin in acute pain and inflammation without signs of neurotoxicity.

Modifications to Protoxin-I can induce altered specificity in binding, producing peptides that only bind to either the TRPA1 or Na_{V}1.2 gating mechanism. This may provide a deeper insight into the biophysiological function and mechanisms underlying TRPA1, with potential clinical applications in pain and inflammation treatment. TRPA1 represents the final common pathway for many pronociceptive induced pathophysiological pain, therefore, pain therapy using TRPA1 antagonists can be expected to have applicable pharmacological use
