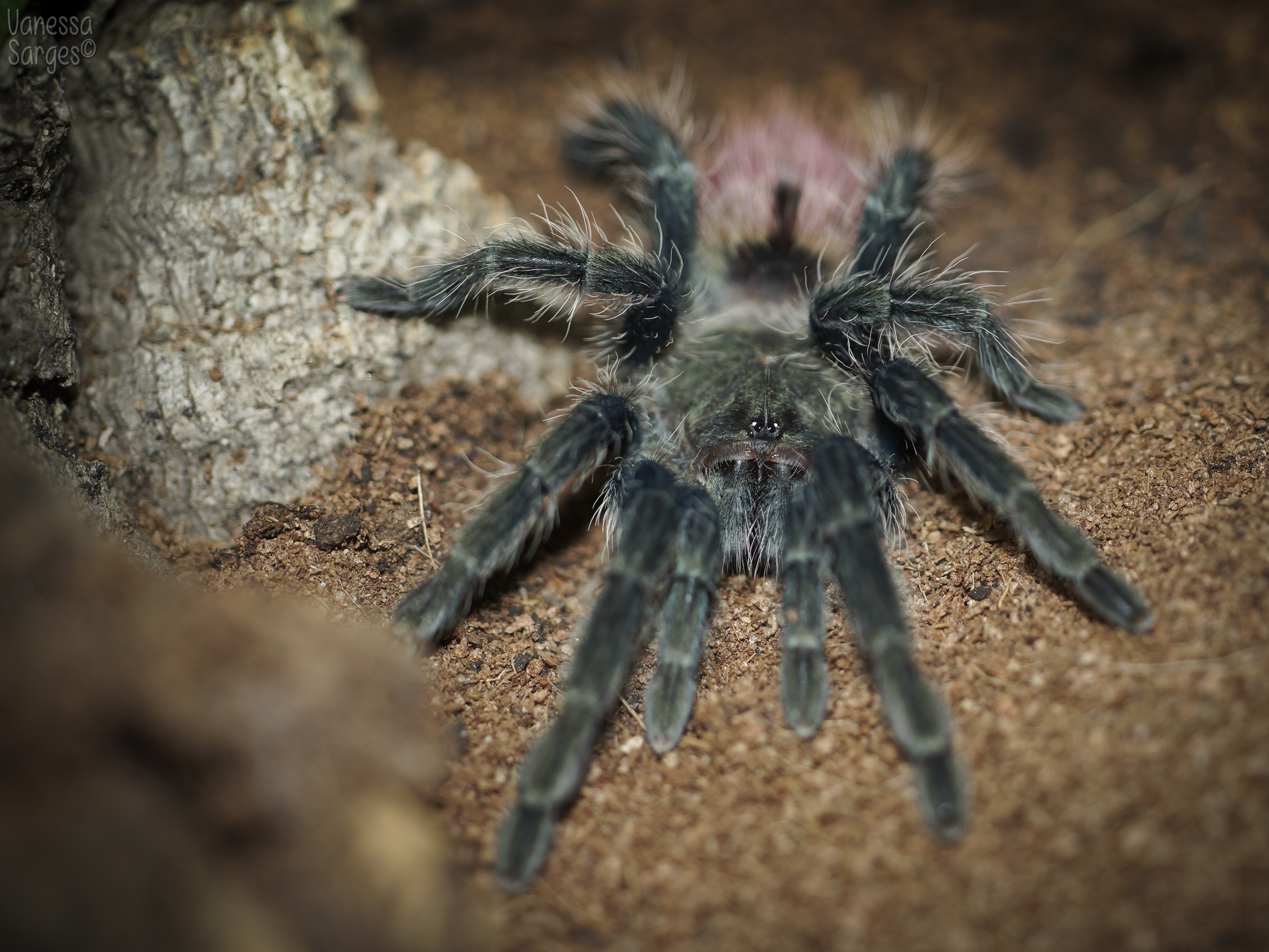

Scientific classification
- Kingdom: Animalia
- Phylum: Arthropoda
- Subphylum: Chelicerata
- Class: Arachnida
- Order: Araneae
- Infraorder: Mygalomorphae
- Clade: Avicularioidea
- Family: Theraphosidae
- Genus: Thrixopelma
- Species: T. ockerti

Binomial name
- Thrixopelma ockerti Schmidt, 1994

= Thrixopelma ockerti =

Species of spider endemic to Peru

Thrixopelma ockerti, commonly known as the Peruvian Flame Rump or Flame Rump Tree Spider, is a species of tarantula and the type species of the genus Thrixopelma. It is endemic to Peru and was first described by Gunter Schmidt in 1994. It is named ockerti after the collector Roland Ockert.

== Description ==
Females live up to 15 years, while males live only up to 4. Their carapace and legs are a dark blue, almost black, the opisthosoma is the same color, covered in reddish, pinkish hairs, with a darker colored urticating patch.

== Habitat ==
This species is typically found in Huánuco Province, Peru. It lives in both jungles and mountain ranges, with average temperatures of 24°C, and average yearly rainfall of 400mm.

== Behavior ==
They are semi arboreal, semi terrestrial tarantulas, they're surprisingly docile and calm tarantulas being out on the open for the majority of the time. They own urticating hairs they are not afraid to use, throwing them to anyone who bothers them. In nature they can be seen somewhat communal, but in captivity this is not recommended at all.
