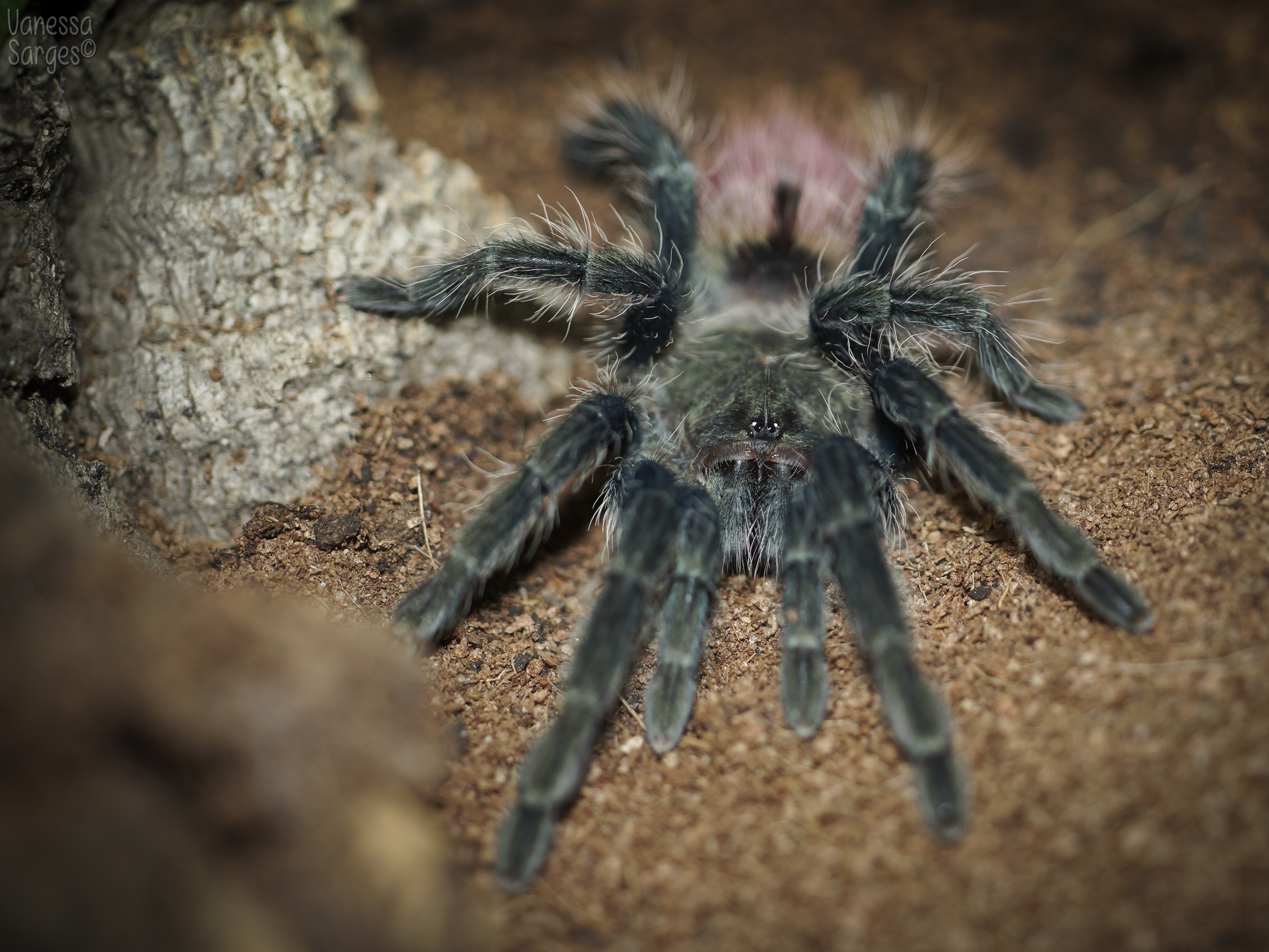
- A juvenile female Thrixopelma ockerti

Scientific classification
- Kingdom: Animalia
- Phylum: Arthropoda
- Subphylum: Chelicerata
- Class: Arachnida
- Order: Araneae
- Infraorder: Mygalomorphae
- Family: Theraphosidae
- Genus: Thrixopelma; Schmidt, 1994

Type species
- T. ockerti Schmidt, 1994

Species
- 8, see text

= Thrixopelma =

Genus of spiders

Thrixopelma is a genus of South American tarantulas that was first described by Günter E. W. Schmidt in 1994. They are medium to large tarantulas, usually being 35mm to 60mm in body length.

== Diagnosis ==
Males can be distinguished by the presence of two crests in the palpal bulb. Females can be distinguished by the spermathecae, which is made up of two separate hypersclerotized receptacles. This genus also own type 3 urticating hairs, or both type 3 and 4.

== Species ==
As of August 2022 it contains 8 species, found in South America:

- Thrixopelma aymara (Chamberlin, 1916) – Peru
- Thrixopelma cyaneolum Schmidt, Friebolin & Friebolin, 2005 – Peru
- Thrixopelma lagunas Schmidt & Rudloff, 2010 – Peru
- Thrixopelma longicolli (Schmidt, 2003) – Ecuador, Peru
- Thrixopelma nadineae Sherwood & Gabriel, 2022 - Ecuador
- Thrixopelma ockerti Schmidt, 1994 (type) – Peru
- Thrixopelma peruvianum (Schmidt, 2007) – Peru
- Thrixopelma pruriens Schmidt, 1998 – Chile
