= Protoxin-II =

Neurotoxin

Protoxin-II, also known as ProTx-II, PT-II or β/ω-TRTX-Tp2a, is a neurotoxin that inhibits certain voltage-gated calcium and voltage-gated sodium channels. This toxin is a 30-residue disulfide-rich peptide that has unusually high affinity and selectivity toward the human Nav1.7. channel.

== Sources ==
Protoxin-II is a neurotoxin that is derived from the venom of the Peruvian green velvet tarantula (Thrixopelma pruriens).

== Chemistry ==
ProTx-II is a 30-amino acid peptide with a molecular weight of 3826.65 Da. The structure of ProTx-II is amphipathic, with mostly hydrophobic residues on one face of the toxin. The toxin is formed by an inhibitor cystine knot (ICK) backbone region and a flexible C-terminal tail region.

== Target ==
ProTx-II inhibits several human sodium channel subtypes, ranging from Nav1.1 up to Nav1.8. However, this toxin is, at least, 100-fold more potent against Nav1.7 than other human Nav channel subtypes. At a concentration of 0.3 nM, this toxin blocks Nav1.7 by 50%.

Besides sodium channels, ProTx-II also inhibits some subtypes of voltage-gated calcium channels, Cav1.2 and Cav3.2. From the fact that ProTx-II is able to inhibit several sodium and calcium channel subtypes, we can infer that the toxin-channel interaction surface is conserved between these channels.

== Mechanism of action ==
ProTx-II acts as an antagonist of Nav1.7 by binding to the voltage-sensor domain 2 (VSD-II) of the channel. The toxin inhibits the activation of Nav channels by binding to the linker in the L3-4 loop (between the S3 and S4 segments) above the central cavity of VSD-II, which is known as site 4. ProTx-II inhibits sodium currents by shifting the voltage-dependence of the channel activation to more positive potentials. The toxin uses a similar action mechanism on the Cav1.2 and Cav1.3 voltage-gated calcium channels: shifting the activation of these L-type and T-type calcium channels, respectively, to more positive voltages.

ProTx-II also inhibits fast inactivation of the Nav channel by binding to VSD-IV in the resting configuration of the channel. The inhibition of activation and of inactivation appear to be independent processes. For instance, mutations in domain IV substantially affect the inhibition of inactivation without changing the inhibition of activation by ProTx-II. Likewise, mutations in domain II mostly affect the inhibition of activation. Therefore, it seems that ProTx-II is able to interact with two independent sites (DIV and DII) at the same time. Another factor that supports this theory is the estimated IC50. The IC50 for inhibition of activation is approximately 400-fold smaller than the one calculated for inhibition of inactivation, again suggesting that the inhibition of activation and the inhibition of inactivation are independent processes.

== Biological effects ==
ProTx-II provokes an analgesic effect on rats. The toxin acts on free nerve endings and primary sensory neurons after burn injury. ProTx-II produces an inhibitory effect on spinal nociceptive processing by inhibiting the Nav1.7 sodium channel.
