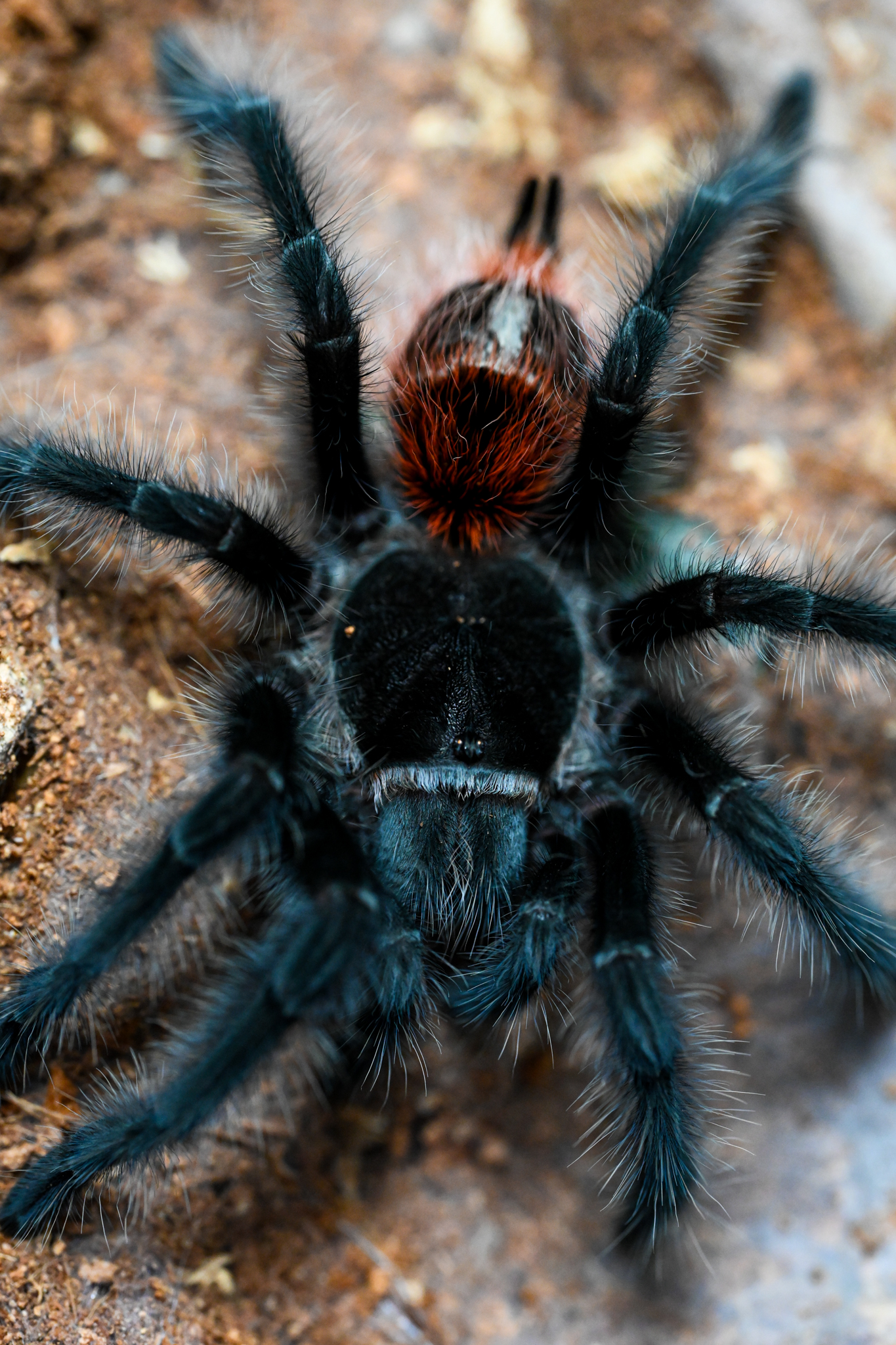

Scientific classification
- Kingdom: Animalia
- Phylum: Arthropoda
- Subphylum: Chelicerata
- Class: Arachnida
- Order: Araneae
- Infraorder: Mygalomorphae
- Family: Theraphosidae
- Genus: Grammostola
- Species: G. iheringi

Binomial name
- Grammostola iheringi Keyserling, 1891

= Grammostola iheringi =

Species of arachnid

Grammostola iheringi also known as the Entre Rios tarantula, it was first described by Keyserling in 1891. They are found in Brazil, and is considered the biggest tarantula in the Grammostola genus.

== Description ==
Females can live a bit over 20 years, and can grow to up to 23cm. They are leggier than most others in the Grammostola genus, and also differs from them by their behavior. They have velvety black legs, which have a slight blue tint. And a black carapace, which is bordered by an orange coloration. The opisthosoma is a dark red color.

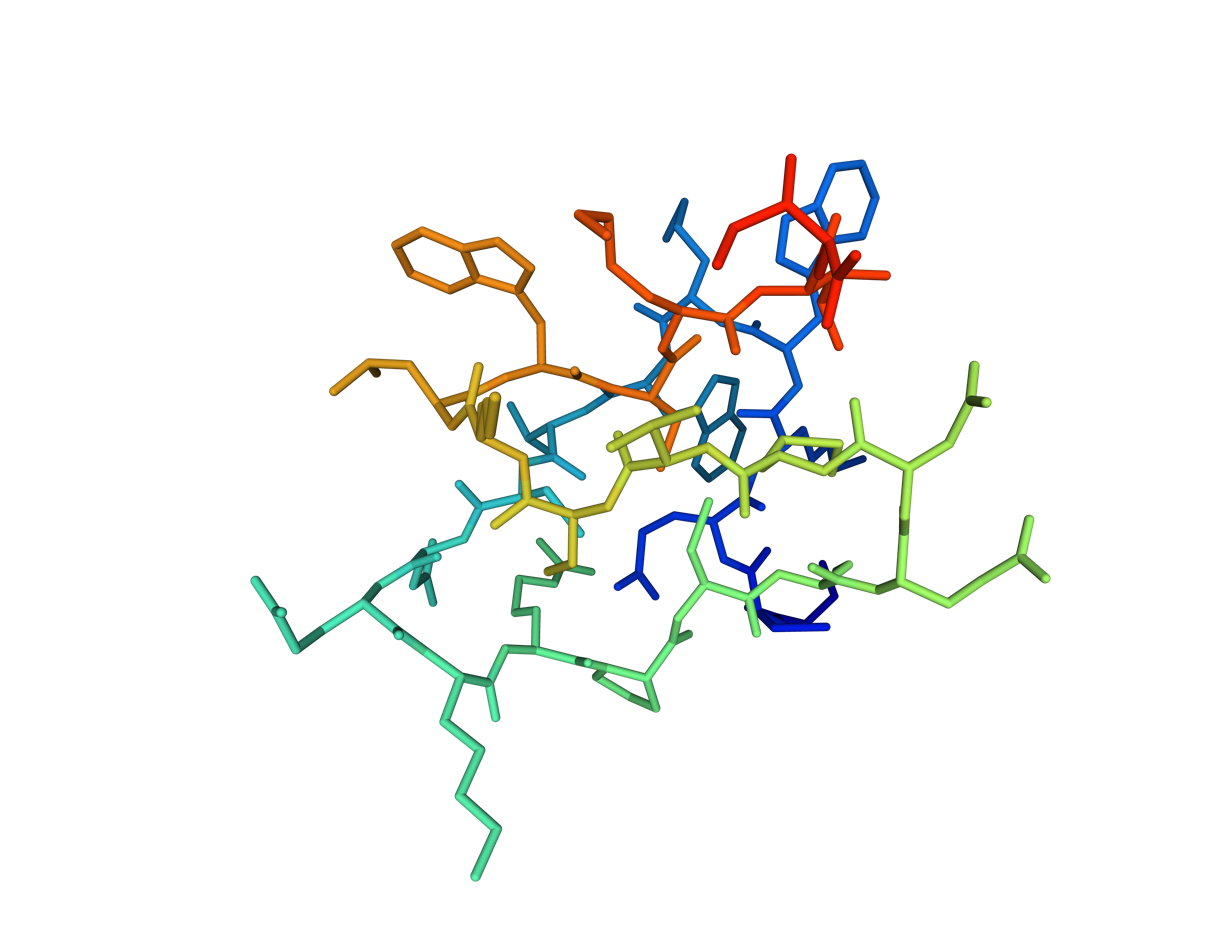
Structural image of GiTx1

== Venom ==
As most New World Tarantulas, this species lacks potent venom. Although their venom has been analyzed, and the toxin Gitx1 was found. The effects of this toxin in mice ranges from rotating movements, disorientation and paralysis, to complete paralysis and death. Depending on the amount of the toxin inserted. The venom name comes from the initials of this species and toxin, plus the x from toxin.

== Behavior ==
Compared to the others in the Grammostola genus, this species is an outlier. They are quite an active tarantula, and a bit defensive. It is usually out in the open, though they are quite skittish. They also present a stalking tactic for hunting, which differs from the more typical ambush strategy.
