= Androctonus kunti =

Scientific classification
- Kingdom: Animalia
- Phylum: Arthropoda
- Subphylum: Chelicerata
- Class: Arachnida
- Order: Scorpiones
- Family: Buthidae
- Genus: Androctonus
- Species: A. kunti

Binomial name
- Androctonus kunti Yağmur, 2023
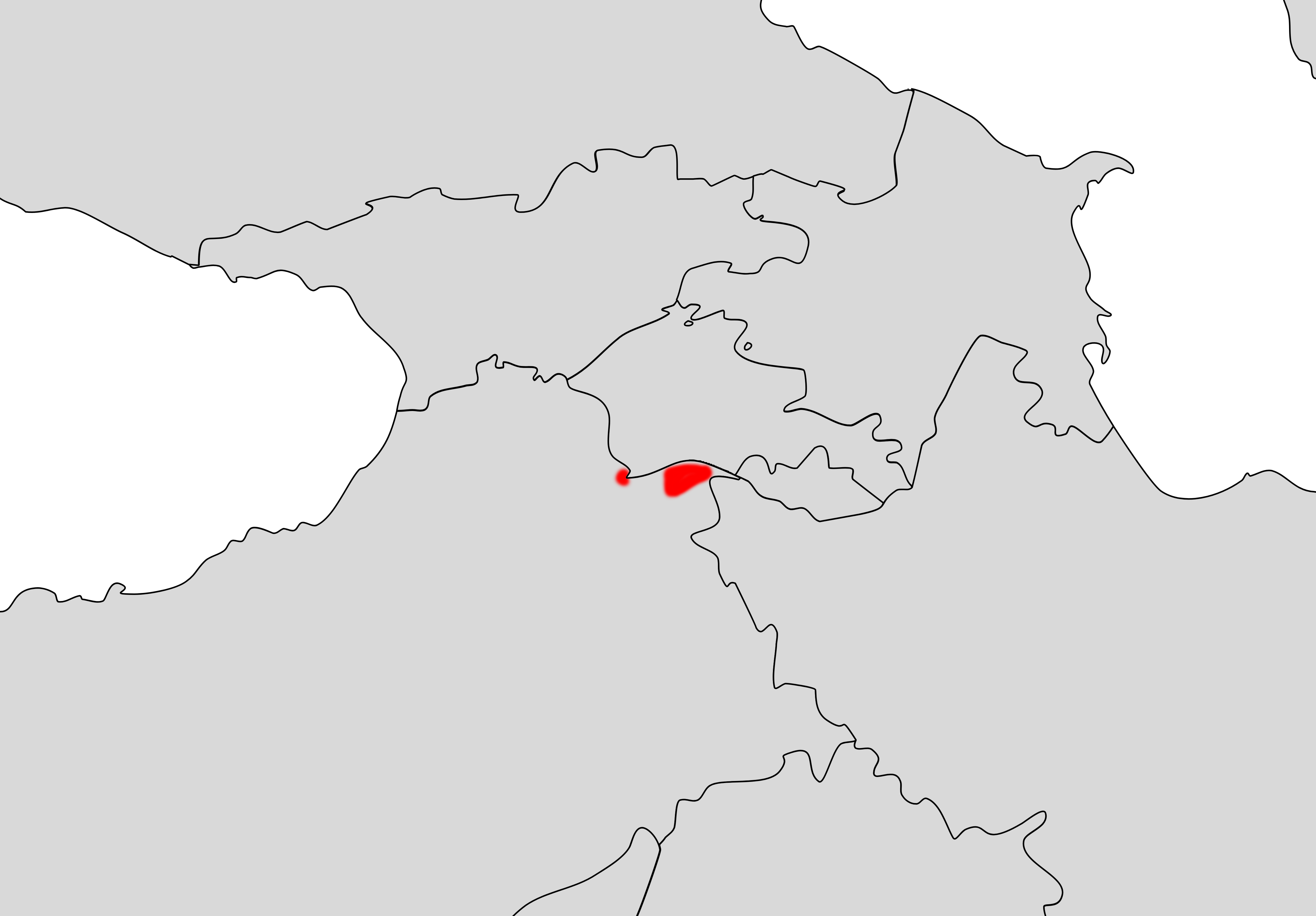
- Distribution of A. kunti in east Turkey

Species of scorpion

Androctonus kunti is a species of scorpion in the family Buthidae. It was described by Ersen Aydın Yağmur in 2023.
