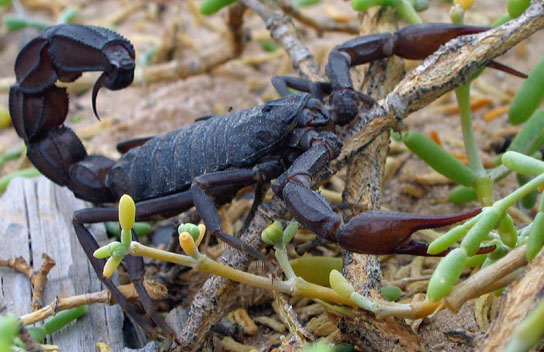

Scientific classification
- Kingdom: Animalia
- Phylum: Arthropoda
- Subphylum: Chelicerata
- Class: Arachnida
- Order: Scorpiones
- Family: Buthidae
- Genus: Androctonus
- Species: A. crassicauda

Binomial name
- Androctonus crassicauda (Olivier, 1807)

= Androctonus crassicauda =

Arabian fat-tailed scorpion

Species of scorpion

Androctonus crassicauda, the Arabian fat-tailed scorpion, is a species of extremely dangerous scorpion usually found in North Africa and the Middle East.

Widely known and feared across its range for its powerful and potentially fatal venom, this scorpion species is the namesake of pioneering Iraqi thrash metal band Acrassicauda.

== Description ==
Androctonus crassicauda is a generalist desert species, an Old World scorpion. Adults can vary in colour from a light brown to reddish to blackish-brown, to black. They can grow to over 10 centimetres (3.9 in) in length.

== Distribution and habitat ==
This species is found mainly in the Palaearctic region, in such countries as Turkey, Iran, and other southwestern Asian nations. A. crassicauda lives in the ruins of old, neglected structures, and was considered a potential hazard for troops during the Persian Gulf conflict, though it was an unaggressive species that had no reports of stings. It also occurs in margins of desert (arid, semi-arid) places and sometimes accumulated vegetation debris.

== Behavior ==
A nocturnal scorpion, it hides in crevices and under objects during the day, and at night hunts insects and other invertebrates, or small lizards.

== Venom ==
The venom is mainly composed of neurotoxins, cardiotoxins, and possibly myotoxins. Victims of the sting have reported local effects (intense pain, redness and swelling). Systemic effects include heart malfunctions, remote internal bleeding, visual disturbance, and respiratory problems. The venom is very powerful and considered among the most potent among scorpions, and is known to cause human death. Deaths mostly occur with respiratory arrest, heart failure, and shock. The LD_{50} for this species is 0.08 mg/kg (IV) and 0.40 mg/kg (SC).

== Antivenom ==
Antivenom produced by this species has been used in Turkey to treat all scorpion stings since 1942.
