= Thrixopelma pruriens =

Peruvian green velvet tarantula

Scientific classification
- Kingdom: Animalia
- Phylum: Arthropoda
- Subphylum: Chelicerata
- Class: Arachnida
- Order: Araneae
- Infraorder: Mygalomorphae
- Family: Theraphosidae
- Genus: Thrixopelma
- Species: T. pruriens

Binomial name
- Thrixopelma pruriens Schmidt, 1998

Species of spider

Thrixopelma pruriens, known as the Peruvian green velvet tarantula, is a species of tarantula found in Chile and Peru in South America.

Though docile, this species is rarely kept as a pet in part due to its tendency to fling urticating hairs with minimal provocation.

In 2014, researchers at Yale University identified a toxin called Protoxin-I from the tarantula's venom that shows promise as a new painkiller drug. The toxin reduces activity in an ion channel associated with inflammation and neuropathic pain, making it potentially suitable as a treatment for both normal pain and pathological pain syndromes.
