= Androctonus amoreuxi =

African fattail scorpion

Scientific classification
- Kingdom: Animalia
- Phylum: Arthropoda
- Subphylum: Chelicerata
- Class: Arachnida
- Order: Scorpiones
- Family: Buthidae
- Genus: Androctonus
- Species: A. amoreuxi

Binomial name
- Androctonus amoreuxi (Audouin, 1826)

Species of scorpion

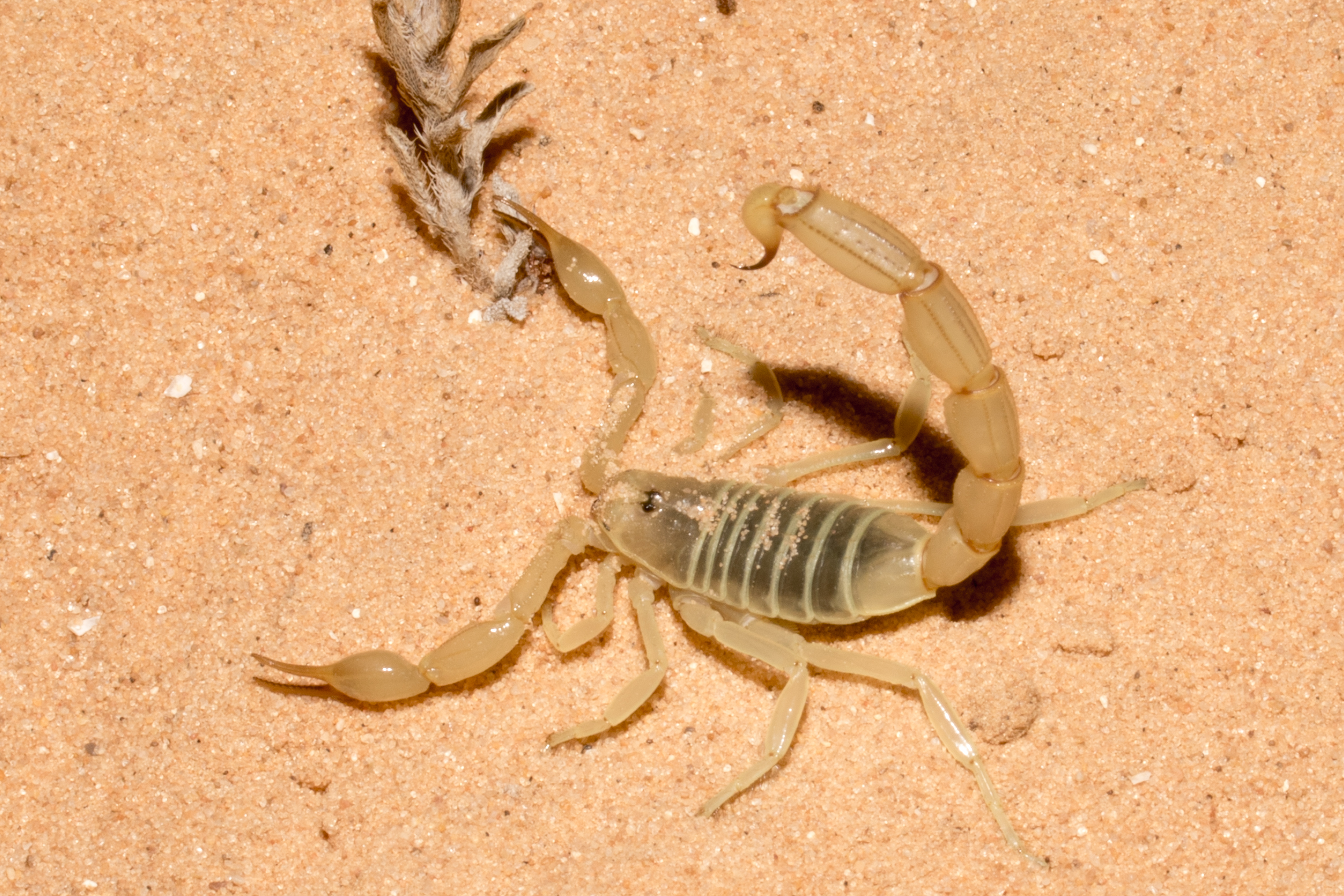
African fattail scorpion

Androctonus amoreuxi, the African fattail scorpion, is a species of scorpion found in Africa. In the Dogon Country of Mali, it is a common house scorpion.
