= DPP10 =

Protein-coding gene in the species Homo sapiens

Identifiers
- Aliases: DPP10, DPL2, DPPY, DPRP-3, DPRP3, dipeptidyl peptidase like 10
- External IDs: OMIM: 608209; MGI: 2442409; GeneCards: DPP10
Available structures
PDB	Ortholog search: PDBe RCSB
PDB	List of PDB id codes 4WJL

Gene location (Human)
Chr.	Chromosome 2 (human)
Band	2q14.1	Start	114,442,299 bp
Band	2q14.1	End	115,845,780 bp

Gene location (Mouse)
Chr.	Chromosome 1 (mouse)
Band	1|1 E2.3	Start	123,249,200 bp
Band	1|1 E2.3	End	124,773,776 bp
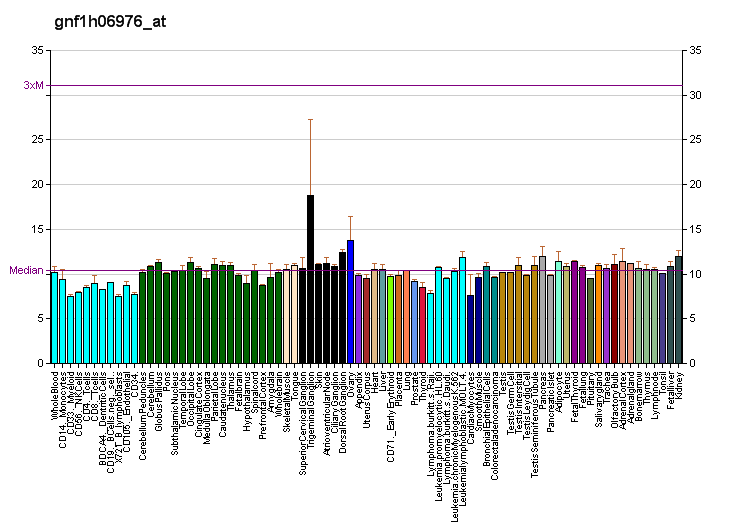

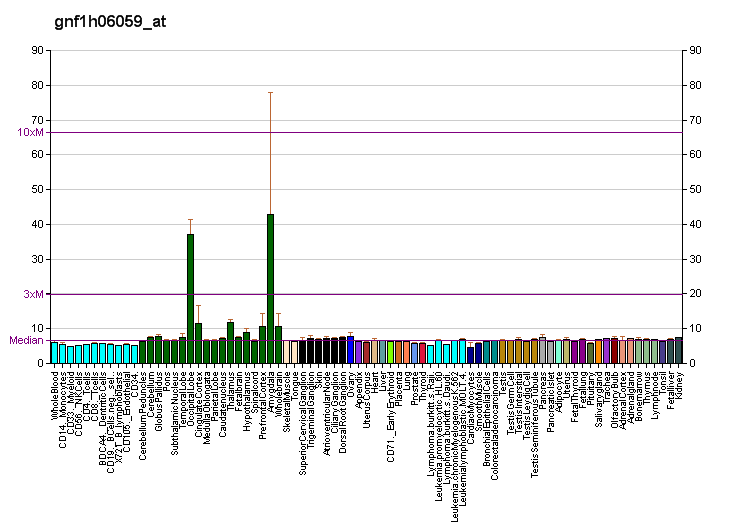
RNA expression pattern
Bgee	Human / Mouse (ortholog); Top expressed in: endothelial cell; Brodmann area 23; prefrontal cortex; dorsolateral prefrontal cortex; Brodmann area 9; Brodmann area 46; cingulate gyrus; anterior cingulate cortex; primary visual cortex; amygdala / Top expressed in: substantia nigra; piriform cortex; prefrontal cortex; temporal lobe; amygdala; primary motor cortex; cingulate gyrus; lateral septal nucleus; lobe of cerebellum; medial dorsal nucleus; More reference expression data
BioGPS	More reference expression data
Gene ontology
Molecular function	potassium channel regulator activity; serine-type peptidase activity; dipeptidyl-peptidase activity; transmembrane transporter binding
Cellular component	integral component of membrane; plasma membrane; membrane; voltage-gated potassium channel complex
Biological process	protein localization to plasma membrane; regulation of potassium ion transmembrane transport; proteolysis; positive regulation of protein localization to plasma membrane
Sources:Amigo / QuickGO
Orthologs
Databases	NCBI: entry; OMA: entry
Species	Human	Mouse
Entrez	57628	269109
Ensembl	ENSG00000175497	ENSMUSG00000036815
UniProt	Q8N608	Q6NXK7
RefSeq (mRNA)	NM_001004360; NM_001178034; NM_001178036; NM_001178037; NM_020868 NM_001321905; NM_001321906; NM_001321907; NM_001321908; NM_001321909; NM_001321910; NM_001321911; NM_001321912; NM_001321913; NM_001321914; NM_001399849; NM_001399850; NM_001399851	NM_199021
RefSeq (protein)	NP_001004360; NP_001171505; NP_001171507; NP_001171508; NP_001308834 NP_001308835; NP_001308836; NP_001308837; NP_001308838; NP_001308839; NP_001308840; NP_001308841; NP_001308842; NP_001308843; NP_065919	NP_950186; NP_001393353; NP_001393354; NP_001393355
Location (UCSC)	Chr 2: 114.44 – 115.85 Mb	Chr 1: 123.25 – 124.77 Mb
PubMed search
- Wikidata
View/Edit Human	View/Edit Mouse

Inactive dipeptidyl peptidase 10 is a protein that in humans is encoded by the DPP10 gene. Alternate transcriptional splice variants, encoding different isoforms, have been characterized.

== Function ==
This gene encodes a single-pass type II membrane protein that is a member of the S9B family in clan SC of the serine proteases. This protein has no detectable protease activity, most likely due to the absence of the conserved serine residue normally present in the catalytic domain of serine proteases. However, it does bind specific voltage-gated potassium channels and alters their expression and biophysical properties.

== Clinical significance ==
Mutations in this gene have been associated with asthma and autism spectrum disorders.
