= KCNC4 =

Protein found in humans

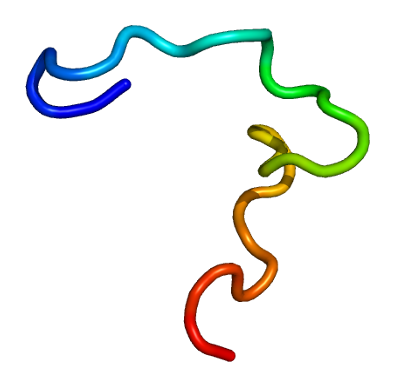

Identifiers
- Aliases: KCNC4, C1orf30, HKSHIIIC, KSHIIIC, KV3.4, potassium voltage-gated channel subfamily C member 4
- External IDs: OMIM: 176265; MGI: 96670; GeneCards: KCNC4
Available structures
| PDB | Ortholog search: PDBe RCSB |
| PDB | List of PDB id codes 1B4G, 1B4I, 1ZTN |

Gene location (Human)
| Chr. | Chromosome 1 (human) |
| Band | 1p13.3 | Start | 110,210,314 bp |
| Band | 1p13.3 | End | 110,283,100 bp |

Gene location (Mouse)
| Chr. | Chromosome 3 (mouse) |
| Band | 3 F2.3|3 46.83 cM | Start | 107,345,619 bp |
| Band | 3 F2.3|3 46.83 cM | End | 107,366,868 bp |
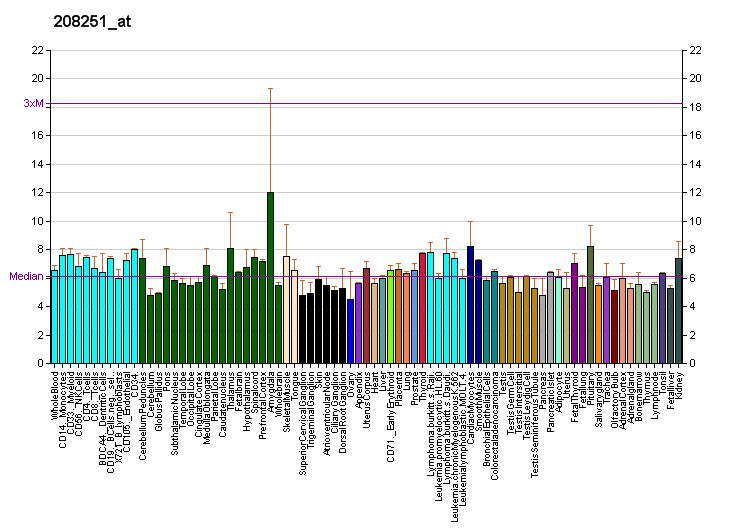
RNA expression pattern
| Bgee | Human / Mouse (ortholog); Top expressed in: right frontal lobe; cingulate gyrus; prefrontal cortex; anterior cingulate cortex; right hemisphere of cerebellum; amygdala; dorsolateral prefrontal cortex; Brodmann area 9; hypothalamus; gonad / Top expressed in: olfactory epithelium; motor neuron; vastus lateralis muscle; facial motor nucleus; muscle of thigh; triceps brachii muscle; tibialis anterior muscle; dentate gyrus of hippocampal formation granule cell; skeletal muscle tissue; masseter muscle; More reference expression data |
| BioGPS | More reference expression data |
Gene ontology
| Molecular function | ion channel activity; potassium channel activity; voltage-gated ion channel activity; voltage-gated potassium channel activity; delayed rectifier potassium channel activity; protein binding |
| Cellular component | plasma membrane; neuromuscular junction; axon terminus; voltage-gated potassium channel complex; membrane; integral component of membrane; axon; dendrite membrane; neuronal cell body membrane; soma |
| Biological process | chemical synaptic transmission; regulation of ion transmembrane transport; regulation of neurotransmitter secretion; protein homooligomerization; potassium ion transmembrane transport; potassium ion transport; ion transport; transmembrane transport |
Sources:Amigo / QuickGO
Orthologs
| Databases | NCBI: entry; OMA: entry |
| Species | Human | Mouse |
| Entrez | 3749 | 99738 |
| Ensembl | ENSG00000116396 | ENSMUSG00000027895 |
| UniProt | Q03721 | Q8R1C0 |
| RefSeq (mRNA) | NM_001039574; NM_004978; NM_153763; NM_001377330; NM_001377331 | NM_145922; NM_001356447 |
| RefSeq (protein) | NP_001034663; NP_004969; NP_001364259; NP_001364260 | NP_666034; NP_001343376 |
| Location (UCSC) | Chr 1: 110.21 – 110.28 Mb | Chr 3: 107.35 – 107.37 Mb |
| PubMed search |
- Wikidata
| View/Edit Human | View/Edit Mouse |

Potassium voltage-gated channel, Shaw-related subfamily, member 4 (KCNC4), also known as K_{v}3.4, is a human gene.

The Shaker gene family of Drosophila encodes components of voltage-gated potassium channels and comprises four subfamilies. Based on sequence similarity, this gene is similar to the Shaw subfamily. The protein encoded by this gene belongs to the delayed rectifier class of channel proteins and is an integral membrane protein that mediates the voltage-dependent potassium ion permeability of excitable membranes. It generates atypical voltage-dependent transient current that may be important for neuronal excitability. Several transcript variants encoding different isoforms have been found for this gene.

== See also ==
- Voltage-gated potassium channel
