= Discrepin =

Discrepin (α-KTx15.6) is a peptide from the venom of the Venezuelan scorpion Tityus discrepans. It acts as a neurotoxin by irreversibly blocking A-type voltage-dependent K^{+}-channels.

== Etymology and source ==
Discrepin is named after its source: a Venezuelan scorpion called Tityus discrepans. Its systematic number is α-KTx15.6.

== Chemistry ==
The subfamily α-KTx15 consists of 6 toxins. The first five toxins of this subfamily are very much alike, but discrepin only shares 50% amino acid homology with other members of this subfamily. Discrepin contains 38 amino acid residues. It has a polyglutamic acid at its N-terminal region. Discrepin has the α and β folds that are characteristic of scorpion toxins. It consists of one α-helix and three β-sheet helix strands. The α-helix is formed from amino acid Ser11 until Arg21. The three antiparallel β-sheets are formed from amino acid Ile2 until Lys7, Ala27 until Cys29 and Arg33 until Cys36.

== Target ==
Discrepin blocks voltage-gated Shal-type (Kv4.x) K^{+} channels in cerebellar granular cells. These A-type K^{+} channels regulate firing frequency, spike initiation and the waveform of action potentials. Discrepin has yet only been tested in cerebellar cells, however, Kv4.x family channels are in general highly expressed in the brain, heart and smooth muscles. Competition experiments showed that discrepin inhibits the binding of scorpion toxin BmTx3 to its receptor site, where other K^{+} channel blockers (Kv1-, Kv3.4-, Kv4.2/4.3 family blockers) were unable to compete with this toxin. These results support the hypothesis that discrepin can bind to a very specific and unique type of Kv4.x receptor channels. The residues of discrepin that are important for blocking these channels have not yet been clarified. However, it is clear that the N-terminal plays a role in the binding affinity. The stoichiometry of toxin binding to the potassium channel is 1:1.

== Mode of action ==
Discrepin specifically blocks the I_{A} currents (fast transient, low-voltage-activated currents) of voltage-dependent K+ channels. Inhibition of these K^{+} currents occurs in an irreversible manner, i.e. washing out of the toxin gives no recovery of the currents. The kinetics of the channel are not affected by discrepin and the blockage is independent of the holding potential.

== Toxicity ==
The half-effective dose (IC50) is 190 ± 30 nM.
