= BmTx3 =

Neurotoxin

BmTx3 is a neurotoxin, which is a component of the venom of the scorpion Buthus Martensi Karsch. It blocks A-type potassium channels in the central nervous system and hERG-channels in the heart.

== Source/Isolation ==
BmTx3 was originally purified from the venom of the Chinese scorpion, Buthus Martensi Karsch. BmTx3 is a “short-chain” peptide like other potassium channel blockers in the scorpion venom and added to the phylogenetic tree in the subfamily α-KTx15. Its 3D structure has not yet been elucidated, but based on sequence similarity it likely resembles the 3D structure of BmTx1 or Discrepin.

== Biochemistry ==
BmTx3 consists of an α-helix and two β-sheet segments cross-linked by three disulfide bridges (Cs-α/β motif). It is a short chain peptide with a molecular mass of 3751.6 Da; it consists of 37 amino acids.

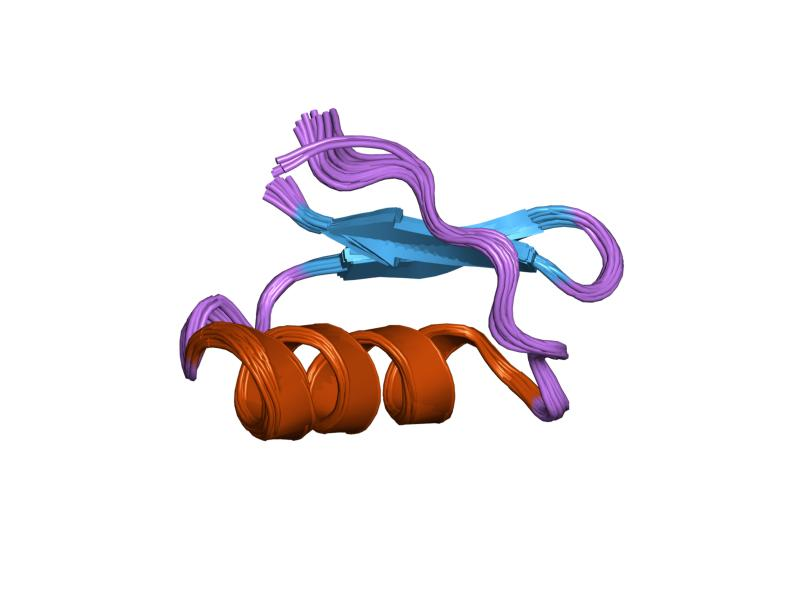
α/β motif of BmTx3

== Target ==
BmTx3 is the first toxin from the scorpion α-KTx subfamily 15 with two functional faces. As all α-KTx peptides, BmTx3 blocks A-type (I_{A}) potassium currents (K_{D} = 54 nM). BmTx3 blocks primarily the Kv4.x proteins and has a higher affinity for Kv4.1 channels than for Kv4.2 and Kv4.3 channels. The second functional face of BmTx3 blocks the hERG (human Ether-à-go-go) channel (K_{D} = 2 μM), a characteristic belonging to γ-KTx peptides. BmTx3 binding site seems essentially localized in neurons but could also be present in glial cells, endothelial cells and/or arterial smooth muscle cells. The distribution of BmTx3 binding sites is heterogeneous; a high density is found in the caudate–putamen and accumbens nucleus, thalamus, hippocampal formation and cerebellum.

== Mode of Action ==
The functional face of “short-chain” scorpion toxins is built of two important dyads (Lys and Tyr) on the β-sheet side. Lysine plugs deep into the channel pore and Tyrosine, as penultimate or ultimate and hydrophobic residue, turns it to fixate it, leading to a physical occlusion of the channel pore. This is supported by the finding that deletion of the two C-terminal residues (sBmTx3-delYP) results in loss of ability to block I_{A}-current.

The other functional face is thought to be situated at the α-helix-side and composed of Arg^{18} and Lys^{19}, like the functional face of other hERG toxins. It is known that α-KTx peptides use the β-sheet side to interact with the receptor, whereas γ-KTx peptides usually use their α-helix-side. As BmTx3 seems to use both sides to bind to different potassium channels, it might be an evolutionary transient between the two families.

== Toxicity ==
When injected into mice it causes epileptiform behavior. This might be due to its effect on A-type K^{+} channels, which, like the Kv4.x, are involved in action potential back propagation, firing frequency, spike initiation and action potential waveform determination. Blocking of the hERG channel can cause drug-induced long QT syndrome, arrhythmias and ventricular fibrillation which can result in death.
