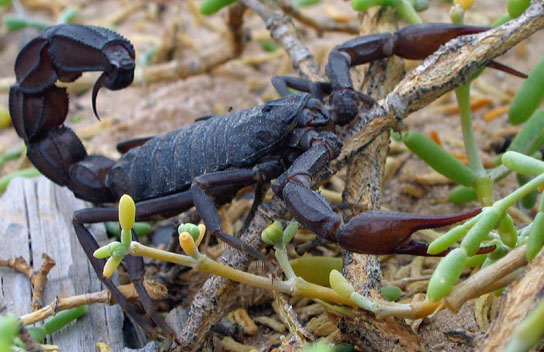
- Androctonus crassicauda, one of the fat-tailed scorpions.

Scientific classification
- Kingdom: Animalia
- Phylum: Arthropoda
- Subphylum: Chelicerata
- Class: Arachnida
- Order: Scorpiones
- Family: Buthidae
- Genus: Androctonus; Ehrenberg, 1828

Diversity
- Over 40 species

= Fattail scorpion =

Genus of scorpions

Fattail scorpion or fat-tailed scorpion is the common name given to scorpions of the genus Androctonus, one of the most dangerous groups of scorpion species worldwide. The genus was first described in 1828 by Christian Gottfried Ehrenberg.

Members of this genus are found throughout Northern Africa, the Middle East and eastwards to Northeastern India, more commonly in semi-arid and arid regions.

They are moderate sized scorpions, some attaining lengths of 10 cm (just under 4 inches). Their common name is derived from their distinctly fat metasoma, or tail, while the scientific name for the genus originates from Greek to mean "man killer". Their venom contains powerful neurotoxins, and their sting can have potent negative effects on domestic animals and people - even causing several human deaths each year. This has led several pharmaceutical companies to manufacture an antivenom for treatment of Androctonus envenomations.

== Ecology ==
The fat-tailed scorpion is nocturnal and hides in crevices during the day, which may also limit dehydration. Ongoing threats to the scorpions is through habitat loss by human development of their habitat.

== Geographic range ==
Androctonus is widespread in North and West Africa, the Middle East and eastwards to the Hindukush region. Countries where Androctonus occur include (from East to West): Senegal, Mauritania, Western Sahara, (Mali?), Burkina Faso, Togo, Morocco, Algeria, Niger, Cameroon, Tunisia, Libya, Chad, Egypt, Sudan, Ethiopia, Israel, Palestine, Lebanon, Syria, Turkey, Armenia, Jordan, Saudi Arabia, Iraq, Kuwait, Yemen, Oman, Bahrain, Qatar, United Arab Emirates, Iran, Afghanistan, Pakistan, India.

=== Biogeographic subgroups ===
An overview of the diversity in Saudi Arabia was given in Alqahtani & Badry, 2021

== Taxonomy ==
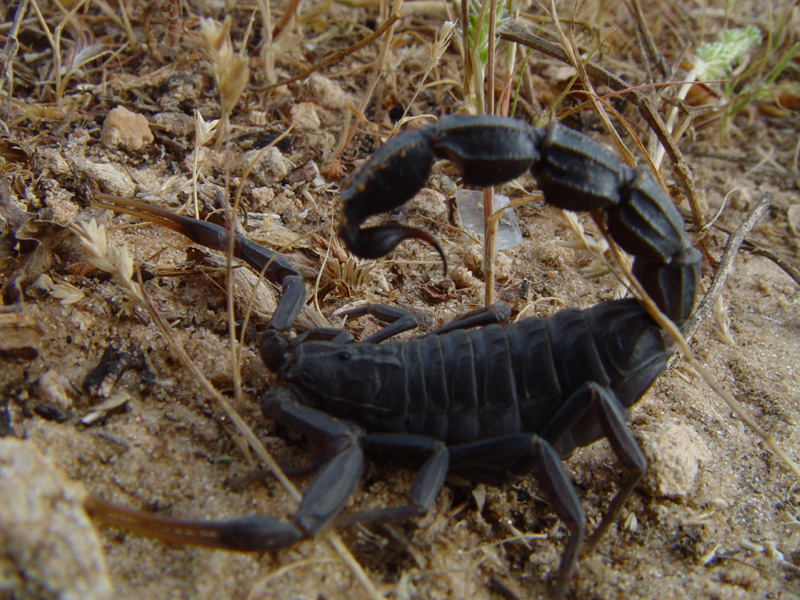
Androctonus bicolor: The Black fat-tailed scorpion, which has especially slim pedipalps compared to Androctonus crassicauda

The following checklist corresponds to The Scorpion Files (As of October 2025), counties and geographic ranges are adapted from Ythier 2021, and Ythier & Lourenço, 2022.

Genus Androctonus Ehrenberg, 1828:

- Androctonus aeneas C.L. Koch, 1839 – Algeria, Tunisia
- Androctonus afghanus Lourenço & Qi, 2006 – Afghanistan
- Androctonus agrab Ythier & Lourenço, 2022 – Western Sahara
- Androctonus ajjer Ythier, Sadine, Alioua & Lourenço, 2025 – Algeria
- Androctonus aleksandrplotkini Lourenço & Qi, 2007 – Mauritania
- Androctonus ammoneus Yagmur, Al-Saraireh & Abu Afifeh, 2025 – Jordan
- Androctonus amoreuxi (Audouin, 1826) – Western Sahara to Egypt (possibly Israel).
- Androctonus australis (Linnaeus, 1758) – Morocco to Egypt
- Androctonus baluchicus (Pocock, 1900) – Afghanistan, Pakistan
- Androctonus barbouri (Werner, 1932) – Morocco
- Androctonus bartolozzii Rossi & Merendino, 2016 – Pakistan
- Androctonus bicolor Ehrenberg, 1828 – Libya to Syria [possibly broader, e.g. Iraq (Jordan?, Lebanon?)]
- Androctonus bourdoni Vachon, 1948 – Morocco
- Androctonus burkinensis Ythier, 2021 – Burkina Faso
- Androctonus cacahuati Lourenço, 2023 – Cameroon
- Androctonus cholistanus Kovarik & Ahmed, 2013 – Pakistan, India
- Androctonus crassicauda (Olivier, 1807) – Iran (but a broader Middle eastern range in many publications, e.g. Ythier, 2021)
- Androctonus dekeyseri Lourenço, 2005 – Mauritania, Senegal
- Androctonus donairei Rossi, 2015 – Morocco
- Androctonus eburneus (Pallary, 1928) – Algeria
- Androctonus finitimus (Pocock, 1897) – Pakistan
- Androctonus gonneti Vachon, 1948 – Mauritania, Western Sahara, Morocco
- Androctonus hoggarensis (Pallary, 1929) – Algeria
- Androctonus ishtar Yağmur, Kachel, Al-Khazali, Al-Jubouri & Ali 2025 – Iraq
- Androctonus kunti Yağmur, 2023 – Turkey (Armenia?), (Iran?)
- Androctonus liouvillei (Pallary, 1924) – Algeria, Morocco
- Androctonus maelfaiti Lourenço, 2005 – India
- Androctonus maroccanus Lourenço, Ythier & Leguin, 2009 – Morocco
- Androctonus mauritanicus (Pocock, 1902) – Morocco
- Androctonus minaeus Abu Afifeh, Al-Saraireh & El-Hennawy, 2025 – Jordan
- Androctonus pallidus Lourenço, Duhem & Cloudsley-Thompson, 2012 – Chad
- Androctonus robustus Kovarik & Ahmed, 2013 – Pakistan
- Androctonus rostami Barahoei, Mirshamsi, Amiri, Moeinadin & Rakhshani, 2025 – Iran
- Androctonus santi Lourenço, 2015 – Niger
- Androctonus sergenti Vachon, 1948 – Morocco
- Androctonus simonettai Rossi, 2015 – Ethiopia
- Androctonus sistanus Barahoei & Mirshamsi, 2022 – Iran
- Androctonus sumericus Al-Khazali & Yağmur, 2023 – Iraq
- Androctonus tenuissimus Teruel, Kovarik & Turiel, 2013 – Egypt
- Androctonus tibesti Lourenço & El-Hennawy, 2022 – Libya
- Androctonus tigrai Lourenço, Rossi & Sadine 2015 – Ethiopia
- Androctonus tihamicus Alqahtani, Yağmur & Badry 2023 – Saudi Arabia
- Androctonus togolensis Lourenço, 2008 – Togo
- Androctonus tropeai Rossi, 2015 – Pakistan
- Androctonus turkiyensis Yağmur, 2021 – Turkey

== Etymology ==
An English translation of the name Androctonus is "man-killer", from the Ancient Greek anḗr, andrós (ἀνήρ, ἀνδρός), meaning "man" and kteínein (κτείνειν), meaning "to kill". The species name crassicauda loosely translates as "fat-tailed", from the Latin crassus meaning "fat" and cauda, meaning "tail", hence Androctonus crassicauda is "fat-tailed man-killer". Similarly, Androctonus australis has the species name australis from the Latin word for South, therefore "southern man-killer".

== In captivity ==
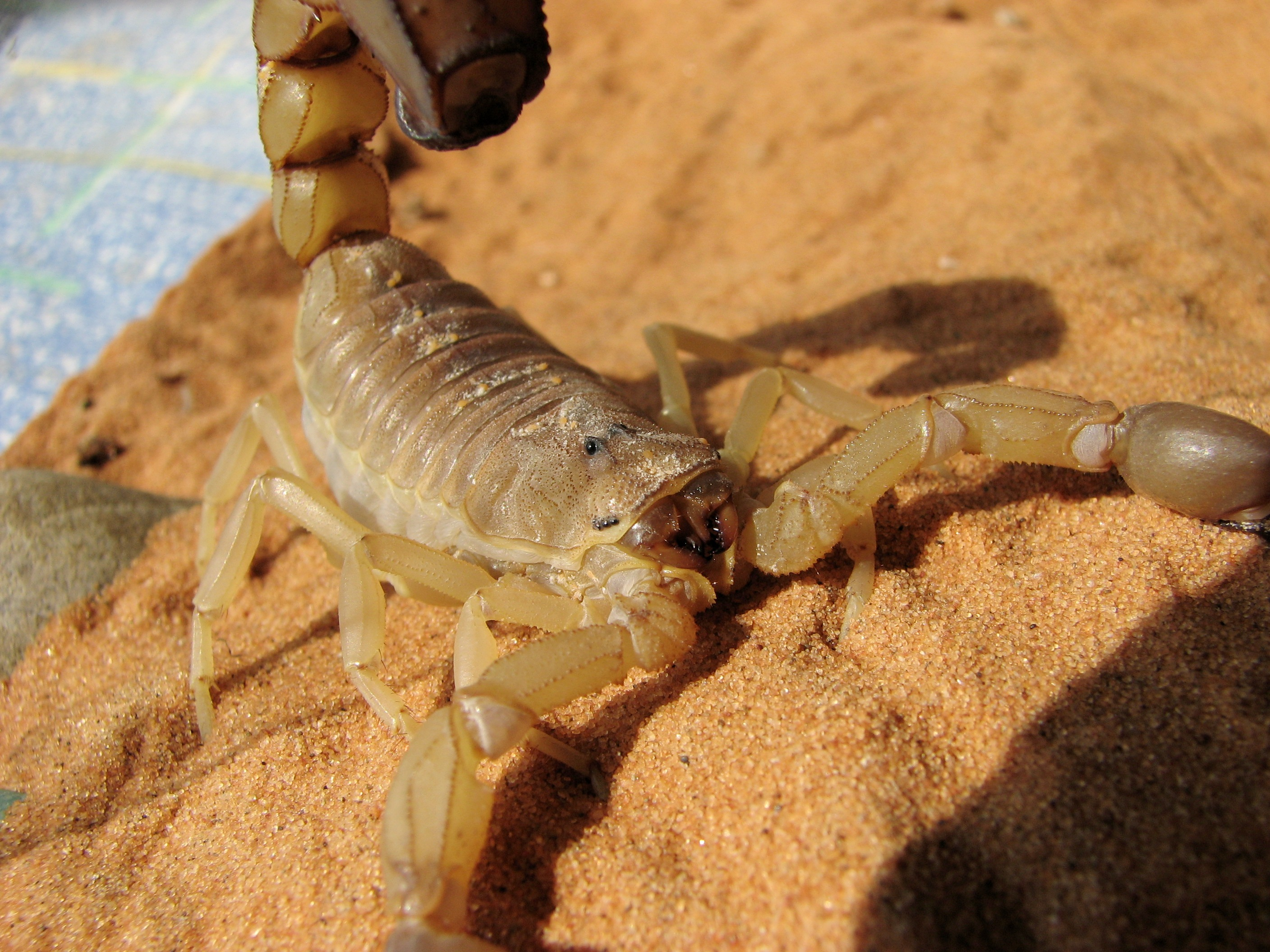
Androctonus australis in a terrarium with Saharan sand

Despite the risks of keeping such a dangerously venomous species in captivity, Androctonus scorpions are frequently found in the exotic animal trade, A. amoreuxi and A. australis being the most commonly available. The fat-tailed scorpion's main diet when in captivity consists of cockroaches, grasshoppers, and crickets. However, the fat-tailed scorpion is able to go months without consuming food. Scorpions will generally try to kill and eat anything which moves and is smaller than themselves. Fat-tail scorpions kill their prey by first crushing them with their pincers and then injecting them with venom from their stingers. Once the prey has been stung, it causes paralysis and allows the scorpion to consume it with ease. Interestingly, the fat-tail scorpion can only ingest liquids. To simulate the desert environment, the enclosure used to keep the scorpion in must be kept at a temperature of between 26 and 30 degrees Celsius (79–86 °F).
