= KCND3 =

Protein-coding gene in humans

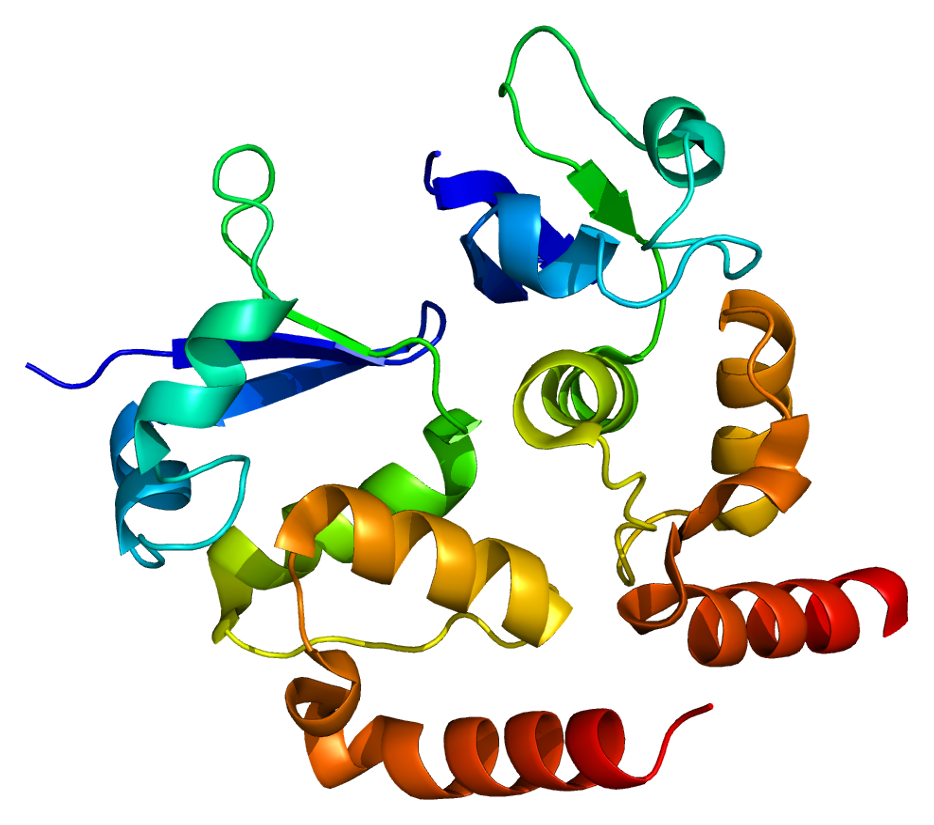

Identifiers
- Aliases: KCND3, KCND3L, KCND3S, KSHIVB, KV4.3, SCA19, SCA22, BRGDA9, potassium voltage-gated channel subfamily D member 3
- External IDs: OMIM: 605411; MGI: 1928743; GeneCards: KCND3
Available structures
PDB	Ortholog search: PDBe RCSB
PDB	List of PDB id codes 1S1G, 2NZ0

Gene location (Human)
Chr.	Chromosome 1 (human)
Band	1p13.2	Start	111,770,662 bp
Band	1p13.2	End	111,989,668 bp

Gene location (Mouse)
Chr.	Chromosome 3 (mouse)
Band	3|3 F2.2	Start	105,359,646 bp
Band	3|3 F2.2	End	105,581,318 bp
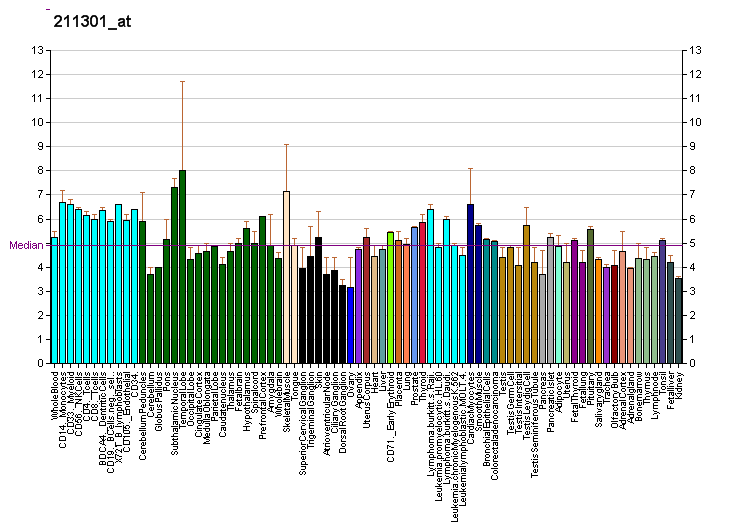

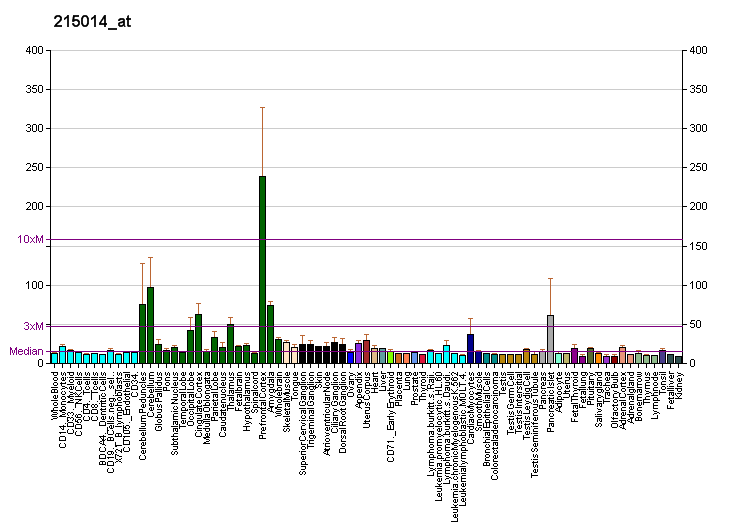

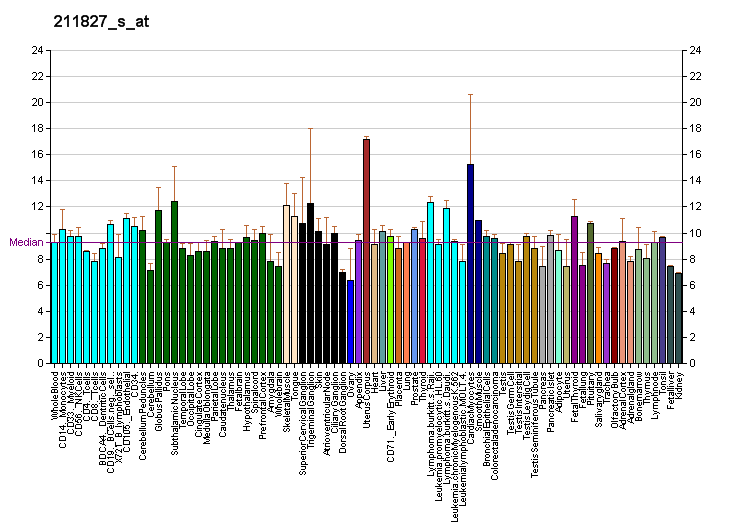
RNA expression pattern
Bgee	Human / Mouse (ortholog); Top expressed in: cerebellar vermis; pars reticulata; lateral nuclear group of thalamus; pars compacta; paraflocculus of cerebellum; Brodmann area 23; middle temporal gyrus; tail of epididymis; parietal lobe; caput epididymis / Top expressed in: substantia nigra; ventral tegmental area; lateral geniculate nucleus; medial geniculate nucleus; habenula; vas deferens; anterior amygdaloid area; subiculum; pineal gland; supraoptic nucleus; More reference expression data
BioGPS	More reference expression data
Gene ontology
Molecular function	potassium channel activity; transmembrane transporter binding; metal ion binding; voltage-gated ion channel activity; ion channel activity; protein binding; voltage-gated potassium channel activity; A-type (transient outward) potassium channel activity; voltage-gated potassium channel activity involved in cardiac muscle cell action potential repolarization; voltage-gated potassium channel activity involved in ventricular cardiac muscle cell action potential repolarization
Cellular component	integral component of membrane; cell projection; membrane; voltage-gated potassium channel complex; plasma membrane; dendrite; sarcolemma; GABA-ergic synapse; integral component of postsynaptic specialization membrane; soma
Biological process	regulation of ion transmembrane transport; ion transport; potassium ion transport; membrane repolarization; transmembrane transport; potassium ion transmembrane transport; protein homooligomerization; membrane repolarization during cardiac muscle cell action potential; regulation of heart rate by cardiac conduction; potassium ion export across plasma membrane; membrane repolarization during ventricular cardiac muscle cell action potential; ventricular cardiac muscle cell membrane repolarization; cardiac conduction
Sources:Amigo / QuickGO
Orthologs
Databases	NCBI: entry; OMA: entry
Species	Human	Mouse
Entrez	3752	56543
Ensembl	ENSG00000171385	ENSMUSG00000040896
UniProt	Q9UK17	Q9Z0V1
RefSeq (mRNA)	NM_004980; NM_172198; NM_001378969; NM_001378970	NM_001039347; NM_019931
RefSeq (protein)	NP_004971; NP_751948; NP_001365898; NP_001365899	NP_001034436; NP_064315
Location (UCSC)	Chr 1: 111.77 – 111.99 Mb	Chr 3: 105.36 – 105.58 Mb
PubMed search
- Wikidata
View/Edit Human	View/Edit Mouse

Potassium voltage-gated channel subfamily D member 3 also known as K_{v}4.3 is a protein that in humans is encoded by the KCND3 gene. It contributes to the cardiac transient outward potassium current (I_{to1}), the main contributing current to the repolarizing phase 1 of the cardiac action potential.

== Function ==
Voltage-gated potassium (K_{v}) channels represent the most complex class of voltage-gated ion channels from both functional and structural standpoints. Their diverse functions include regulating neurotransmitter release, heart rate, insulin secretion, neuronal excitability, epithelial electrolyte transport, smooth muscle contraction, and cell volume. Four sequence-related potassium channel genes – shaker, shaw, shab, and shal – have been identified in Drosophila, and each has been shown to have human homolog(s).

K_{v}4.3 is a member of the potassium channel, voltage-gated, shal-related subfamily, members of which form voltage-activated A-type potassium ion channels and are prominent in the repolarization phase of the action potential. This member includes two isoforms with different sizes, which are encoded by alternatively spliced transcript variants of this gene.

== Clinical significance ==
Gain of function is believed to cause Brugada syndrome although only indirectly shown by mutations in the beta subunit KCNE3 which causes gain of function of K_{v}4.3.

== See also ==
- Voltage-gated potassium channel
