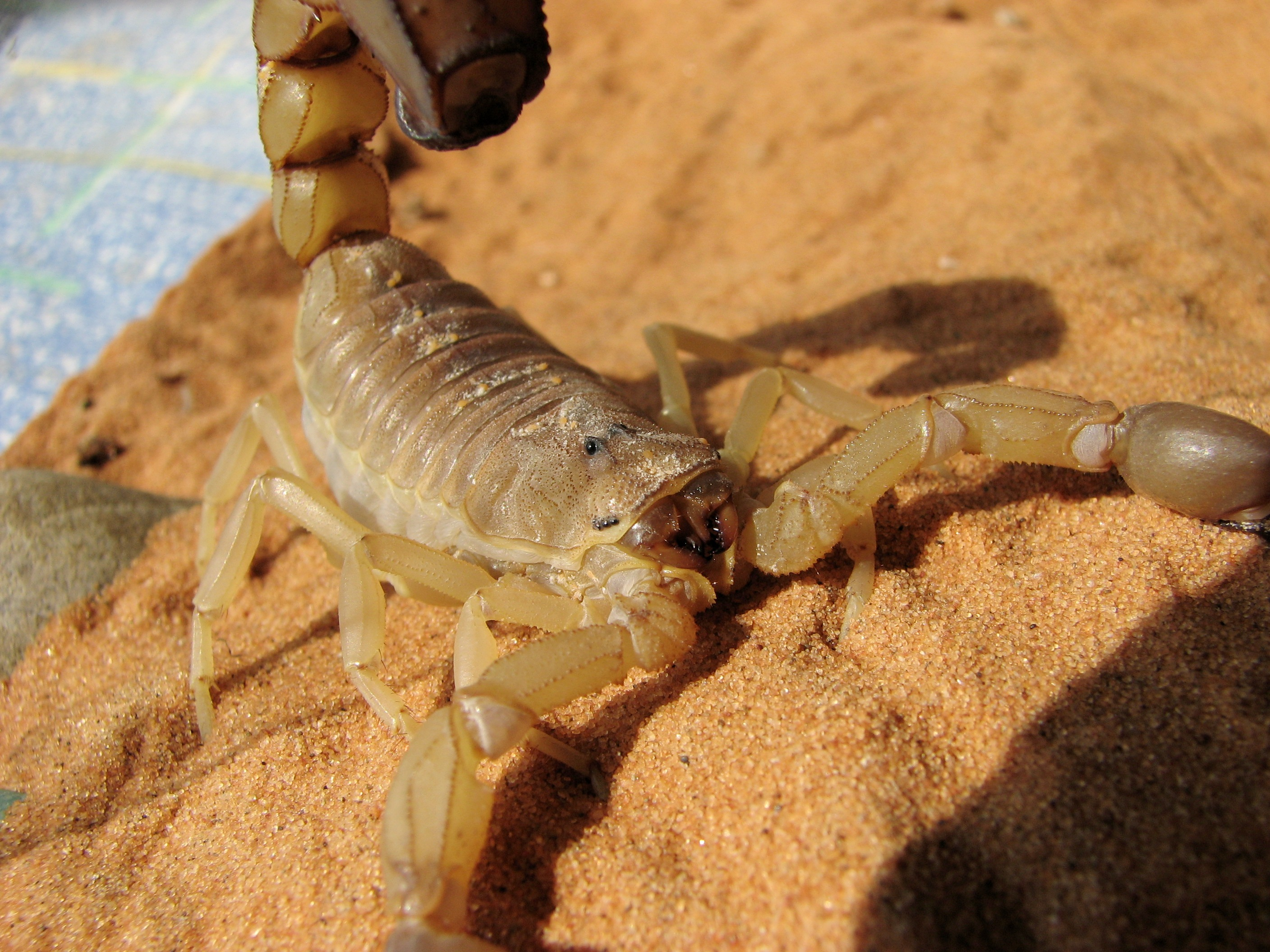

Scientific classification
- Kingdom: Animalia
- Phylum: Arthropoda
- Subphylum: Chelicerata
- Class: Arachnida
- Order: Scorpiones
- Family: Buthidae
- Genus: Androctonus
- Species: A. australis

Binomial name
- Androctonus australis (Linnaeus, 1758)

= Androctonus australis =

Species of scorpion

Androctonus australis, the yellow fat-tailed scorpion, is a hardy desert scorpion from North Africa. Older data indicated the species may have a broader distribution throughout the Middle East to India, but discredited in more recent studies which revise many generally similar allies from those regions as different species.

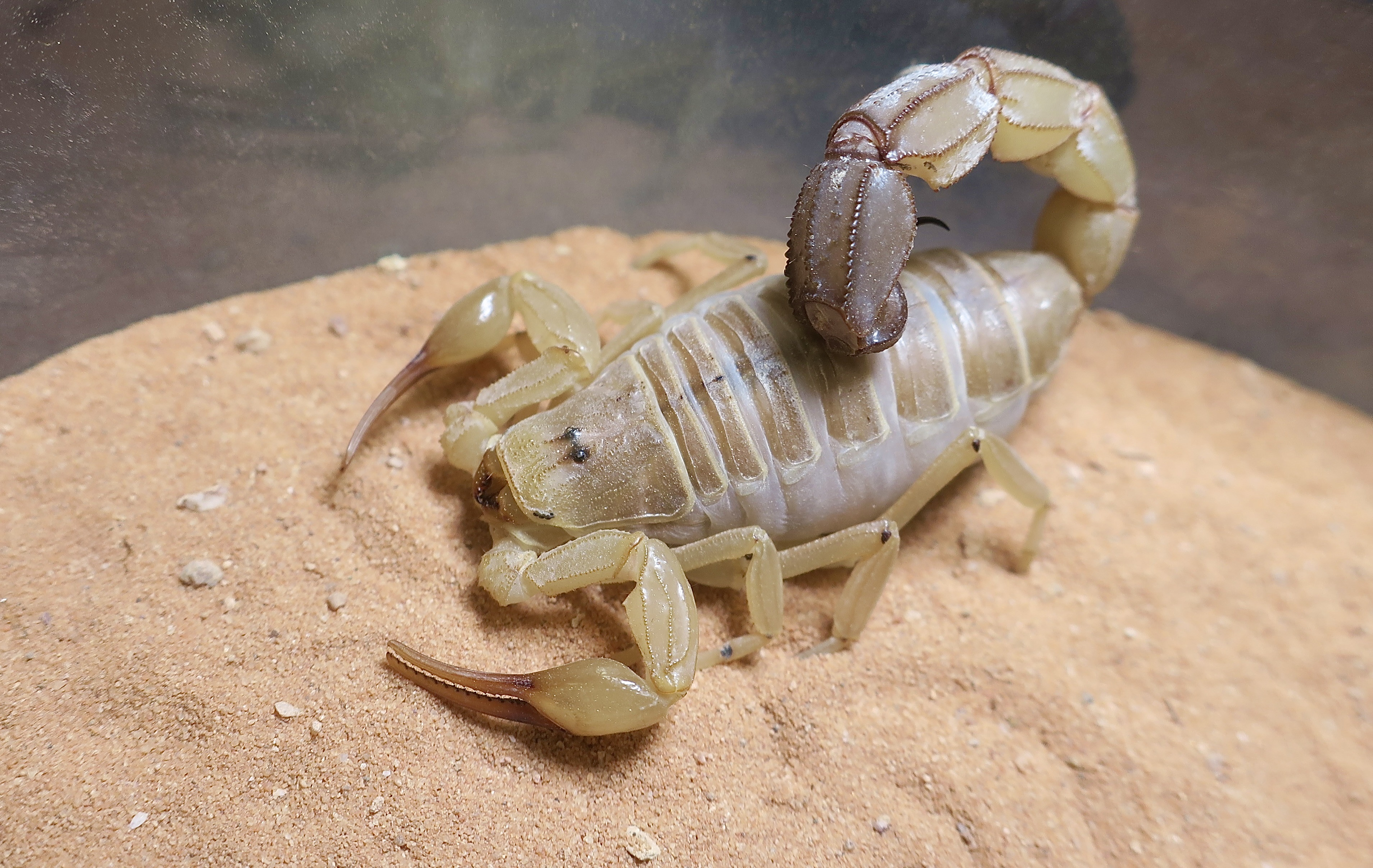
A yellow fat-tailed scorpion at 9th Island Reptiles, a store in Las Vegas.

== Hardiness ==
Unlike most other animals that live in deserts, Androctonus does not dig burrows to protect itself from a sandstorm. Instead, it can withstand sandstorms powerful enough to strip paint off steel, without any apparent damage. The resistance of Androctonus to sandstorms is suspected to be due to its unusual exoskeleton surface texture. Its armor is covered with dome-shaped granules that are 10 μm (0.0004 in) high and 25–80 μm (0.0010–0.0031 in) across. When this surface texture is translated into other materials it protects them to a certain degree as well, which has led to the possibility of the applicability of imitation surfaces in such objects as aeroplanes and helicopters.

== Etymology ==
The name Androctonus australis is derived from the Greek word Androctonus (roughly translated as "man-killer") and the Latin word australis (translated as "south") which together translate as "southern man-killer".

== Description and behavior ==
Androctonus australis is a medium-sized scorpion which can grow up to 10 centimeters in length. It has a very thick and powerful tail, and stripes on the sides of its dome for better vision while attacking another animal or for the use of self-defense. It is an animal of nocturnal habit, during the day it hides in humid and dark places, while the night goes out to hunt, it feeds on insects, small lizards and even small mammals. Cannibalism has been reported in this species. It is found mainly in deserts and arid places.

== Toxicity ==
Androctonus australis has very potent venom and is one of the world's most dangerous scorpions due to its relative toxicity and temperament. It claims several lives each year. It has the most potent venom of its kind, it is mainly composed of neurotoxins, cardiotoxins and myotoxins and additional hemotoxins, deaths in humans usually occur by heart and respiratory failure, sometimes by cerebral hemorrhage, organ dysfunction and shock. The LD_{50} for this species is 0.32 mg / kg subcutaneously.

The AaTX1 toxin was originally found in the venom of Androctonus australis.

== See also ==
- Fattail scorpion
