= Romano–Ward syndrome =

- Schematic representation of normal ECG trace (sinus rhythm), with waves, segments, and intervals labeled.
- Symptoms: Fainting, seizures
- Complications: Sudden death
- Causes: Mutations in the KCNQ1, KCNH2, and SCN5A genes
- Diagnostic method: EKG, Exercise test
- Treatment: Beta-adrenergic blockade
- Frequency: 0.03%

Romano–Ward syndrome is the most common form of congenital long QT syndrome (LQTS), a genetic heart condition that affects the electrical properties of heart muscle cells. Those affected are at risk of abnormal heart rhythms which can lead to fainting, seizures, or sudden death. Romano–Ward syndrome can be distinguished clinically from other forms of inherited LQTS as it affects only the electrical properties of the heart, while other forms of LQTS can also affect other parts of the body.

Romano–Ward syndrome is caused by abnormal variants in the genes responsible for producing certain proteins used to transport charged particles (ion channels) within the heart. These abnormalities interfere with the electrical signals that heart cells use to coordinate contractions, causing the heart to take longer to recharge in between beats. The condition is usually diagnosed using an electrocardiogram, but other tests sometimes used include Holter monitoring, exercise testing, and genetic testing. It may be treated using medications such as beta-blockers, an implantable cardioverter-defibrillator, or surgery to disrupt the sympathetic nervous system. Romano–Ward syndrome is estimated to affect 1 in every 7,000 people.

== Signs and symptoms ==
Romano–Ward syndrome increases the risk of abnormal heart rhythms or arrhythmias. These are typically a form of ventricular tachycardia known as Torsades de pointes which can cause faints, seizures, or even sudden death. Less dangerous arrhythmias such as atrial fibrillation also occur, causing symptoms of heart racing or palpitations. However, many of those with Romano–Ward syndrome will remain free from arrhythmias and therefore free from symptoms. Certain situations are more likely to precipitate arrhythmias such as exercise or mental stress in the LQT1 subtype, sudden loud noise in the LQT2 subtype, and during sleep or immediately upon waking in the LQT3 subtype.

Romano–Ward syndrome can be differentiated from other forms of long QT syndrome by Romano-Ward's sole involvement of the heart. While other forms of long QT syndrome are associated with deafness (Jervell and Lange-Nielsen syndrome), intermittent weakness and bone abnormalities (LQT7, Andersen–Tawil syndrome), and autism spectrum disorder (LQT8, Timothy syndrome), these extra-cardiac manifestations are not seen in Romano-Ward.

== Causes ==
Romano–Ward syndrome is a descriptive term for a group of subtypes of long QT syndrome, specifically subtypes LQT1-6 and LQT9-16. Several subtypes of Romano–Ward syndrome have been described based on the underlying genetic variant. These subtypes differ in clinical presentation and their response to treatment. There is robust evidence that the genetic variants associated with the three most common subtypes (LQT1, LQT2 and LQT3) are truly causative of the syndrome. However, there is uncertainty as to whether some of the other rarer subtypes are truly disease-causing by themselves or instead make individuals more susceptible to QT prolongation in response to other factors such as medication or low blood potassium levels (hypokalaemia).

=== LQT1 ===
LQT1 is the most common subtype of Romano–Ward syndrome, responsible for 30 to 35% of all cases. The gene responsible, KCNQ1, has been isolated to chromosome 11p15.5 and encodes the alpha subunit of the KvLQT1 potassium channel. This subunit interacts with other proteins (in particular, the minK beta subunit) to create the channel, which carries the delayed potassium rectifier current I_{Ks} responsible for the repolarisation phase of the cardiac action potential.

Variants in KCNQ1 cause the LQT1 subtype of Romano–Ward syndrome when a single copy of the variant is inherited (heterozygous, autosomal dominant inheritance). Loss-of-function mutations, commonly found in the voltage-sensing domain of the protein, often result in impaired trafficking to the cell surface at levels significantly lower than wild-type. These mutations have also been demonstrated to have a dominant-negative effect on wild-type protein trafficking, meaning that wild-type surface expression is impaired due to the existence of the non-functional protein. When two copies of the variant are inherited (homozygous, autosomal recessive inheritance) the more severe Jervell and Lange-Nielsen syndrome is found, associated with more marked QT prolongation, congenital sensorineural deafness, and a greater risk of arrhythmias.

LQT1 is associated with a high risk of faints but lower risk of sudden death than LQT2.

LQT1 may also affect glucose regulation. After ingesting glucose, those with LQT1 produce more insulin than would be expected, which is followed by a period of insulin resistance. When the resistance diminishes, abnormally low blood glucose levels (hypoglycaemia) are sometimes seen.

=== LQT2 ===
The LQT2 subtype is the second-most common form of Romano–Ward syndrome, responsible for 25 to 30% of all cases. This form of Romano–Ward syndrome is caused by variants in the KCNH2 gene on chromosome 7. KCNH2 (also known as hERG) encodes the potassium channel which carries the rapid inward rectifier current I_{Kr}. This current contributes to the terminal repolarisation phase of the cardiac action potential, and therefore the length of the QT interval.

=== LQT3 ===
The LQT3 subtype of Romano–Ward syndrome is caused by variants in the SCN5A gene located on chromosome 3p21-24. SCN5A encodes the alpha subunit of the cardiac sodium channel, Na_{V}1.5, responsible for the sodium current I_{Na} which depolarises cardiac cells at the start of the action potential. Cardiac sodium channels normally inactivate rapidly, but the mutations involved in LQT3 slow their inactivation leading to a small sustained 'late' sodium current. This continued inward current prolongs the action potential and thereby the QT interval.A large number of mutations have been characterized as leading to or predisposing to LQT3. Calcium has been suggested as a regulator of SCN5A protein, and the effects of calcium on SCN5A may begin to explain the mechanism by which some of these mutations cause LQT3. Furthermore, mutations in SCN5A can cause Brugada syndrome, cardiac conduction disease, and dilated cardiomyopathy. In rare situations, some individuals can have combinations of these diseases.

=== Other subtypes ===
LQT5 is caused by variants in the KCNE1 gene. This gene is responsible for the potassium channel beta subunit MinK which, in conjunction with the alpha subunit encoded by KCNQ1, is responsible for the potassium current I_{Ks,} and variants associated with prolonged QT intervals decrease this current. The same variants in KCNE1 can cause the more severe Jervell and Lange-Nielsen syndrome when two copies are inherited (homozygous inheritance) and the milder LQT5 subtype of Romano–Ward syndrome when a single copy of the variant is inherited (heterozygous inheritance).

The LQT6 subtype is caused by variants in the KCNE2 gene. This gene is responsible for the potassium channel beta subunit MiRP1 which generates the potassium current I_{Kr}, and variant that decrease this current have been associated with prolongation of the QT interval. However, subsequent evidence such as the relatively common finding of variants in the gene in those without long QT syndrome, and the general need for a second stressor such as hypokalaemia to be present to reveal the QT prolongation, has suggested that this gene instead represents a modifier to susceptibility to QT prolongation. Some, therefore, dispute whether variants in the gene are sufficient to cause Romano–Ward syndrome by themselves.

LQT9 is caused by variants in the membrane structural protein, caveolin-3. Caveolins form specific membrane domains called caveolae in which voltage-gated sodium channels sit. Similar to LQT3, these caveolin variants increase the late sustained sodium current, which impairs cellular repolarization.

LQT10 is an extremely rare subtype, caused by variants in the SCN4B gene. The product of this gene is an auxiliary beta-subunit (Na_{V}β4) forming cardiac sodium channels, variants in which increase the late sustained sodium current. LQT13 is caused by variants in GIRK4, a protein involved in the parasympathetic modulation of the heart. Clinically, the patients are characterized by only modest QT prolongation, but an increased propensity for atrial arrhythmias. LQT14, LQT15 and LQT16 are caused by variants in the genes responsible for calmodulin (CALM1, CALM2, and CALM3 respectively). Calmodulin interacts with several ion channels and its roles include modulation of the L-type calcium current in response to calcium concentrations, and trafficking the proteins produced by KCNQ1 and thereby influencing potassium currents. The precise mechanisms by which means these genetic variants prolong the QT interval remain uncertain.

Table of causative genes

Type	OMIM	Gene	Notes
LQT1	192500	KCNQ1	Encodes the α-subunit of the slow delayed rectifier potassium channel K_{V}7.1 carrying the potassium current I_{Ks}.
LQT2	152427	KCNH2	Also known as hERG. Encodes the α-subunit of the rapid delayed rectifier potassium channel K_{V}11.1 carrying the potassium current I_{Kr}.
LQT3	603830	SCN5A	Encodes the e α-subunit of the cardiac sodium channel Na_{V}1.5 carrying the sodium current I_{Na}.
LQT4	600919	ANK2	Encodes Ankyrin B which anchors the ion channels in the cell. Disputed true association with QT prolongation.
LQT5	176261	KCNE1	Encodes MinK, a potassium channel β-subunit.
LQT6	603796	KCNE2	Encodes MiRP1, a potassium channel β-subunit.
LQT9	611818	CAV3	Encodes Caveolin-3 responsible for forming membrane pouches known as caveolae. Mutations in this gene may increase the late sodium I_{Na}.
LQT10	611819	SCN4B	Encodes the β4-subunit of the cardiac sodium channel.
LQT11	611820	AKAP9	Encode A-kinase associated protein which interacts with K_{V}7.1.
LQT12	601017	SNTA1	Encodes syntrophin-α1. Mutations in this gene may increase the late sodium current I_{Na}.
LQT13	600734	KCNJ5	Also known as GIRK4, encodes G protein-sensitive inwardly rectifying potassium channels (K_{ir}3.4) which carry the potassium current I_{K(ACh)}.
LQT14	616247	CALM1	Encodes calmodulin-1, a calcium-binding messenger protein that interacts with the calcium current I_{Ca(L)}.
LQT15	616249	CALM2	Encodes calmodulin-2, a calcium-binding messenger protein that interacts with the calcium current I_{Ca(L)}.
LQT16	114183	CALM3	Encodes calmodulin-3, a calcium-binding messenger protein that interacts with the calcium current I_{Ca(L)}.

== Mechanism ==
KCNE2

In the Romano-Ward forms of Long QT syndrome, genetic mutations affect how positively-charged ions, such as potassium, sodium and calcium ions are transported in and out of heart cells. Many of these genes encode proteins which form or interact with ion channels. In cardiac muscle, these ion channels play critical roles in maintaining the heart's normal rhythm. Mutations in any of these genes alter the structure or function of channels, which changes the flow of ions between cells, a disruption in ion transport alters the way the heart beats, leading to abnormal heart rhythm characteristic of the syndrome.

The protein made by the ANK2 gene ensures that other proteins, particularly ion channels, are inserted into the cell membrane appropriately. A mutation in the ANK2 gene likely alters the flow of ions between cells in the heart, which disrupts the heart's normal rhythm and results in the features of Romano–Ward syndrome.

== Diagnosis ==
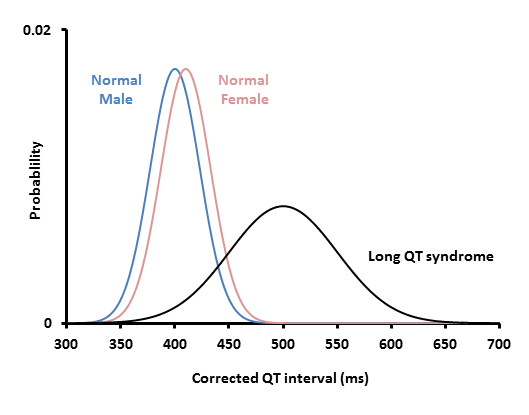
The normal range of QT intervals in the normal population and in those with Romano-Ward syndrome

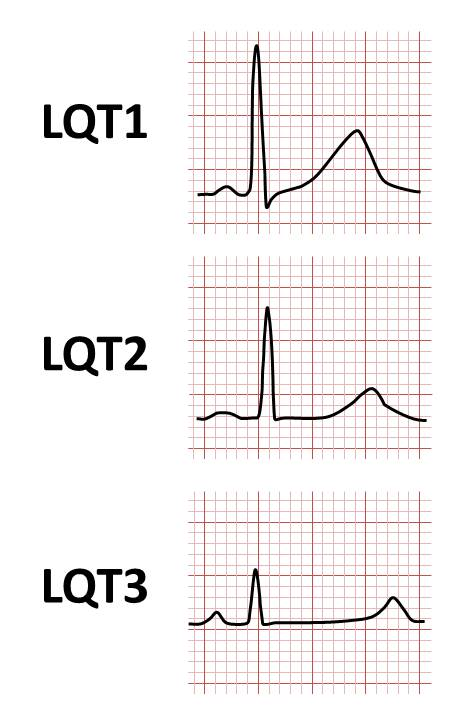
Characteristic T-wave patterns in the 3 major subtypes of Romano-Ward syndrome

Romano–Ward syndrome is principally diagnosed by measuring the QT interval corrected for heart rate (QTc) on a 12-lead electrocardiogram (ECG). Romano–Ward syndrome is associated with a prolonged QTc, although in some genetically proven cases of Romano–Ward syndrome this prolongation can be hidden, known as concealed Long QT syndrome. The QTc is less than 450 ms in 95% of normal males, and less than 460 ms in 95% of normal females. Romano–Ward syndrome is suggested if the QTc is longer than these cutoffs. However, as 5% of normal people also fall into this category, some suggest cutoffs of 470 and 480 ms for males and females respectively, corresponding with the 99th centiles of normal values.

The major subtypes of Romano–Ward syndrome are associated with specific ECG features. LQT1 is typically associated with broad-based T-waves, whereas the T-waves in LQT2 are notched and of lower amplitude, whilst in LQT3 the T-waves are often late onset, being preceded by a long isoelectric segment.

Other factors beyond the QT interval should be taken into account when making a diagnosis, some of which have been incorporated into scoring systems such as the Schwartz score. These factors include a history of characteristic abnormal heart rhythms (Torsades de Pointes), unexplained blackouts (syncope), and a family history of confirmed LQT syndrome. Other investigations that may suggest a diagnosis of the LQT1 form of Romano–Ward syndrome include paradoxical lengthening of the QT interval in response to exercise (QTc >470 ms at 2–4 minutes of recovery) or during an artificial infusion of adrenaline (lengthening of the absolute QT interval >30 ms during low dose adrenaline).

== Treatment ==
The treatment for Romano–Ward syndrome aims to reduce the risk of arrhythmias. Lifestyle measures include avoiding very strenuous or competitive exercise. Those with the LQT2 form of Romano–Ward syndrome should avoid sudden loud noises such as alarm clocks as these may trigger arrhythmias. Fevers should be treated promptly with paracetamol. Grapefruit juice should be avoided as it contains a chemical which decreases I_{Kr} and further prolongs the QT interval. Medications that further prolong the QT interval such as sotalol should be avoided, lists of which can be found in publicly accessible online databases.

Beta blockers such as propranolol or nadolol blunt the effects of adrenaline on the heart and thereby reduce the risk of arrhythmias. Mexiletine, flecainide and ranolazine decrease the late sodium current and are of particular use in the LQT3 form of Romano–Ward syndrome, and mexiletine may also be of benefit in other subtypes. Potassium supplements may be used at times when potassium is being lost such as when experiencing diarrhoea or vomiting, but medications that encourage the retention of potassium such as spironolactone or amiloride may also be required.

An implantable defibrillator, a small device that monitors the heart rhythm and can automatically deliver an electric shock to restart the heart, may be recommended. These devices are recommended for those with Romano–Ward syndrome who have experienced a cardiac arrest or a blackout whilst taking beta blockers. In those who experience recurrent arrhythmias despite medical therapy, a surgical procedure called sympathetic denervation can be used to interrupt the nerves that stimulate the heart.

== Epidemiology ==
Romano–Ward syndrome is the most common form of inherited long QT syndrome, affecting an estimated 1 in 7,000 people worldwide.

== See also ==
- Long QT syndrome
- Jervell and Lange-Nielsen syndrome
- Andersen-Tawil syndrome
- Timothy syndrome
