= Long QT syndrome =

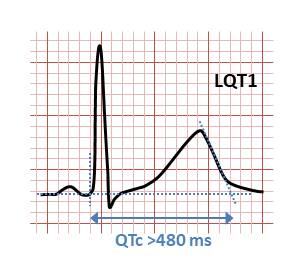
- An ECG showing a typical pattern of inherited Long QT syndrome (LQT1). A QT interval of >480 ms is considered abnormally long.
- Specialty: Cardiology
- Symptoms: Fainting, hearing loss, seizures
- Complications: Sudden death
- Causes: Genetic, certain medications, low blood potassium, low blood calcium, heart failure
- Risk factors: Family history of sudden death
- Diagnostic method: Electrocardiogram (EKG), clinical findings, genetic testing
- Differential diagnosis: Brugada syndrome, arrhythmogenic right ventricular dysplasia
- Treatment: Avoiding strenuous exercise, getting sufficient potassium, beta blockers, implantable cardiac defibrillator
- Frequency: ≈ 1 in 7,000
- Deaths: ≈3,500 a year (U.S.)

Long QT syndrome (LQTS) is a condition affecting repolarization (relaxing) of the heart after a heartbeat, giving rise to an abnormally lengthy QT interval. It results in an increased risk of an irregular heartbeat which can result in fainting, drowning, seizures, or sudden death. These episodes can be triggered by exercise or stress. Some rare forms of LQTS are associated with other symptoms and signs, including deafness and periods of muscle weakness.

Long QT syndrome may be present at birth or develop later in life. The inherited form may occur by itself or as part of a larger genetic disorder. Onset later in life may result from certain medications, low blood potassium, low blood calcium, or heart failure. Medications that are implicated include certain antiarrhythmics, antibiotics, and antipsychotics. LQTS can be diagnosed using an electrocardiogram (EKG) if a corrected QT interval of greater than 450–500 milliseconds is found, but clinical findings, other EKG features, and genetic testing may confirm the diagnosis with shorter QT intervals.

Management may include avoiding strenuous exercise, getting sufficient potassium in the diet, the use of beta blockers, or an implantable cardiac defibrillator. For people with LQTS who survive cardiac arrest and remain untreated, the risk of death within 15 years is greater than 50%. With proper treatment, this decreases to less than 1% over 20 years.

Long QT syndrome is estimated to affect 1 in 7,000 people. Females are affected more often than males. Most people with the condition develop symptoms before they are 40 years old. It is a relatively common cause of sudden death along with Brugada syndrome and arrhythmogenic right ventricular dysplasia. In the United States, it results in about 3,500 deaths a year. The condition was first clearly described in 1957.

== Signs and symptoms ==
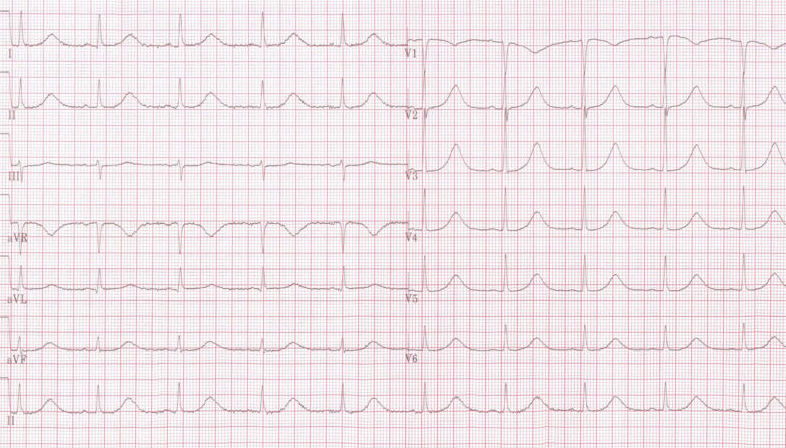
Acquired long QT syndrome

Many people with long QT syndrome have no signs or symptoms. When symptoms occur, they are generally caused by abnormal heart rhythms (arrhythmias), most commonly a form of ventricular tachycardia called Torsades de pointes (TdP). If the arrhythmia reverts to a normal rhythm spontaneously, the affected person may experience lightheadedness (known as presyncope) or faint. A fluttering sensation in the chest may precede fainting. If the arrhythmia continues, the affected person may experience a cardiac arrest, which, if untreated, may lead to sudden death. Those with LQTS may also experience non-epileptic seizures as a result of reduced blood flow to the brain during an arrhythmia. Epilepsy is also associated with certain types of long QT syndrome.

The arrhythmias that lead to faints and sudden death are more likely to occur in specific circumstances, in part determined by which genetic variant is present. While arrhythmias can occur at any time, in some forms of LQTS arrhythmias are more commonly seen in response to exercise or mental stress (LQT1), in other forms following a sudden loud noise (LQT2), and in some forms during sleep or immediately upon waking (LQT3).

Some rare forms of long QT syndrome affect other parts of the body, leading to deafness in the Jervell and Lange-Nielsen form of the condition, and periodic paralysis in the Andersen–Tawil (LQT7) form.

=== Risk for arrhythmias ===
While those with long QT syndrome have an increased risk of developing abnormal heart rhythms, the absolute risk of arrhythmias is very variable. The strongest predictor of whether someone will develop TdP is whether they have experienced this arrhythmia or another form of cardiac arrest in the past. Those with LQTS who have experienced syncope without an ECG having been recorded at the time are also at higher risk, as syncope in these cases is frequently due to an undocumented self-terminating arrhythmia.

In addition to a history of arrhythmias, the extent to which the QT is prolonged predicts risk. While some have QT intervals that are very prolonged, others have only slight QT prolongation, or even a normal QT interval at rest (concealed LQTS). Those with the longest QT intervals are more likely to experience TdP, and a corrected QT interval of greater than 500 ms is thought to represent those at higher risk. Despite this, those with only subtle QT prolongation or concealed LQTS still have some risk of arrhythmias. Overall, every 10 ms increase in the corrected QT interval is associated with a 15% increase in arrhythmic risk.

As the QT prolonging effects of both genetic variants and acquired causes of LQTS are additive, those with inherited LQTS are more likely to experience TdP if given QT prolonging drugs or if they experience electrolyte problems such as low blood levels of potassium (hypokalaemia). Similarly, those taking QT prolonging medications are more likely to experience TdP if they have a genetic tendency to a prolonged QT interval, even it this tendency is concealed. Arrhythmias occur more commonly in drug-induced LQTS if the medication in question has been rapidly given intravenously, or if high concentrations of the drug are present in the person's blood. The risk of arrhythmias is also higher if the person receiving the drug has heart failure, is taking digitalis, or has recently been cardioverted from atrial fibrillation. Other risk factors for developing torsades de pointes among those with LQTS include female sex, increasing age, pre-existing cardiovascular disease, and abnormal liver or kidney function.

== Causes ==
There are several subtypes of long QT syndrome. These can be broadly split into those caused by genetic mutations which those affected are born with, carry throughout their lives, and can pass on to their children (inherited or congenital long QT syndrome), and those caused by other factors which cannot be passed on and are often reversible (acquired long QT syndrome).

=== Inherited ===
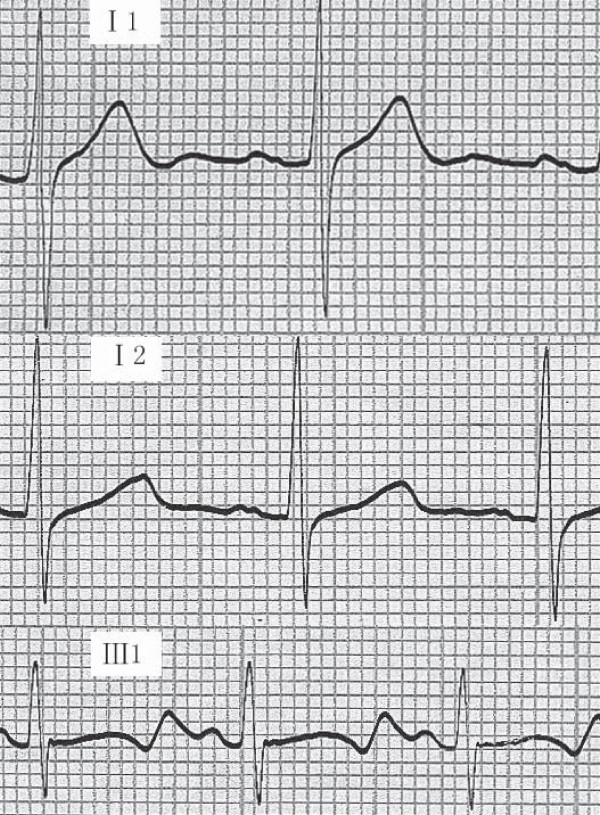
Electrocardiograms from a single family showing unaffected family member (top), Romano Ward syndrome (middle) and Jervell and Lange-Nielsen syndrome (bottom)

Genetic abnormalities cause inherited or congenital long QT syndrome. LQTS can arise from variants in several genes, leading in some cases to quite different features. The common thread linking these variants is that they affect one or more ion currents leading to prolongation of the ventricular action potential, thus lengthening the QT interval. Classification systems have been proposed to distinguish between subtypes of the condition based on the clinical features (and named after those who first described the condition) and subdivided by the underlying genetic variant.

The most common of these, accounting for 99% of cases, is Romano–Ward syndrome (genetically LQT1-6 and LQT9-16), an autosomal dominant form in which the electrical activity of the heart is affected without involving other organs. A less commonly seen form is Jervell and Lange-Nielsen syndrome, an autosomal recessive form of LQTS combining a prolonged QT interval with congenital deafness. Other rare forms include Andersen–Tawil syndrome (LQT7) with features including a prolonged QT interval, periodic paralysis, and abnormalities of the face and skeleton; and Timothy syndrome (LQT8) in which a prolonged QT interval is associated with abnormalities in the structure of the heart and autism spectrum disorder.

==== Romano–Ward syndrome ====
LQT1 is the most common subtype of Romano–Ward syndrome, responsible for 30 to 35% of all cases. The gene responsible, KCNQ1, has been isolated to chromosome 11p15.5 and encodes the alpha subunit of the KvLQT1 potassium channel. This subunit interacts with other proteins (in particular, the minK beta subunit) to create the channel, which carries the delayed potassium rectifier current I_{Ks} responsible for the repolarisation phase of the cardiac action potential.

Variants in KCNQ1 that decrease I_{Ks} (loss of function variants) slow the repolarisation of the action potential. This causes the LQT1 subtype of Romano–Ward syndrome when a single copy of the variant is inherited (heterozygous, autosomal dominant inheritance). Inheriting two copies of the variant (homozygous, autosomal recessive inheritance) manifests more severe Jervell and Lange–Nielsen syndrome. Conversely, variants in KCNQ1 that increase I_{Ks} lead to more rapid repolarisation and the short QT syndrome.

The LQT2 subtype is the second-most common form of Romano–Ward syndrome, responsible for 25 to 30% of all cases. It is caused by variants in the KCNH2 gene (also known as hERG) on chromosome 7 which encodes the potassium channel that carries the rapid inward rectifier current I_{Kr}. This current contributes to the terminal repolarisation phase of the cardiac action potential, and therefore the length of the QT interval.

The LQT3 subtype of Romano–Ward syndrome is caused by variants in the SCN5A gene located on chromosome 3p22–24. SCN5A encodes the alpha subunit of the cardiac sodium channel, Na_{V}1.5, responsible for the sodium current I_{Na} which depolarises cardiac cells at the start of the action potential. Cardiac sodium channels normally inactivate rapidly, but the mutations involved in LQT3 slow their inactivation leading to a small sustained 'late' sodium current. This continued inward current prolongs the action potential and thereby the QT interval. While some variants in SCN5A cause LQT3, other variants can cause quite different conditions. Variants causing a reduction in the early peak current can cause Brugada syndrome and cardiac conduction disease, while other variants have been associated with dilated cardiomyopathy. Some variants which affect both the early and late sodium current can cause overlap syndromes which combine aspects of both LQT3 and Brugada syndrome.

==== Rare Romano–Ward subtypes (LQT4-6 and LQT9-16) ====
LQT5 is caused by variants in the KCNE1 gene responsible for the potassium channel beta subunit MinK. This subunit, in conjunction with the alpha subunit encoded by KCNQ1, is responsible for the potassium current I_{Ks} which is decreased in LQTS. LQT6 is caused by variants in the KCNE2 gene responsible for the potassium channel beta subunit MiRP1 which generates the potassium current I_{Kr}. Variants that decrease this current have been associated with prolongation of the QT interval.

Subsequent evidence such as the relatively common finding of variants in the gene in those without long QT syndrome, and the general need for a second stressor such as hypokalaemia to be present to reveal the QT prolongation, has suggested that this gene instead represents a modifier to susceptibility to QT prolongation. Some therefore dispute whether variants in KCNE2 are sufficient to cause Romano-Ward syndrome by themselves.

LQT9 is caused by variants in the membrane structural protein, caveolin-3. Caveolins form specific membrane domains called caveolae in which voltage-gated sodium channels sit. Similar to LQT3, these caveolin variants increase the late sustained sodium current, which impairs cellular repolarization.

LQT10 is an extremely rare subtype caused by variants in the SCN4B gene. The product of this gene is an auxiliary beta-subunit (Na_{V}β4) forming cardiac sodium channels, variants in which increase the late sustained sodium current. LQT13 is caused by variants in GIRK4, a protein involved in the parasympathetic modulation of the heart. Clinically, the patients are characterized by only modest QT prolongation, but an increased propensity for atrial arrhythmias. LQT14, LQT15 and LQT16 are caused by variants in the genes responsible for calmodulin (CALM1, CALM2, and CALM3 respectively). Calmodulin interacts with several ion channels and its roles include modulation of the L-type calcium current in response to calcium concentrations, and trafficking the proteins produced by KCNQ1 and thereby influencing potassium currents. The precise mechanisms by which these genetic variants prolong the QT interval remain uncertain.

==== Jervell and Lange–Nielsen syndrome ====
Jervell and Lange–Nielsen syndrome (JLNS) is a rare form of LQTS inherited in an autosomal recessive manner. In addition to severe prolongation of the QT interval, those affected are born with severe sensorineural deafness affecting both ears. The syndrome is caused by inheriting two copies of a certain variant in the KCNE1 or KCNQ1 genes. The same genetic variants lead to the LQT5 and LQT1 forms of Romano-Ward syndrome if only a single copy of the variant is inherited. JLNS is generally associated with a higher risk of arrhythmias than most other forms of LQTS.

==== Andersen–Tawil syndrome (LQT7) ====
LQT7, also known as Andersen–Tawil syndrome, is characterised by a triad of features – in addition to a prolonged QT interval, those affected may experience intermittent weakness often occurring at times when blood potassium concentrations are low (hypokalaemic periodic paralysis), and characteristic facial and skeletal abnormalities such as a small lower jaw (micrognathia), low set ears, and fused or abnormally angled fingers and toes (syndactyly and clinodactyly). The condition is inherited in an autosomal-dominant manner. It is caused by mutations in the KCNJ2 gene which encodes the potassium channel protein K_{ir}2.1.

==== Timothy syndrome (LQT8) ====
LQT8, also known as Timothy syndrome, combines a prolonged QT interval with fused fingers or toes (syndactyly). Abnormalities of the structure of the heart are commonly seen including ventricular septal defect, tetralogy of Fallot, and hypertrophic cardiomyopathy. The condition presents early in life and the average life expectancy is 2.5 years with death most commonly caused by ventricular arrhythmias. Many children with Timothy syndrome who survive longer than this have features of autism spectrum disorder. Timothy syndrome is caused by variants in the calcium channel Cav1.2 encoded by the gene CACNA1c.

==== Table of associated genes ====
The following is a list of genes associated with Long QT syndrome:

Type	OMIM	Gene	Notes
LQT1	192500	KCNQ1	Encodes the α-subunit of the slow delayed rectifier potassium channel K_{V}7.1 carrying the potassium current I_{Ks}.
LQT2	152427	KCNH2	Also known as hERG. Encodes the α-subunit of the rapid delayed rectifier potassium channel K_{V}11.1 carrying the potassium current I_{Kr}.
LQT3	603830	SCN5A	Encodes the α-subunit of the cardiac sodium channel Na_{V}1.5 carrying the sodium current I_{Na}.
LQT4	600919	ANK2	Encodes Ankyrin B, which anchors the ion channels in the cell. Disputed whether it is truly disease-causing vs. a minor QT susceptibility gene.
LQT5	176261	KCNE1	Encodes MinK, a potassium channel β-subunit. Heterozygous inheritance causes Romano–Ward, homozygous inheritance causes Jervell and Lange–Nielsen syndrome.
LQT6	603796	KCNE2	Encodes MiRP1, a potassium channel β-subunit. Disputed whether it is truly disease-causing vs. a minor QT susceptibility gene.
LQT7	170390	KCNJ2	Encodes inward rectifying potassium current K_{ir}2.1 carrying the potassium current I_{K1}. Causes Andersen–Tawil syndrome.
LQT8	601005	CACNA1c	Encodes the α-subunit Ca_{V}1.2 of the calcium channel Cav1.2 carrying the calcium current I_{Ca(L).} Causes Timothy syndrome.
LQT9	611818	CAV3	Encodes Caveolin-3, responsible for forming membrane pouches known as caveolae. Mutations in this gene may increase the late sodium current I_{Na}.
LQT10	611819	SCN4B	Encodes the β4-subunit of the cardiac sodium channel.
LQT11	611820	AKAP9	Encodes A-kinase associated protein which interacts with K_{V}7.1.
LQT12	601017	SNTA1	Encodes syntrophin-α1. Mutations in this gene may increase the late sodium current I_{Na}.
LQT13	600734	KCNJ5	Also known as GIRK4, encodes G protein-sensitive inwardly rectifying potassium channels (K_{ir}3.4) which carry the potassium current I_{K(ACh)}.
LQT14	616247	CALM1	Encodes calmodulin-1, a calcium-binding messenger protein that interacts with the calcium current I_{Ca(L)}.
LQT15	616249	CALM2	Encodes calmodulin-2, a calcium-binding messenger protein that interacts with the calcium current I_{Ca(L)}.
LQT16	114183	CALM3	Encodes calmodulin-3, a calcium-binding messenger protein that interacts with the calcium current I_{Ca(L)}.

=== Acquired ===
Although long QT syndrome is often a genetic condition, a prolonged QT interval associated with an increased risk of abnormal heart rhythms can also occur in people without a genetic abnormality, commonly due to a side effect of medications. Drug-induced QT prolongation is often a result of treatment by antiarrhythmic drugs such as amiodarone and sotalol, antibiotics such as erythromycin, or antihistamines such as terfenadine. Other drugs which prolong the QT interval include some antipsychotics such as haloperidol and ziprasidone, and the antidepressant citalopram. Lists of medications associated with prolongation of the QT interval, such as the CredibleMeds database, can be found online.

Other causes of acquired LQTS include abnormally low levels of potassium (hypokalaemia) or magnesium (hypomagnesaemia) within the blood. This can be exacerbated following a sudden reduction in the blood supply to the heart (myocardial infarction), low levels of thyroid hormone (hypothyroidism), and a slow heart rate (bradycardia).

Anorexia nervosa has been associated with sudden death, possibly due to QT prolongation. The malnutrition seen in this condition can sometimes affect the blood concentration of salts such as potassium, potentially leading to acquired long QT syndrome, in turn causing sudden cardiac death. The malnutrition and associated changes in salt balance develop over a prolonged period, and rapid refeeding may further disturb the salt imbalances, increasing the risk of arrhythmias. Care must therefore be taken to monitor electrolyte levels to avoid the complications of refeeding syndrome.

Anti-Ro/SSA autoantibodies, characteristic of Sjögren's disease and systemic lupus erythematosus, can contribute to QT interval prolongation. These autoantibodies are capable of binding to ventricular potassium channels of the heart, thereby disrupting potassium current, which leads to prolongation of the QT interval. In patients with circulating anti-Ro/SSA autoantibodies, the QTc interval is longer than in patients without such antibodies. Also, in patients with circulating autoantibodies, the chance of detecting pathological QTc interval prolongation increases almost twofold.

Factors that prolong the QT interval are additive, meaning that a combination of factors (such as taking a QT-prolonging drug and having low levels of potassium) can cause a greater degree of QT prolongation than each factor alone. This also applies to some genetic variants, which by themselves only minimally prolong the QT interval but can make people more susceptible to significant drug-induced QT prolongation.

== Mechanisms ==
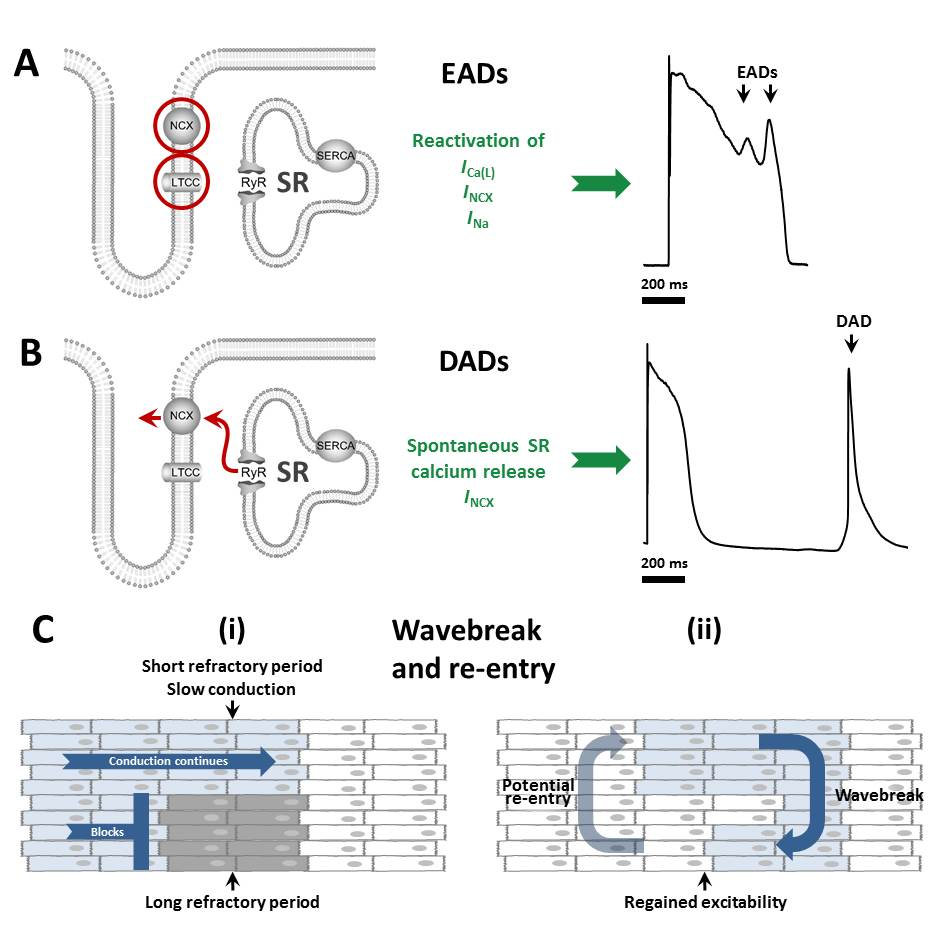
Cellular mechanisms leading to arrhythmias in long QT syndrome

The various forms of long QT syndrome, both congenital and acquired, produce abnormal heart rhythms (arrhythmias) by influencing the electrical signals that coordinate individual heart cells. The common theme is a prolongation of the cardiac action potential – the characteristic pattern of voltage changes across the cell membrane that occur with each heartbeat. Heart cells, when relaxed normally, have fewer positively charged ions on the inner side of their cell membrane than on the outer side, referred to as the membrane being polarised.

When heart cells contract, positively charged ions such as sodium and calcium enter the cell, equalising or reversing this polarity, or depolarising the cell. After a contraction has taken place, the cell restores its polarity (or repolarises) by allowing positively charged ions such as potassium to leave the cell, restoring the membrane to its relaxed, polarised state. In long QT syndrome, it takes longer for this repolarisation to occur, shown in individual cells as a longer action potential while being marked on the surface ECG as a long QT interval.

The prolonged action potentials can lead to arrhythmias through several mechanisms. The arrhythmia characteristic of long QT syndrome, torsades de pointes, starts when an initial action potential triggers further abnormal action potentials in the form of afterdepolarisations. Early afterdepolarisations (EADs), occurring before the cell has fully repolarised, are particularly likely to be seen when action potentials are prolonged, and arise due to reactivation of calcium and sodium channels that would normally switch off until the next heartbeat is due.

Under the right conditions, reactivation of these currents, facilitated by the sodium-calcium exchanger, can cause further depolarisation of the cell. The early afterdepolarisations triggering arrhythmias in long QT syndrome tend to arise from the Purkinje fibres of the cardiac conduction system. Early afterdepolarisations may occur as single events, but may occur repeatedly leading to multiple rapid activations of the cell.

Some research suggests that delayed afterdepolarisations (DADs), occurring after repolarisation has completed, may also play a role in long QT syndrome. This form of afterdepolarisation originates from the spontaneous release of calcium from the intracellular calcium store known as the sarcoplasmic reticulum, forcing calcium out of the cell through the sodium calcium exchanger in exchange for sodium, generating a net inward current.

While there is strong evidence that the trigger for torsades de pointes comes from afterdepolarisations, it is less certain what sustains this arrhythmia. Some lines of evidence suggest that repeated afterdepolarisations from many sources contribute to the continuing arrhythmia. Some suggest that the arrhythmia sustains through a mechanism known as re-entry. According to this model, the action potential prolongation occurs to a variable extent in different layers of the heart muscle, with longer action potentials in some layers than others.

In response to a triggering impulse, the waves of depolarisation will spread through regions with shorter action potentials but block in regions with longer action potentials. This allows the depolarising wavefront to bend around areas of block, potentially forming a complete loop and becoming self-perpetuating. The twisting pattern on the ECG can be explained by the movement of the core of the re-entrant circuit in the form of a meandering spiral wave.

== Diagnosis ==
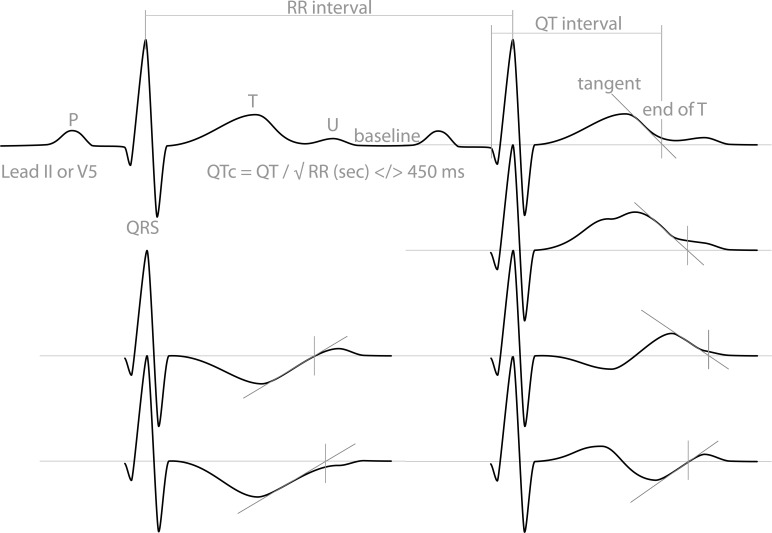
Measurement of the QT interval with normal and prolonged QT intervals

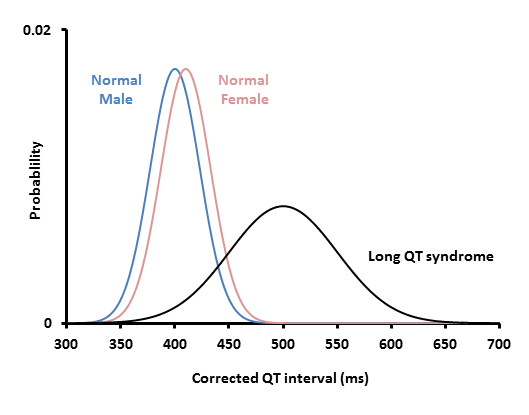
Range of QT intervals expected in healthy males, healthy females, and those with long QT syndrome

Diagnosing long QT syndrome is challenging. Whilst the hallmark of LQTS is prolongation of the QT interval, the QT interval is highly variable among both those who are healthy and those who have LQTS. This leads to overlap between the QT intervals of those with and without LQTS. 25% of those with genetically proven LQTS have a QT interval within the normal range.

Conversely, given the normal distribution of QT intervals, a proportion of healthy people will have a longer QT interval than any arbitrary cutoff. Other factors beyond the QT interval should therefore be taken into account when making a diagnosis, some of which have been incorporated into scoring systems.

=== Electrocardiogram ===
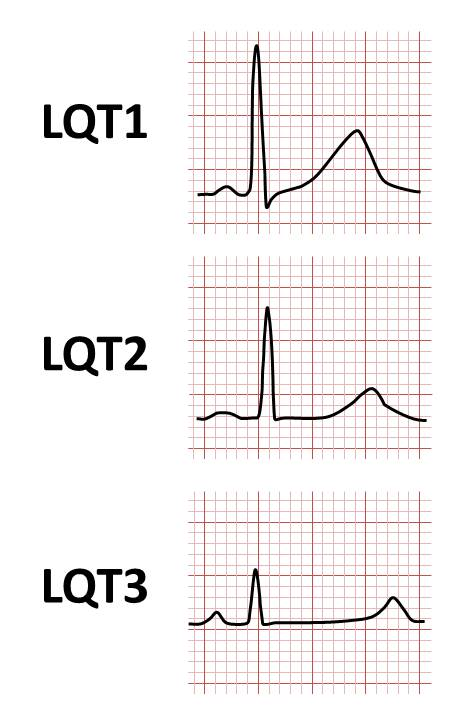
Characteristic ECG patterns associated with the three major subtypes of inherited Long QT syndrome

Long QT syndrome is principally diagnosed by measuring the QT interval corrected for heart rate (QTc) on a 12-lead electrocardiogram (ECG). Long QT syndrome is associated with a prolonged QTc, although in some genetically proven cases of LQTS, this prolongation can be hidden, known as concealed LQTS.

The QTc is less than 450 ms in 95% of normal males, and less than 460 ms in 95% of normal females. LQTS is suggested if the QTc is longer than these cutoffs. However, as 5% of normal people also fall into this category, some suggest cutoffs of 470 and 480 ms for males and females, respectively, corresponding with the 99th centiles of normal values.

The major subtypes of inherited LQTS are associated with specific ECG features. LQT1 is typically associated with broad-based T-waves, whereas the T-waves in LQT2 are notched and of lower amplitude, whilst in LQT3 the T-waves are often late onset, being preceded by a long isoelectric segment.

=== Schwartz score ===
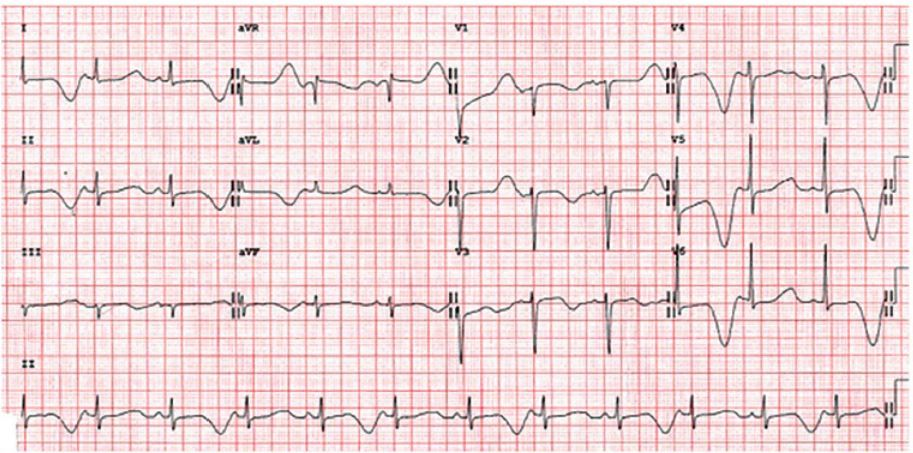
T-wave alternans in an individual with long QT syndrome

The Schwartz score has been proposed as a method of combining clinical and ECG factors to assess how likely an individual is to have an inherited form of LQTS. The table below lists the criteria used to calculate the score.

Schwartz score to aid diagnosis of inherited long QT syndrome.
Corrected QT interval (QTc)	≥ 480 ms	3 points	QTc defined according to Bazett's correction
Corrected QT interval (QTc)	460–470 ms	2 points	QTc defined according to Bazett's correction
Corrected QT interval (QTc)	450 ms and male gender	1 point	QTc defined according to Bazett's correction
Torsades de pointes		2 points	
T-wave alternans		1 point	
Notched T-waves in at least 3 leads		1 point	
Low heart rate for age (children)		0.5 points	
Syncope	with stress	2 points	Cannot receive points both for syncope and Torsades
Syncope	without stress	1 point	Cannot receive points both for syncope and Torsades
Congenital deafness		0.5 points	
Family history	Other family member with confirmed LQTS	1 point	Same family member cannot be counted for LQTS and sudden death
Family history	Sudden cardiac death in an immediate family member aged <30	0.5 point	Same family member cannot be counted for LQTS and sudden death
Score: 0–1: low probability of LQTS; 2–3: intermediate probability of LQTS; ≥ 4: high probability of LQTS

=== Other investigations ===
In cases of diagnostic uncertainty, other investigations may be helpful to unmask a prolonged QT. In addition to prolonging the resting QT interval, LQTS may affect how the QT changes in response to exercise and stimulation by catecholamines such as adrenaline. Provocation tests, in the form of exercise tolerance tests or direct infusion of adrenaline, can be used to detect these abnormal responses. These investigations are most useful for identifying those with concealed congenital Type 1 LQTS 1 (LQT1) who have a normal QT interval at rest. While in healthy persons the QT interval shortens during exercise, in those with concealed LQT1, exercise or adrenaline infusion may lead to paradoxical prolongation of the QT interval, revealing the underlying condition.

=== Guideline cutoffs ===
International consensus guidelines differ on the degree of QT prolongation required to diagnose LQTS. The European Society of Cardiology recommends that, with or without symptoms or other investigations, LQTS can be diagnosed if the corrected QT interval is longer than 480ms. They recommend that a diagnosis can be considered in the presence of a QTc of greater than 460 ms if unexplained syncope has occurred.

The Heart Rhythm Society guidelines are more stringent, recommending a QTc cutoff of greater than 500 ms in the absence of other factors that prolong the QT, or greater than 480 ms with syncope. Both sets of guidelines agree that LQTS can also be diagnosed if an individual has a Schwartz score of greater than 3 or if a pathogenic genetic variant associated with LQTS is identified, regardless of QT interval.

== Treatment ==
Those diagnosed with LQTS are usually advised to avoid drugs that can prolong the QT interval further or lower the threshold for TDP, lists of which can be found in public access online databases. In addition to this, two intervention options are known for individuals with LQTS: arrhythmia prevention and arrhythmia termination.

=== Arrhythmia prevention ===
Arrhythmia suppression involves the use of medications or surgical procedures that attack the underlying cause of the arrhythmias associated with LQTS. Since the cause of arrhythmias in LQTS is early afterdepolarizations (EADs), and they are increased in states of adrenergic stimulation, steps can be taken to blunt adrenergic stimulation in these individuals. These include administration of beta receptor blocking agents, which decreases the risk of stress-induced arrhythmias. Nadolol, a powerful non-selective beta blocker, has been shown to reduce the arrhythmic risk in all three main genotypes (LQT1, LQT2, and LQT3).

Genotype and QT interval duration are independent predictors of recurrence of life-threatening events.

- Sodium channel blocking drugs such as mexiletine have been used to prevent arrhythmias in long QT syndrome. While the most compelling indication is for those whose long QT syndrome is caused by defective sodium channels producing a sustained late current (LQT3), mexiletine also shortens the QT interval in other forms of long QT syndrome including LQT1, LQT2 and LQT8. As the predominant action of mexiletine is on the early peak sodium current, there are theoretical reasons why drugs which preferentially suppress the late sodium current, such as ranolazine, may be more effective. Evidence that this is the case in the real world is limited.
- Amputation of the cervical sympathetic chain (left stellectomy). This therapy is typically reserved for LQTS caused by JLNS, but may be used as an add-on therapy to beta blockers in certain cases. In most cases, modern therapy favors ICD implantation if beta-blocker therapy fails.
- In patients considered at high risk of life-threatening arrhythmic events, ICD implantation may be considered as a preventive step.

=== Arrhythmia termination ===
Arrhythmia termination involves stopping a life-threatening arrhythmia once it has already occurred. One effective form of arrhythmia termination in individuals with LQTS is placement of an implantable cardioverter-defibrillator (ICD). External defibrillation can be used to restore sinus rhythm. ICDs are commonly used in patients with fainting episodes despite beta-blocker therapy and in patients who have experienced a cardiac arrest. As mentioned earlier, ICDs may also be used in patients considered at high risk of life-threatening arrhythmic events.

=== New Treatments in Development ===
SGK1 has been shown to modulate cardiac ion channel function and surface expression in the heart. When activated, SGK1 acts on cardiac ion channels, and can result in adverse prolongation of the QT interval, a condition known as Long QT Syndrome (LQTS). SGK1 is involved in both congenital LQTS (caused by genetic mutations) and acquired (drug-induced) Long QT, both of which can lead to the development of lethal heart arrhythmias.

In LQTS, SGK1 inhibition addresses the underlying ion channel pathology responsible for abnormal electrical signaling. Unlike drugs that directly block ion channels and do not address the underlying pathology or involvement of multiple ion channels, SGK1 inhibition may address the underlying pathology due to electrical and structural remodeling of cardiomyocytes.

Clinical studies with SGK1 inhibitors are now underway.

https://clinicaltrials.gov/study/NCT07277582

With a better understanding of the genetics underlying LQTS, more precise treatments may become available.

== Outcomes ==
Genotype and QTc interval duration are the strongest predictors of outcome for patients with LQTS. 2022 European Society of Cardiology clinical practice guidelines have endorsed the use of independently validated risk score calculator, called 1-2-3-LQTS-Risk Calculator, which allows to calculate individual 5-year risk of life-threatening arrhythmic events.

For people who experience cardiac arrest or fainting caused by LQTS and who are untreated, the risk of death within 15 years is around 50%. With careful treatment, this decreases to less than 1% over 20 years. Those who exhibit symptoms before the age of 18 are more likely to experience a cardiac arrest.

== Epidemiology ==
Inherited LQTS is estimated to affect between one in 2,500 and 7,000 people.

== History ==
The first documented case of LQTS was described in Leipzig by Meissner in 1856, when a deaf girl died after her teacher yelled at her. Soon after being notified, the girl's parents reported that her older brother, also deaf, had previously died after a terrible fright. This was several decades before the ECG was invented, but is likely the first described case of Jervell and Lange-Nielsen syndrome. In 1957, the first case documented by ECG was described by Anton Jervell and Fred Lange-Nielsen, working in Tønsberg, Norway.

Italian pediatrician Cesarino Romano, in 1963, and Irish pediatrician Owen Conor Ward, in 1964, separately described the more common variant of LQTS with normal hearing, later called Romano-Ward syndrome. The establishment of the International Long-QT Syndrome Registry in 1979 allowed numerous pedigrees to be evaluated comprehensively. This helped in detecting many of the genes involved. Transgenic animal models of the LQTS helped define the roles of various genes and hormones involved, and recently experimental pharmacological therapies to normalize the abnormal repolarization in animals were published.
