= PKN =

PKN can mean:

- Pertti Kurikan Nimipäivät, a Finnish punk band
- A member of the protein kinase family of enzymes
  - PKN1, protein kinase N1
- Protestant Church in the Netherlands
- Personal knowledge networking
- Program Khidmat Negara, Malaysia's National Service program
- Palace of Culture and Science, the tallest building in Poland
- A variant version of the PK machine gun
- Iskandar Airport in Indonesia (IATA code)
- Polish Committee for Standardization, Polski Komitet Normalizacyjny
- Nusantara Awakening Party, an Indonesian political party
