= Jervell and Lange-Nielsen syndrome =

- Other names: Long QT interval-deafness syndrome
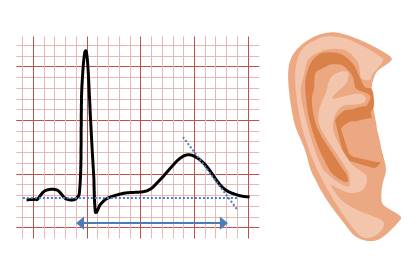
- The features of Jervell and Lange-Nielsen syndrome include a prolonged QT interval and sensorineural deafness
- Specialty: Cardiology
- Symptoms: Blackouts, seizures, sensorineural deafness
- Complications: Sudden death
- Usual onset: Congenital
- Causes: Genetic
- Differential diagnosis: Other forms of Long QT syndrome
- Treatment: Beta blockers, implantable cardioverter defibrillator
- Frequency: 0.0005%

Jervell and Lange-Nielsen syndrome (JLNS) is a rare type of long QT syndrome associated with severe, bilateral sensorineural hearing loss. Those with JLNS are at risk of abnormal heart rhythms called arrhythmias, which can lead to fainting, seizures, or sudden death. JLNS, like other forms of long QT syndrome, causes the cardiac muscle to take longer than usual to recharge between beats. It is caused by genetic variants responsible for producing ion channels that carry transport potassium out of cells. The condition is usually diagnosed using an electrocardiogram, but genetic testing can also be used. Treatment includes lifestyle measures, beta blockers, and implantation of a defibrillator in some cases. It was first described by Anton Jervell and Fred Lange-Nielsen in 1957.

== Symptoms and signs ==
Jervell and Lange-Nielsen syndrome causes severe sensorineural hearing loss from birth, affecting both ears. Those affected have a prolonged QT interval on an electrocardiogram and are at risk of abnormal heart rhythms (arrhythmias), which can cause dizziness, blackouts, or seizures. In general, JLNS affects the heart more severely than other forms of long QT syndrome. 90% of those with JLNS experience arrhythmias, with 50% becoming symptomatic by the age of 3. In some cases, these arrhythmias lead to sudden death.

== Genetics ==
Jervell and Lange-Nielsen syndrome is inherited in an autosomal recessive manner

Jervell and Lange-Nielsen syndrome is caused by mutations in the KCNE1 and KCNQ1 genes. The proteins produced by these two genes work together to form a potassium channel that transports positively charged potassium ions out of cells, which is called the slow delayed rectifier potassium current. The movement of potassium ions through these channels is critical for maintaining the normal functions of the inner ear and cardiac muscle. JLNS is an autosomal recessive disorder meaning that two copies of the genetic mutation are required to produce the full syndrome. Mutations in the same genes can produce milder Romano-Ward forms of long QT syndrome if only a single copy of the genetic mutation has been inherited.

About 90% of cases of Jervell and Lange-Nielsen syndrome are caused by mutations in the KCNQ1 gene, leading to Jervell and Lange-Nielsen syndrome type 1 (JLNS1). KCNE1 mutations are responsible for the remaining 10% of cases, causing Jervell and Lange-Nielsen syndrome type 2 (JLNS2). Mutations in these genes alter the usual structure and function of potassium channels or prevent the assembly of normal channels. These changes disrupt the flow of potassium ions in the inner ear and in cardiac muscle, leading to the hearing loss and irregular heart rhythm characteristic of Jervell and Lange-Nielsen syndrome.

Type	OMIM	Gene	Notes
JLNS1	192500	KCNQ1	Encodes the α-subunit of the slow delayed rectifier potassium channel K_{V}7.1 carrying the potassium current I_{Ks}.
JLNS2	176261	KCNE1	Encodes MinK, a potassium channel β-subunit.

== Diagnosis ==
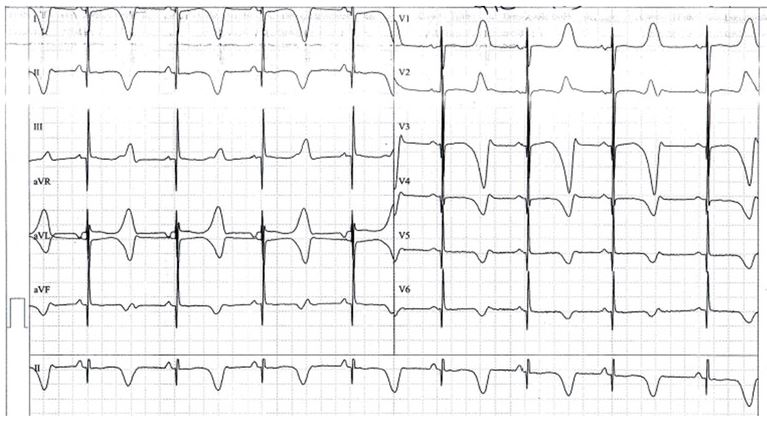
ECG from a 10-year-old boy with Jervell and Lange-Nielsen syndrome

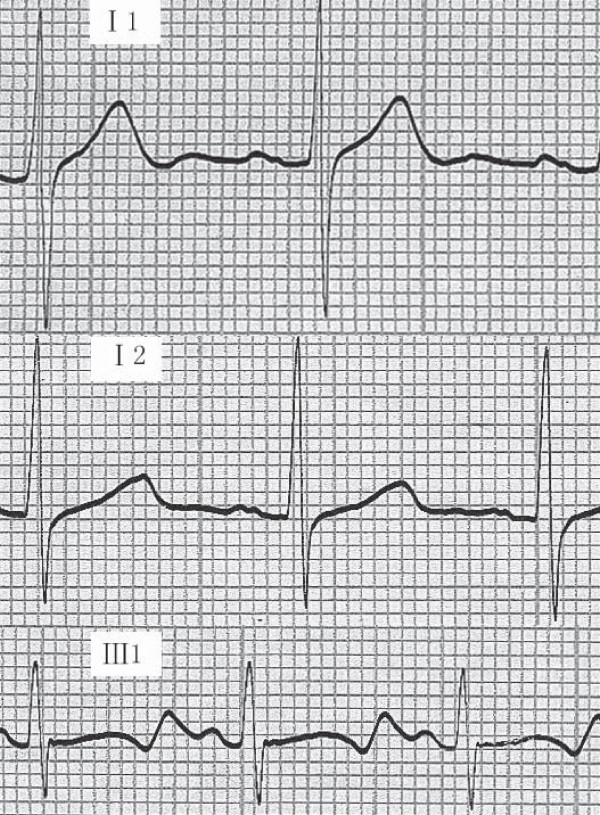
Comparison of ECGs from a single family showing unaffected family member (top), Romano-Ward syndrome (middle) and Jervell and Lange-Nielsen syndrome (bottom)

The sensorineural hearing loss in Jervell and Lange-Nielsen syndrome is present from birth and can be diagnosed using audiometry or physiological tests of hearing. The cardiac features of JLNS can be diagnosed by measuring the QT interval corrected for heart rate (QTc) on a 12-lead electrocardiogram (ECG). The QTc is less than 450 ms in 95% of normal males, and less than 460 ms in 95% of normal females. In those with Jervell and Lange-Nielsen syndrome the QTc is typically greater than 500 ms.

Other factors beyond the QT interval should be taken into account when making a diagnosis, some of which have been incorporated into scoring systems such as the Schwartz score. These factors include a history of characteristic abnormal heart rhythms (Torsades de Pointes), unexplained blackouts (syncope), and a family history of confirmed LQT syndrome. Genetic testing to identify variants in the KCNQ1 or KCNE1 genes can also be used.

== Treatment ==
The risk of arrhythmias can be reduced in several ways. Medications that further prolong the QT interval such as sotalol should be avoided, as should very strenuous or competitive exercise. Blood potassium levels should be kept within the normal range. Potassium supplements may be used at times when potassium is being lost such as when experiencing diarrhoea or vomiting, but medications that encourage the retention of potassium such as spironolactone or amiloride may also be required. Beta blockers such as propranolol or nadolol reduce the risk of arrhythmias.

An implantable defibrillator, a small device that monitors the heart rhythm and can automatically deliver an electric shock to restart the heart, may be used. These devices are recommended for those with JLNS who have experienced a cardiac arrest or a blackout whilst taking beta blockers. Due to the higher risk of arrhythmias associated with JLNS than other forms of long QT syndrome, a defibrillator may be considered even in those without any symptoms.

In those who experience recurrent arrhythmias despite medical therapy, a surgical procedure called sympathetic denervation can be used to interrupt the nerves that stimulate the heart.

== Prognosis ==
The risk of arrhythmias is higher for those with Jervell and Lange-Nielsen syndrome than other forms of long QT syndrome. Although this risk is dependent on the underlying genetic defect and degree of QT prolongation, without treatment more than 50% of those affected will die before the age of 15. However, treatment with beta blockers markedly reduces the risk of death, as does, in selected cases, implantation of a defibrillator.

== Epidemiology ==
Jervell and Lange-Nielsen syndrome affects an estimated one in 166,000 to 625,000 children, and is responsible for less than 10% of all cases of long QT syndrome. It has a markedly higher incidence in Norway and Sweden at up to one per 200,000.
