= PPEF1 =

Protein-coding gene in the species Homo sapiens

Identifiers
- Aliases: PPEF1, PP7, PPEF, PPP7C, PPP7CA, protein phosphatase with EF-hand domain 1
- External IDs: OMIM: 300109; MGI: 1097157; GeneCards: PPEF1
Enzyme activity
EC #	BRENDA	ExPASy	KEGG	MetaCyc
3.1.3.16	↗	↗	↗	↗

Gene location (Human)
Chr.	X chromosome (human)
Band	Xp22.13	Start	18,675,909 bp
Band	Xp22.13	End	18,827,921 bp

Gene location (Mouse)
Chr.	X chromosome (mouse)
Band	X F4|X 73.95 cM	Start	159,406,090 bp
Band	X F4|X 73.95 cM	End	159,518,761 bp
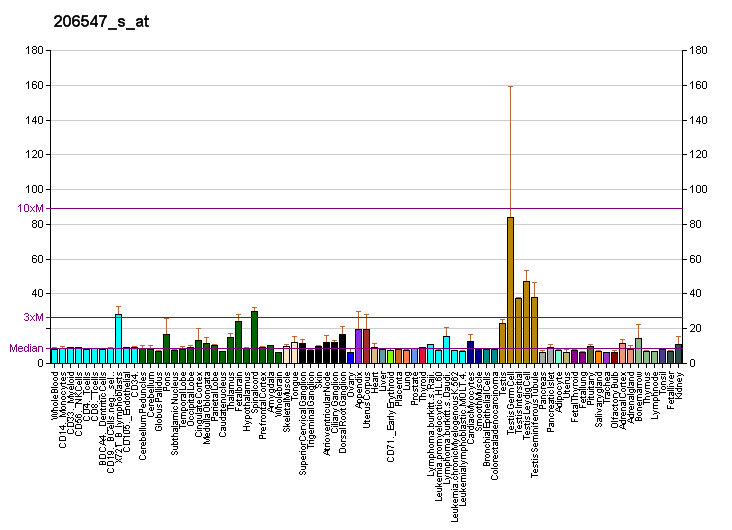
RNA expression pattern
Bgee	Human / Mouse (ortholog); Top expressed in: sperm; secondary oocyte; endothelial cell; spinal ganglia; testicle; left testis; right testis; C1 segment; prefrontal cortex; orbitofrontal cortex / Top expressed in: spermatid; secondary oocyte; zygote; testicle; primary oocyte; spermatocyte; spinal ganglia; embryo; embryo; ganglion of neuraxis; More reference expression data
BioGPS	More reference expression data
Gene ontology
Molecular function	iron ion binding; calcium ion binding; protein serine/threonine phosphatase activity; phosphoprotein phosphatase activity; manganese ion binding; hydrolase activity; metal ion binding; protein binding
Cellular component	cytosol; nucleus
Biological process	protein dephosphorylation; detection of stimulus involved in sensory perception; regulation of rhodopsin mediated signaling pathway
Sources:Amigo / QuickGO
Orthologs
Databases	NCBI: entry; OMA: entry
Species	Human	Mouse
Entrez	5475	237178
Ensembl	ENSG00000086717	ENSMUSG00000062168
UniProt	O14829	O35655
RefSeq (mRNA)	NM_006240; NM_152223; NM_152224; NM_152225; NM_152226 NM_001377986; NM_001377993; NM_001377994; NM_001377995; NM_001377996; NM_001378381; NM_001378382; NM_001389620; NM_001389621; NM_001389623; NM_001389624	NM_011147
RefSeq (protein)	NP_006231; NP_689410; NP_689412; NP_001364915; NP_001364922 NP_001364923; NP_001364924; NP_001364925; NP_001365310; NP_001365311	NP_035277
Location (UCSC)	Chr X: 18.68 – 18.83 Mb	Chr X: 159.41 – 159.52 Mb
PubMed search
- Wikidata
View/Edit Human	View/Edit Mouse

Serine/threonine-protein phosphatase with EF-hands 1 is an enzyme that in humans is encoded by the PPEF1 gene.

== Function ==
This gene encodes a member of the serine/threonine protein phosphatase with EF-hand motif family. The protein contains a protein phosphatase catalytic domain, and at least two EF-hand calcium-binding motifs in its C terminus. Although its substrate(s) is unknown, the encoded protein has been suggested to play a role in specific sensory neuron function and/or development. This gene shares high sequence similarity with the Drosophila retinal degeneration C (rdgC) gene. Several alternatively spliced transcript variants, each encoding a distinct isoform, have been described.

== Interactions ==
PPEF1 has been shown to interact with Calmodulin 1.
