= Fred Lange-Nielsen =

Norwegian doctor and jazz musician (1919–1989)

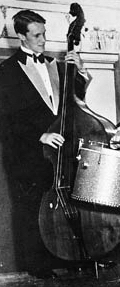

Fred Lange-Nielsen (28 September 1919 – 28 December 1989) was a Norwegian doctor and jazz musician (bass, vocals), known in the early Oslo music scene, and from several recordings.

Lange-Nielsen and Anton Jervell were the first to describe Jervell and Lange-Nielsen syndrome (JLNS) in 1953.

He played in String Swing (1937–1941), the quartet Hot Dogs, in Rowland Greenberg's orchestra (1941), the Oslo Swing Club's orchestra, the studio group Seven Cheerful and with Cecil Aagaard's "Swingsters" and quintet Sew-We-La (1950–1953).
