= Friedrich Ludwig Meissner =

German obstetrician and pediatrician

Friedrich Ludwig Meissner (25 August 1796, in Leipzig – 4 December 1860) was a German obstetrician, gynecologist and pediatrician.

He studied medicine in Leipzig, earning his PhD in 1819. From 1821, he taught classes at the University of Leipzig, becoming a professor of obstetrics and gynecology in 1831. In 1838, he founded an obstetrics clinic.

In 1856, he provided possibly the first account of long QT syndrome (LQTS), of which he described a case where a deaf girl collapsed and died while being publicly scolded at school.

== Selected writings ==
- Die Dislocationen der Gebärmutter und der Mutterscheide 1821-22 – Displacements of the uterus and the vagina.
- Forschungen des neunzehnten jahrhunderts im gebiete der Geburtshülfe, Frauenzimmer- und Kinderkrankheiten, 1826-33 – Research of the 19th century in the areas of obstetrics, women's and children's diseases.
- Die Kinderkrankheiten nach den neuesten Ansichten und Erfahrungen zum Untersicht für practische Arzte, 1832.
- Die Frauenzimmerkrankheiten nach den neuesten Ansichten und Erfahrungen zum Unterricht für praktische Aerzte, 1842-46 – Women's diseases according to the latest views and experiences on education for practicing physicians.
- Grundlage der Literatur der Pädiatrik, 1850.

Meissner was an active member of the Freemasons; in 1842 he started the German Masonic magazine Latomia.
