= CredibleMeds =

Online medication database

CredibleMeds is an online database launched in 2009 by the nonprofit Arizona Center for Education and Research (AZCERT), as part of its mission to improve the safe use of medications. The website has a special focus on drugs that prolong the QT interval on the ECG and thereby carry the risk of QT prolongation and torsades de pointes (TdP) ventricular arrhythmia.

== History ==
AZCERT maintains the CredibleMeds database. Founded in 2000 at the University of Arizona as part of a network of 14 federally funded CERTs, AZCERT became a separate nonprofit corporation in 2012, funded by the US Food and Drug Administration (FDA), research grants, and charitable contributions. AZCERT focuses on drugs and drug–drug interactions, especially those that cause QT prolongation and TdP, and provides its research and its lists of QT-prolonging drugs free of charge to the public, healthcare providers, and researchers for personal, professional, and noncommercial purposes. To maintain the independence of its work, AZCERT does not receive funding from companies that have a commercial interest in medications. In 2014, AZCERT’s website was renamed "CredibleMeds" to reflect its role as a global resource for safe medication use. In collaboration with the University of Arizona College of Medicine–Phoenix and Banner Health, AZCERT received an FDA Safe Use Initiative contract in 2014 to develop clinical decision support tools for safer prescribing of QT-prolonging antibiotics. This project produced an electronic alert system piloted in two Banner Health hospitals and an open-source API to link the QTdrugs database with hospital electronic health records throughout a network of 29 hospitals and clinics.

== Mobile app ==
AZCERT released the CredibleMeds mobile application for smartphones in January 2017, providing free access to the QTdrugs List and related resources via iOS and Android devices. The app is synced with the CredibleMeds database so that users can search for drugs and view up-to-date risk categories or a “Drugs to Avoid” list for patients with conditions like congenital Long QT syndrome. In April 2025, an enhanced version of the mobile app was launched with expanded features offered under tiered subscription plans. A Basic tier of the app is free to all CredibleMeds registrants, and Standard and Pro tiers with additional content can be purchased. The updated app’s tiers include advanced search tools, comprehensive QT risk information (such as each drug’s risk category and safer alternative medications), and real-time alerts when the QTdrugs List is revised. It is available on both Apple iOS and Android platforms and in multiple languages.

== Clinical-decision support ==
CredibleMeds’ QTdrugs database has been incorporated into clinical decision support systems to reduce the risk of drug-induced arrhythmias. Hospital networks including Banner Health and the Mayo Clinic have integrated CredibleMeds lists into their electronic health record (EHR) alert systems to identify patients at risk for TdP. The FDA’s Safe Use Initiative funded AZCERT in 2014 to create a clinical decision support system (CDSS) that would warn prescribers when a chosen antibiotic could pose serious QT-related cardiac risks. As part of this effort, AZCERT developed a tool to link the QTdrugs list with hospital EMRs and automatically flag high-risk scenarios for clinicians. A pilot program at Banner Health demonstrated this system by deploying the QT risk alerts in one hospital (compared to a control hospital) and tracking resulting safety interventions.

In 2020, AZCERT launched MedSafety Scan as a web-based clinical decision support platform open to all healthcare providers. MedSafety Scan allows clinicians to input a patient’s medications and health profile, then calculates a personalized “QT risk score” for TdP. If the risk is elevated, the system issues warnings about any QT-prolonging drugs, checks for potentially dangerous drug–drug interactions, and provides suggestions for risk mitigation (for example, switching to alternative medications with lower risk or increased monitoring of the patient’s ECG and electrolytes). During the COVID-19 pandemic, AZCERT made MedSafety Scan freely available worldwide to support providers treating high-risk COVID-19 patients with therapies like hydroxychloroquine and azithromycin, which carry QT prolongation hazards.

== Adverse drug event analysis ==
AZCERT developed the Adverse Drug Event Causality Analysis (ADECA) to evaluate drugs for their risk of causing QT prolongation and TdP. As part of its ADECA reviews, AZCERT includes drugs marketed outside the United States, especially in Europe, Japan, and Canada. In addition to their use to inform healthcare decision-making, CredibleMeds’ lists of drugs have been used in research published in more than 50 scientific articles.
