= Ranolazine =

Drug used to treat angina

Clinical data
- Trade names: Ranexa, Aspruzyo Sprinkle, Corzyna
- AHFS/Drugs.com: Monograph
- MedlinePlus: a606015
- License data: US DailyMed: Ranolazine
- Routes of administration: By mouth
- ATC code: C01EB18 (WHO)

Legal status
- Legal status: AU: S4 (Prescription only); CA: ℞-only; US: ℞-only; EU: Rx-only

Pharmacokinetic data
- Bioavailability: 35 to 50%
- Protein binding: ~62%
- Metabolism: Extensive in liver (CYP3A, CYP2D6) and intestine
- Elimination half-life: 1.4 to 1.9 hours
- Excretion: Kidney (75%) and fecal (25%)

Identifiers
- IUPAC name: (RS)-N-(2,6-Dimethylphenyl)-2-[4-[2-hydroxy-3-(2-methoxyphenoxy)-propyl]piperazin-1-yl]acetamide
- CAS Number: 95635-55-5
- PubChem CID: 56959
- IUPHAR/BPS: 7291
- DrugBank: DB00243
- ChemSpider: 51354
- UNII: A6IEZ5M406
- ChEBI: CHEBI:87681
- ChEMBL: ChEMBL1404
- CompTox Dashboard (EPA): DTXSID3045196
- ECHA InfoCard: 100.149.259

Chemical and physical data
- Formula: C_{24}H_{33}N_{3}O_{4}
- Molar mass: 427.545 g·mol^{−1}
- 3D model (JSmol): Interactive image
- Chirality: Racemic mixture
- SMILES: O=C(Nc1c(cccc1C)C)CN3CCN(CC(O)COc2ccccc2OC)CC3
- InChI: InChI=1S/C24H33N3O4/c1-18-7-6-8-19(2)24(18)25-23(29)16-27-13-11-26(12-14-27)15-20(28)17-31-22-10-5-4-9-21(22)30-3/h4-10,20,28H,11-17H2,1-3H3,(H,25,29); Key:XKLMZUWKNUAPSZ-UHFFFAOYSA-N

Ranolazine, sold under the brand name Ranexa among others, is a medication used to treat heart related chest pain. Typically it is used together with other medications when those are insufficient. Therapeutic benefits appear smaller in females than males. It is taken by mouth.

Common side effects include constipation, headache, nausea, and dizziness. Serious side effects may include QT prolongation. Ranolazine is contraindicated (not recommended) in those with liver cirrhosis. How it works is not clear but may involve adenosine triphosphate.

Ranolazine was approved for medical use in the United States in 2006. In 2022, it was the 232nd most commonly prescribed medication in the United States, with more than 1 million prescriptions.

== Medical uses ==
Ranolazine is used to treat chronic angina. It may be used concomitantly with β blockers, nitrates, calcium channel blockers, antiplatelet therapy, lipid-lowering therapy, ACE inhibitors, and angiotensin receptor blockers. It is also effective at preventing atrial fibrillation, and has been studied as monotherapy as well as in combination with other medications used to treat irregular heartbeat.

Its use is not recommended in Scotland as of 2019.

== Contraindications ==
Some contraindications for ranolazine are related to its metabolism and are described under Drug Interactions. Additionally, in clinical trials ranolazine slightly increased QT interval in some patients and the FDA label contains a warning for doctors to beware of this effect in their patients. The drug's effect on the QT interval is increased in the setting of liver dysfunction; thus it is contraindicated in persons with mild to severe liver disease.

== Side effects ==
The most common side effects are dizziness (11.5%) and constipation (10.9%). Other side effects include headache and nausea.

== Drug interactions ==
Ranolazine is metabolized mainly by the CYP3A enzyme. It also inhibits another metabolizing enzyme, cytochrome CYP2D6. For this reason, the doses of ranolazine and drugs that interact with those enzymes need to be adjusted when they are used by the same patient.

Ranolazine should not be used with drugs such as ketoconazole, clarithromycin, and nelfinavir that strongly inhibit CYP3A, nor with drugs that activate CYP3A, such as rifampin and phenobarbital.

For drugs that are moderate CYP3A inhibitors, such as diltiazem, verapamil, and erythromycin, the dose of ranolazine should be reduced.

Drugs that are metabolized by CYP2D6, such as tricyclic antidepressants, may need to be given at reduced doses when administered with ranolazine.

== Mechanism of action ==
Ranolazine inhibits persistent or late inward sodium current (I_{Na}) in heart muscle in a variety of voltage-gated sodium channels. Inhibiting that current leads to reductions in intracellular calcium levels. This in turn leads to reduced tension in the heart wall, leading to reduced oxygen requirements for the muscle. The QT prolongation effect of ranolazine on the surface electrocardiogram is the result of inhibition of I_{Kr}, which prolongs the ventricular action potential. Ranolazine also exhibits its effects on the delayed rectifier current (hERG/I_{Kr} potassium channels), it readily stimulates myogenesis, it reduces a pro-oxidant inflammation/oxidative condition, and activates the calcium signaling pathway.

Ranolazine prolongs the action potential duration, with corresponding QT interval prolongation on electrocardiography, blocks the I_{Na} current, and prevents calcium overload caused by the hyperactive I_{Na} current, thus it stabilizes the membrane and reducing excitability.

== History ==
Syntex Inc. originally began developing ranolazine in 1985 and 61 studies were completed from then until 1994. Afterwards, Phase 2 studies were done; however, it was found that the formulation did not result in adequate plasma concentrations of drug. It is due to this that the sustained-release (SR) formulation of ranolazine was created.

Roche acquired Syntex in 1994 In 1996, CV Therapeutics licensed the North American and European rights to ranolazine from Syntex, a subsidiary of Roche, which had discovered the drug and had developed it through Phase II trials in angina. In 2006, CV Therapeutics acquired the remaining worldwide rights to ranolazine from Roche. In 2008 CV Therapeutics exclusively licensed rights for ranolazine in Europe and some other countries to Menarini. In 2009, Gilead acquired CV Therapeutics. In 2013 Gilead expanded the partnership with Menarini to include additional countries, including those in Asia.

== Society and culture ==
=== Legal status ===
Ranolazine was approved by the FDA in January 2006, for the treatment of patients with chronic angina as a second-line treatment in addition to other drugs. In 2007 the label was updated to make ranolazine a first-line treatment, alone or with other drugs. In April 2008 ranolazine was approved by the European EMEA for use in angina.

=== Commercial aspects ===
Ranolazine is manufactured and sold as Ranexa by Gilead. According to a Gilead annual income statement, combined sales for Ranexa and another Gilead product, AmBisom, were $621 million for the fourth quarter of 2016.

Ranolazine might constitute a therapeutic option to improve the two main strategies currently used to treat metastatic melanoma. Research suggests that the transfer of a neurotransmitter from one type of skin cell, melanocytes to another, keratinocytes altered electrical activity and promoted melanoma initiation in preclinical models
