= Calmodulin 1 =

Protein found in humans

CALM1
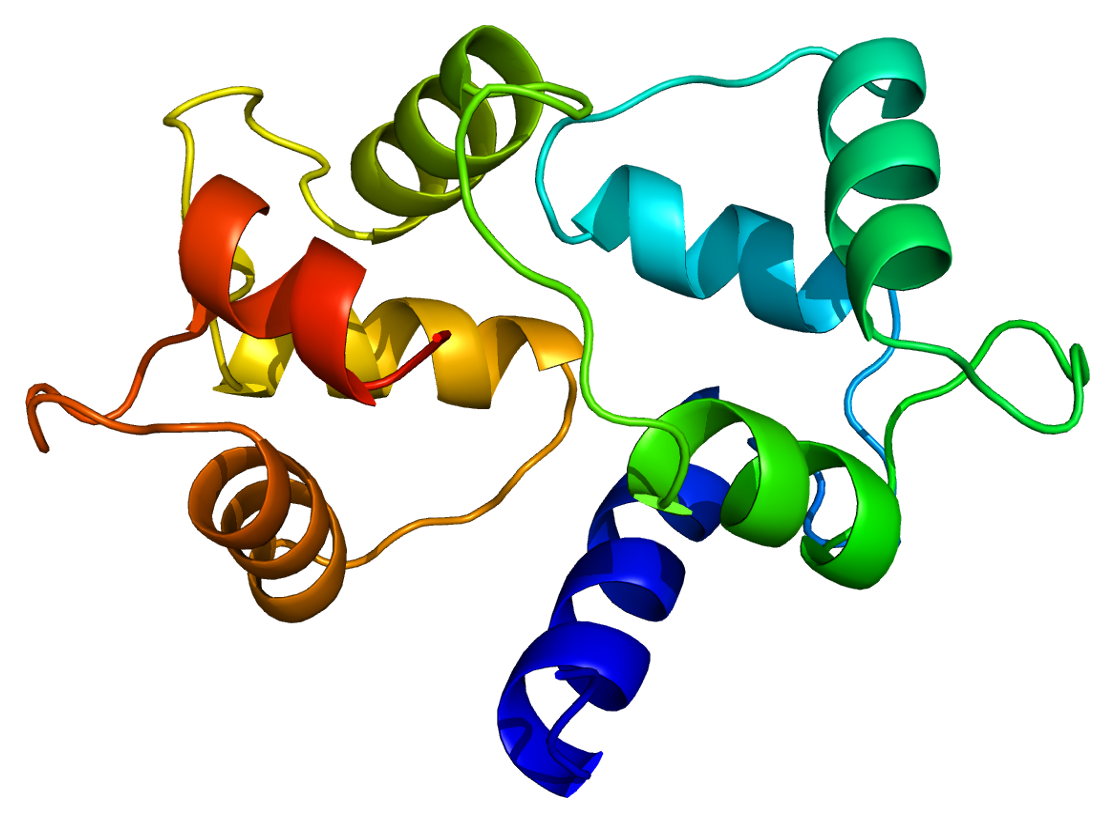

Identifiers
- Aliases: CALM1, CALML2, CAMI, CPVT4, DD132, PHKD, caM, LQT14, Calmodulin 1, calmodulin 1 (phosphorylase kinase, delta), CAMC, CAMB, CAMIII, CAM3, CAM2
- External IDs: OMIM: 114180; GeneCards: CALM1
Available structures
PDB	Human UniProt search: PDBe RCSB
PDB	List of PDB id codes 2VAY, 1Y6W, 4JPZ, 3UCY, 1WRZ, 4G28, 1ZOT, 1YRT, 1IQ5, 1CDL, 2LL6, 3HR4, 4BW7, 4BW8, 1YR5, 4J9Y, 4LZX, 1L7Z, 1ZUZ, 2BE6, 2V01, 1XFV, 2M55, 1CTR, 2I08, 2MG5, 2R28, 3O77, 4UPU, 2L7L, 2K0F, 2M0K, 4V0C, 1SW8, 2WEL, 3DVK, 2M0J, 3DVM, 2KUH, 1K90, 1K93, 4G27, 1CLL, 2KUG, 1XFX, 4DJC, 2LQC, 2LQP, 4L79, 2W73, 2LV6, 1NKF, 2JZI, 3UCT, 4GOW, 1J7O, 1PK0, 4Q5U, 2V02, 3BYA, 4Q57, 2KNE, 1YRU, 2Y4V, 2L53, 2F3Y, 3O78, 1LVC, 4M1L, 2K0E, 1S26, 4DCK, 1XFW, 3SUI, 2X0G, 3EWV, 1XFY, 2LL7, 4OVN, 3J41, 2BKI, 1SK6, 3DVJ, 3UCW, 2LGF, 4UMO, 3DVE, 4JQ0, 3OXQ, 2K61, 1XFU, 3SJQ, 2K0J, 4BYF, 1J7P, 3G43, 3EWT, 4J9Z, 1XFZ, 2F3Z, 1IWQ, 2N6A, 2HF5, 2N27, 4ZLK, 5COC

Gene location (Human)
Chr.	Chromosome 14 (human)
Band	14q32.11	Start	90,396,502 bp
Band	14q32.11	End	90,408,268 bp
RNA expression pattern
Bgee	Human / Mouse (ortholog); Top expressed in: lateral nuclear group of thalamus; internal globus pallidus; parietal lobe; postcentral gyrus; pons; frontal pole; orbitofrontal cortex; superior vestibular nucleus; paraflocculus of cerebellum; external globus pallidus / n/a; More reference expression data
BioGPS	n/a
Gene ontology
Molecular function	calcium ion binding; protein binding; calcium channel inhibitor activity; protein kinase binding; titin binding; protein serine/threonine kinase activator activity; transmembrane transporter binding; metal ion binding; protein phosphatase activator activity; adenylate cyclase binding; disordered domain specific binding; inositol-1,4,5-trisphosphate 3-kinase activity; ligand-gated ion channel activity; adenylate cyclase activator activity; protein domain specific binding; nitric-oxide synthase regulator activity; type 3 metabotropic glutamate receptor binding; N-terminal myristoylation domain binding; phosphatidylinositol 3-kinase binding; protein N-terminus binding; calcium-dependent protein binding; nitric-oxide synthase binding
Cellular component	cytoplasm; cytosol; calcium channel complex; extracellular region; spindle microtubule; neuron projection; cytoskeleton; nucleus; centrosome; voltage-gated potassium channel complex; extracellular exosome; spindle pole; growth cone; plasma membrane; spindle; sarcomere; nucleoplasm; vesicle; postsynaptic density; catalytic complex; microtubule organizing center; synaptic vesicle membrane; mitochondrial membranes; protein-containing complex; myelin sheath
Biological process	muscle contraction; response to amphetamine; positive regulation of protein serine/threonine kinase activity; detection of calcium ion; Fc-epsilon receptor signaling pathway; positive regulation of phosphoprotein phosphatase activity; G2/M transition of mitotic cell cycle; regulation of high voltage-gated calcium channel activity; positive regulation of DNA binding; substantia nigra development; positive regulation of protein dephosphorylation; inositol phosphate metabolic process; positive regulation of nitric-oxide synthase activity; glycogen catabolic process; positive regulation of cyclic-nucleotide phosphodiesterase activity; G protein-coupled receptor signaling pathway; regulation of cytokinesis; regulation of cardiac muscle contraction by regulation of the release of sequestered calcium ion; regulation of rhodopsin mediated signaling pathway; response to corticosterone; negative regulation of peptidyl-threonine phosphorylation; activation of adenylate cyclase activity; regulation of heart rate; positive regulation of ryanodine-sensitive calcium-release channel activity; response to calcium ion; regulation of ryanodine-sensitive calcium-release channel activity; regulation of nitric-oxide synthase activity; platelet degranulation; negative regulation of ryanodine-sensitive calcium-release channel activity; MAPK cascade; positive regulation of peptidyl-threonine phosphorylation; positive regulation of protein autophosphorylation; regulation of cardiac muscle contraction; regulation of cell communication by electrical coupling involved in cardiac conduction; regulation of release of sequestered calcium ion into cytosol by sarcoplasmic reticulum; calcium-mediated signaling; ion transmembrane transport; Wnt signaling pathway, calcium modulating pathway; positive regulation of GTPase activity; protein methylation; establishment of protein localization to membrane; establishment of protein localization to mitochondrial membrane; regulation of synaptic vesicle endocytosis; regulation of synaptic vesicle exocytosis
Sources:Amigo / QuickGO
Orthologs
Databases	NCBI: entry; OMA: entry
Species	Human	Mouse
Entrez	801	n/a
Ensembl	ENSG00000198668	n/a
UniProt	P0DP23; P0DP24	n/a
RefSeq (mRNA)	NM_001166106; NM_006888; NM_001363669; NM_001363670	n/a
RefSeq (protein)	NP_001292553; NP_001292554; NP_001292555; NP_001734; NP_001316850 NP_001316851; NP_001316852; NP_001316853; NP_001316854; NP_001316855; NP_005175; NP_008819; NP_001350598; NP_001350599; NP_008819; NP_001292553; NP_001292554; NP_001292555; NP_001734; NP_001316850; NP_001316851; NP_001316852; NP_001316853; NP_001316854; NP_001316855; NP_005175	n/a
Location (UCSC)	Chr 14: 90.4 – 90.41 Mb	n/a
PubMed search		n/a
- Wikidata
View/Edit Human

Calmodulin 1 is a protein in humans that is encoded by the CALM1 gene.

Calmodulin plays a role in calcium signal transduction pathways by regulating control of ion channels, enzymes, aquaporins, and other proteins. It functions as a calcium-binding protein that has been grouped into the EF-hand motif found in eukaryotic cells. Calmodulin plays a significant role in numerous cellular pathways and it acts as a calcium detector within the cells that interact with varied target proteins. Additionally, it stimulates the activation of over twenty amino acids which helps to control various physiological functions. It is also required for various regulatory roles in cell proliferation and throughout many points during the cell cycle.

Upon binding to targeted calcium (acts as ligand), calmodulin undergoes a change in shape that allows it to interact with multiple protein types including phosphatases, ion channels, and kinases. This conformational change is associated with undergoing various cellular processes: including muscle contraction, release of neurotransmitters into the bloodstream, and gene expression.

== Function ==
Calmodulin 1 is the archetype of the family of calcium-modulated (calmodulin) proteins of which nearly 20 members have been found. They are identified by their occurrence in the cytosol or on membranes facing the cytosol and by a high affinity for calcium. Calmodulin contains 149 amino acids and has 4 calcium-binding EF hand motifs. Its functions include roles in growth and the cell cycle as well as in signal transduction and the synthesis and release of neurotransmitters.

== Gene expression ==
In humans, there are three genetic isoforms of calmodulin which are encoded by the homologous gene variations: CALM1, CALM2, and CALM3. Each three of the isoforms produce distinct, yet closely associated forms of calmodulin. At the nucleic acid level, the coding regions differ by a 15% between CALM1 and CALM2 and 13% between CALM2 and CALM3.

Calmodulin I, abbreviated CALM1, is located on chromosome 14 of the human genome, and is one of the three isoforms of calmodulin. It's found in all human tissues, although the expression varies depending on tissue type. There are high expression levels found in the brain, muscle, and blood.

Throughout the body, CALM1 plays a significant role in muscle contraction and relaxation in skeletal and smooth muscle. In heart muscle, CALM1 is vital for the regulation of calcium signaling to control efficient cardiac functioning. Calcium/calmodulin protein kinases (CaMKs) work symbiotically to regulate calcium signaling throughout the body. CAMKII, the most prolific isoform, is found in cardiac tissue where it controls excitation-contraction coupling. Calmodulin I also plays an important role in the immune system through lymphocytes (white blood cells) where it contributes to immune cell function and activation. In bone tissue, Calmodulin I is associated with osteoblasts, osteoclasts, and osteocytes, by functioning in intracellular calcium signaling to ensure bone mineralization, resorption, and remodeling.

Calmodulin 1 can be expressed as one of two transcript types, which can be distinguished by length and tissue location. The major transcript is present in all tissues and is recorded as 1.7-kb in length. The minor transcript is either 4.1-kb or 4.4kb in length, and is only found in brain and skeletal muscle tissue. The difference in transcript lengths are caused by substitute cleavage and polyadenylation signals (APA), which permits the origination of different mRNA isoforms.

=== Pseudogenes ===
There are two known pseudogenes of Calmodulin 1, which are known as CALMIPI and CALMIP2. CALMPI was first discovered on chromosome 7, and the CALMPI2 was later identified on chromosome X. Experimentation shows both pseudogenes lack introns and have multiple mutations in their open reading frame, meaning that they cease all functions.

=== Mapping ===
Human and rodent hybridized somatic cell panels show that complementary DNA for calmodulin I was localized to chromosome 14, with some cross hybridization activity on chromosome 7, and minor involvement on chromosome X.

== Identifiers ==
- Protein Identification: P62158 (aka CALM_HUMAN)
- Gene Identification: 114180

CALM1 Biochemical & Signaling Pathways Kyoto Encyclopedia of Genes and Genomes (KEGG):
hsa04020	Calcium signaling pathway
hsa04070	Phosphatidylinositol signaling system
hsa04114	Oocyte meiosis
hsa04270	Vascular smooth muscle contraction
hsa04720	Long-term potentiation
hsa04722	Neurotrophin signaling pathway
hsa04740	Olfactory transduction
hsa04744	Phototransduction
hsa04910	Insulin signaling pathway
hsa04912	GnRH signaling pathway
hsa04916	Melanogenesis
hsa05010	Alzheimer's disease
hsa05214	Glioma

Calmodulin I protein family domains:
PF00036	EF hand
PF08726	Ca2+ insensitive EF hand
PF12763	Cytoskeletal-regulatory complex EF hand
PF13202	EF hand
PF13405	EF-hand domain
PF13499	EF-hand domain pair
PF13833	EF-hand domain pair
PF14658	EF-hand domain

== Interactions ==
Calmodulin 1 has been shown to interact with:

- AKAP9,
- Androgen receptor,
- IQGAP1,
- PPEF1, and
- TRPV1.

== Mutations ==
Mutations of CALM1 CALM2 or CALM3 can lead to critical cardiac deficiencies including long QT syndrome (LQTS) and catecholaminergic polymorphic ventricular tachycardia (CPVT). Studies investigating calmodulin-associated diseases have discovered multiple proteins modified by calmodulin that determine the virulence of the mutations, including the cardiac L-type calcium channel (LTCC) Cav1.2, the sarcoplasmic reticulum calcium release channel, and the ryanodine receptor 2 (RyR2).

CALM1 disease mutations are often diagnosed in patients aged ten or younger, whereas CALM2 and CALM3 mutations typically develop in adulthood. Calmodulin functioning defects cause interference of vital calcium signaling events within the heart muscle which disrupts membrane ion channels. The disruptions in cell signaling can lead to potentially life-threatening cardiac disturbances in adolescence.

=== Diseases correlated with CALM1 ===
- Long QT Syndrome-14 (LQT14)

LQT14 is caused by the heterozygous mutation in the CALM1 gene (114180) on chromosome 14q32. It often produces life-threatening ventricular arrhythmias that manifest at a young age with persistent periods of T-wave alternans, notably sustained QTc intervals, and irregular 2:1 atrioventricular blocks.

- Catecholaminergic polymorphic ventricular tachycardia (CPVT)

CPVT is an inherited disorder that presents with episodes of syncope and/or sudden cardiac infarctions during exercise or extreme emotional episodes in humans without structural cardiac deformities. Mutations in the ryanodine-receptor 2 channel (RYR2) that causes calcium leakage from the sarcoplasmic reticulum have been proven to cause about half of dominantly inherited cases of CPVT.

It has been discovered that some individuals with CPVT have distinct mutations on the Calmodulin I gene. The mutations cause disruption in the proper functioning of the gene, which leads to abnormal calcium control in cardiac tissue cells. The calcium disturbance can trigger ventricular arrhythmias in reaction to blood vessel vasoconstriction, such as during periods of exercise or elevated stress.
