= Personal knowledge networking =

Personal knowledge networks (PKN) are methods for organizations to identify, capture, evaluate, retrieve, verify and share information. This method was primarily conceived by researchers to facilitate the sharing of personal, informal knowledge between organizations. Various technologies and behaviors support personal knowledge networking, including wikis and Really Simple Syndication (RSS).

Researchers propose that knowledge management (KM) can occur with little explicit governance. This trend is referred to as "grassroots KM" as opposed to traditional, top-down enterprise KM.

== Origin ==
In an organization, individuals often know each other and interact beyond their official duties, leading to knowledge flows and learning.

- Drawbacks of Traditional Knowledge Management

Traditional Knowledge Management focuses more on technology than on social interaction. Organizations should first look at the culture inherent inside, as it significantly affects the social interaction among members involved.

- Technical Support from Social Network

Social software provides an answer to this previous question. It is a means of giving people what they want in terms of their traditional knowledge management activities, in a way that also benefits the firm.

== Comparison between KM and PKN ==
=== Structural Aspect ===
- Content-Centric vs User-Centric

A content-based process is regarded as a major factor leading to the incompatibility of Knowledge Management in the current situation. In contrast, a user-based process focuses on each individual in a learning process, shifting the driving force of knowledge from an organization's content database to the learners themselves. Furthermore, knowledge can only be evaluated or managed by individuals, emphasizing its unique nature.

- Centralized vs Distributed

In the PKN model, knowledge learning is undertaken with a high consideration of its natural distributed format. In comparison, the centralized feature has been proven to perform well in guiding an organized and structured learning session. However, the well-structured guidance could hardly satisfy the various and timely requirements of today's users.

- Top-Down vs Bottom-Up

Top-down models and hierarchically controlled structures are the enemies of innovation. In general, learners and knowledge workers love to learn, but they hate not being given the freedom to decide how they learn and work (Cross, 2003). Given this fact, a better way to cope with this system is to let them develop and emerge naturally in a free-form way, which could be abstracted to a bottom-up structure.

- Enforcement vs Voluntary

Traditional KM mainly adopts a pushing model that passively provides content to users and expects the learning process to happen. This model is not sufficient to improve learners' motivation. Considering the dynamic and flexible nature of the learning process, LM and KM approaches require a shift in emphasis from a knowledge-push to a knowledge-pull model. PKN provides a more attractive platform where users can locate content according to their needs from information repositories.

=== Application Aspect ===
- Personal knowledge search tools instead of searching on the corporate intranet
- "Blogging" instead of the enterprise's Web content management
