= Timothy syndrome =

- Specialty: Neurology

Timothy syndrome is a rare autosomal-dominant disorder characterized by physical malformations, as well as neurological and developmental defects, including heart QT-prolongation, heart arrhythmias, structural heart defects, syndactyly (webbing of fingers and toes), and autism spectrum disorders. Timothy syndrome represents one clinical manifestation of a range of disorders associated with mutations in CACNA1C, the gene encoding the calcium channel Ca_{v}1.2 α subunit.

== Signs and symptoms ==
The most striking sign of Timothy syndrome type 1 is the co-occurrence of both syndactyly (about 0.03% of births) and long QT syndrome (1% per year) in a single patient. Other common symptoms include cardiac arrhythmia (94%), heart malformations (59%), and autism or an autism spectrum disorder (80% who survive long enough for evaluation). Facial dysmorphologies such as flattened noses also occur in about half of patients. Children with this disorder have small teeth, which is due to poor enamel coating, are prone to dental cavities and often require removal. The average age of death due to complications of these symptoms is 2.5 years, although there have been multiple reports of patients living in to their mid- or late-twenties.

Timothy syndrome type 2 has largely the same symptoms as the classical form. Differences in the type 2 form are the lack of syndactyly, the presence of musculoskeletal problems (particularly hyperflexible joints), and often hip dysplasia. Patients with Timothy syndrome type 2 also have more facial deformities, including protruding foreheads and tongues.

Children with Timothy syndrome tend to be born via caesarean section due to fetal distress.

== Pathophysiology ==
Timothy syndrome has an autosomal-dominant pattern of inheritance.

There are two recognized types of Timothy syndrome, classical (type-1) and a second type (type-2). They are both caused by mutations in CACNA1C, the gene encoding the calcium channel Ca_{v}1.2 α subunit. Timothy syndrome mutations in CACNA1C cause delayed channel closing, also known as voltage-dependent inactivation, thus increased cellular excitability.

Both types of Timothy syndromes are caused by mutations in CACNA1C. These mutations are in exon 8 (type 2) and exon 8a (classical form, type 1). Exons 8 and 8A are mutually exclusive exons. Exon 8a is highly expressed in the heart, brain, gastrointestinal system, lungs, immune system, and smooth muscle. Exon 8 is also expressed in these regions and its level is roughly five-fold higher than exon 8a expression.

One mutation is found in patients with classical Timothy syndrome, G406R, located just past the sixth membrane-spanning segment of domain 1 (D1S6). The conserved glycine at this position seems to be vital for proper voltage-dependent inactivation, as the mutant is lacking in this respect. Timothy syndrome type 2 mutations are similar, being the identical G406R mutation in the other splice form. A second mutation resulting in G402S, located a few amino acids upstream, was originally also given the name of type 2, but it is now recognized as a variant that causes non-syndromic LQT8. The effect of the G406R mutations on channel function is identical in the two forms of Timothy syndrome. The lack of proper voltage-dependent inactivation in these mutants causes prolonged inward current and depolarization during cardiac action potentials. This leads to long QT syndrome and resultant arrhythmia. Because exon 8 has greater expression in the heart versus exon 8a, patients with Timothy syndrome type 2 have worsened cardiac defects compared to those with the classical form.

A pig model of the disease, carrying the same mutation as the one found in patients, allowed to identify that the calcium overload state leads the development of a substrate for functional reentry characterised by slowing of cardiac impulse propagation. Single cell studies identified that CaMKII autophosphorylation reduced the peak sodium current, thus causing the slowing of conduction.

== Diagnosis ==
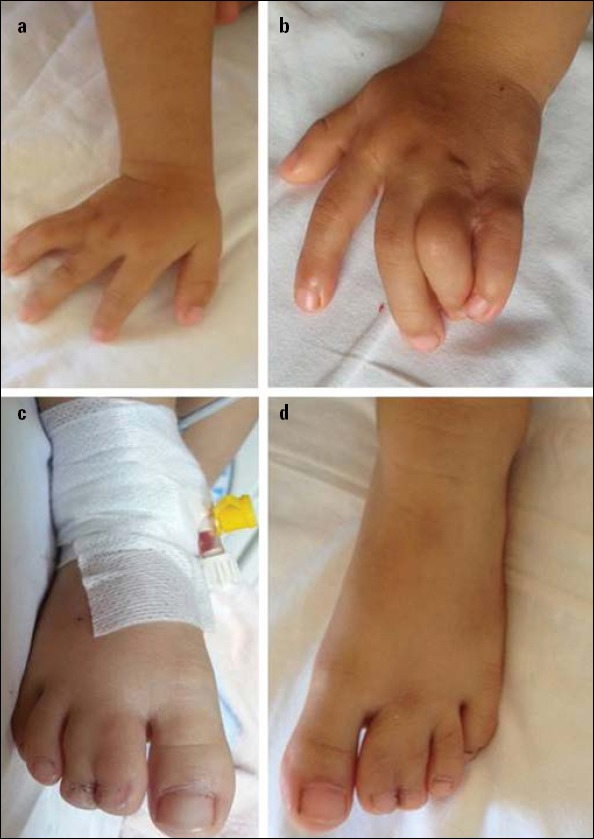
Syndactyly in a 2 1/2-year old girl with Timothy syndrome

Syndactyly and other deformities are typically observed and diagnosed at birth. Long QT syndrome sometimes presents itself as a complication due to surgery to correct syndactyly. Other times, children collapse spontaneously while playing. In all cases, it is confirmed with ECG measurements. Sequencing of the CACNA1C gene further confirms the diagnosis.

== Treatment ==
Surgery is typically used to correct structural heart defects and syndactyly. Propranolol or other beta-adrenergic blockers are often prescribed, as well as insertion of a pacemaker to maintain proper heart rhythm. With the characterization of Timothy syndrome mutations indicating that they cause defects in calcium currents, calcium channel blockers may be effective as a therapeutic agent.

== Prognosis ==
The prognosis for patients diagnosed with Timothy syndrome is very poor. Of 17 children analyzed in one study, 10 died at an average age of 2.5 years. Of those that did survive, three were diagnosed with autism, one with an autism spectrum disorder, and the last had severe delays in language development. One patient with the G402S mutation was largely normal with the exception of heart arrhythmia. Likewise, the mother of two Timothy syndrome patients also carried the mutation, but lacked any obvious phenotype. In both of these cases, however, the lack of severity of the disorder was due to mosaicism.

== History ==
Some of the abnormalities observed in Timothy syndrome were described in the 1990s. However, it was linked with calcium channel abnormalities in 2004, and the disorder was thence named "Timothy syndrome" in honor of Katherine W. Timothy, who was among the first to identify a case and performed much of the phenotypic analysis that revealed other abnormalities.

== See also ==
- List of syndromes
- Symptom
- Sequence (medicine)
- Characteristics of syndromic ASD conditions
