= Protein kinase N1 =

Protein-coding gene in the species Homo sapiens

PKN1
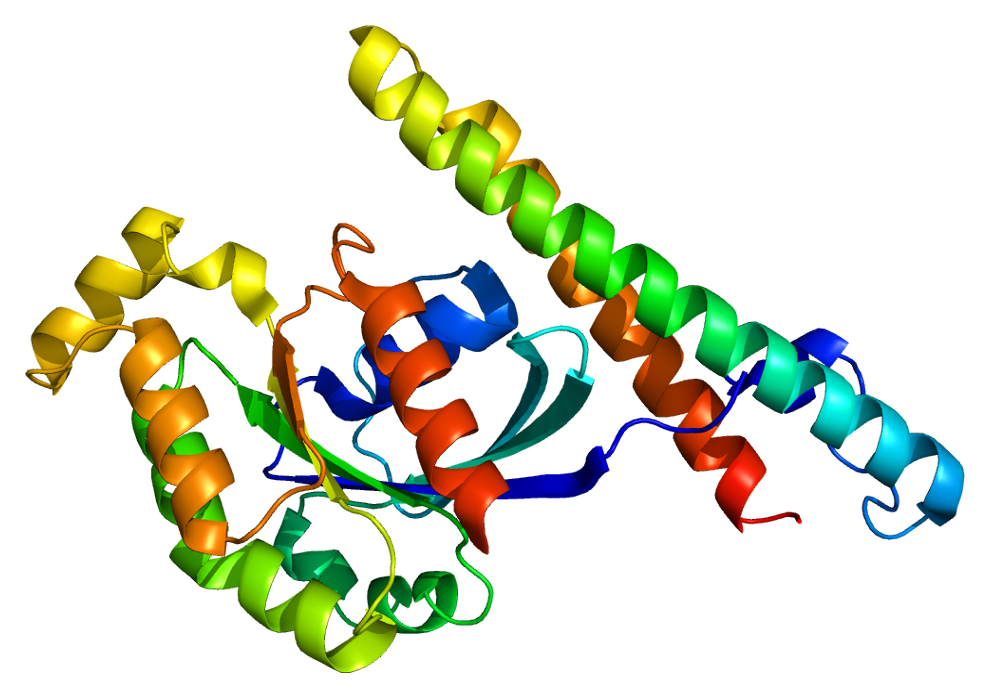

Identifiers
- Aliases: PKN1, DBK, PAK-1, PAK1, PKN, PKN-ALPHA, PRK1, PRKCL1, Protein kinase N1
- External IDs: OMIM: 601032; MGI: 108022; GeneCards: PKN1
Available structures
| PDB | Ortholog search: PDBe RCSB |
| PDB | List of PDB id codes 1CXZ, 1URF, 2RMK, 4NKG, 4OTD, 4OTG, 4OTH, 4OTI |
Enzyme activity
| EC # | BRENDA | ExPASy | KEGG | MetaCyc |
|---|---|---|---|---|
| 2.7.11.13 | ↗ | ↗ | ↗ | ↗ |

Gene location (Human)
| Chr. | Chromosome 19 (human) |
| Band | 19p13.12 | Start | 14,433,053 bp |
| Band | 19p13.12 | End | 14,471,867 bp |

Gene location (Mouse)
| Chr. | Chromosome 8 (mouse) |
| Band | 8 C2|8 40.22 cM | Start | 84,393,165 bp |
| Band | 8 C2|8 40.22 cM | End | 84,425,808 bp |
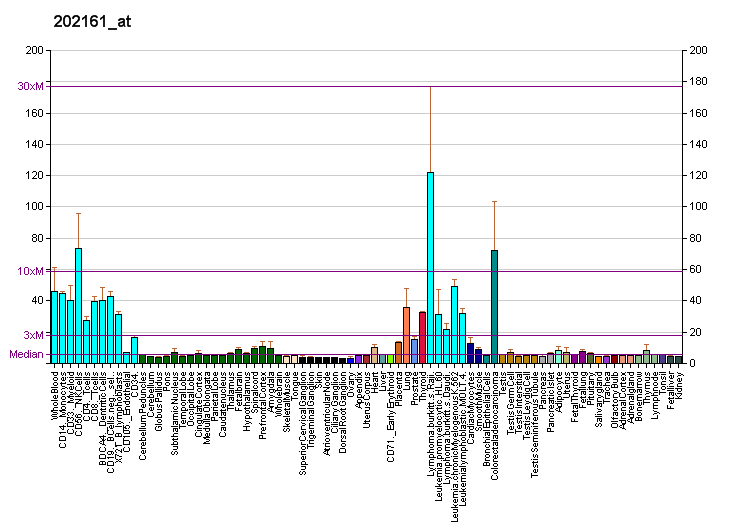
RNA expression pattern
| Bgee | Human / Mouse (ortholog); Top expressed in: apex of heart; granulocyte; ventricular zone; right lung; stromal cell of endometrium; muscle of thigh; ganglionic eminence; monocyte; upper lobe of left lung; gastric mucosa / Top expressed in: granulocyte; thymus; muscle of thigh; superior frontal gyrus; external carotid artery; ventricular zone; right ventricle; primary visual cortex; right kidney; internal carotid artery; More reference expression data |
| BioGPS | More reference expression data |
Gene ontology
| Molecular function | transferase activity; protein kinase activity; nucleotide binding; protein kinase C activity; histone binding; histone deacetylase binding; chromatin binding; histone kinase activity (H3-T11 specific); kinase activity; protein serine/threonine kinase activity; protein binding; androgen receptor binding; nuclear receptor coactivator activity; ATP binding; protein kinase C binding |
| Cellular component | cytoplasm; cytosol; endosome; membrane; plasma membrane; nucleoplasm; midbody; cleavage furrow; nucleus; cytoplasmic vesicle; protein-containing complex |
| Biological process | regulation of germinal center formation; negative regulation of protein phosphorylation; renal system process; regulation of transcription, DNA-templated; B cell apoptotic process; negative regulation of protein kinase activity; phosphorylation; regulation of transcription by RNA polymerase II; B cell homeostasis; spleen development; hyperosmotic response; transcription, DNA-templated; regulation of cell motility; protein phosphorylation; peptidyl-serine phosphorylation; epithelial cell migration; negative regulation of B cell proliferation; regulation of immunoglobulin production; signal transduction; chromatin organization; positive regulation of nucleic acid-templated transcription; intracellular signal transduction |
Sources:Amigo / QuickGO
Orthologs
| Databases | NCBI: entry; OMA: entry |
| Species | Human | Mouse |
| Entrez | 5585 | 320795 |
| Ensembl | ENSG00000123143 | ENSMUSG00000057672 |
| UniProt | Q16512 | P70268 |
| RefSeq (mRNA) | NM_002741; NM_213560 | NM_001199593; NM_177262 |
| RefSeq (protein) | NP_002732; NP_998725 | NP_001186522; NP_796236 |
| Location (UCSC) | Chr 19: 14.43 – 14.47 Mb | Chr 8: 84.39 – 84.43 Mb |
| PubMed search |
- Wikidata
| View/Edit Human | View/Edit Mouse |

Serine/threonine-protein kinase N1 is an enzyme that in humans is encoded by the PKN1 gene.

== Function ==
The protein encoded by this gene belongs to the protein kinase C superfamily. This kinase is activated by Rho family of small G proteins and may mediate the Rho-dependent signaling pathway. This kinase can be activated by phospholipids and by limited proteolysis. The 3-phosphoinositide dependent protein kinase-1 (PDPK1/PDK1) is reported to phosphorylate this kinase, which may mediate insulin signals to the actin cytoskeleton. The proteolytic activation of this kinase by caspase-3 or related proteases during apoptosis suggests its role in signal transduction related to apoptosis. Alternatively spliced transcript variants encoding distinct isoforms have been observed.

== Interactions ==
Protein kinase N1 has been shown to interact with:

- AKAP9,
- Actinin, alpha 1,
- CCDC85B,
- NEFL,
- NEUROD2
- Phosphoinositide-dependent kinase-1,
- Phospholipase D1,
- RHOA, and
- Vimentin.
- TRAF1.
