= CALM3 =

Protein-coding gene in humans

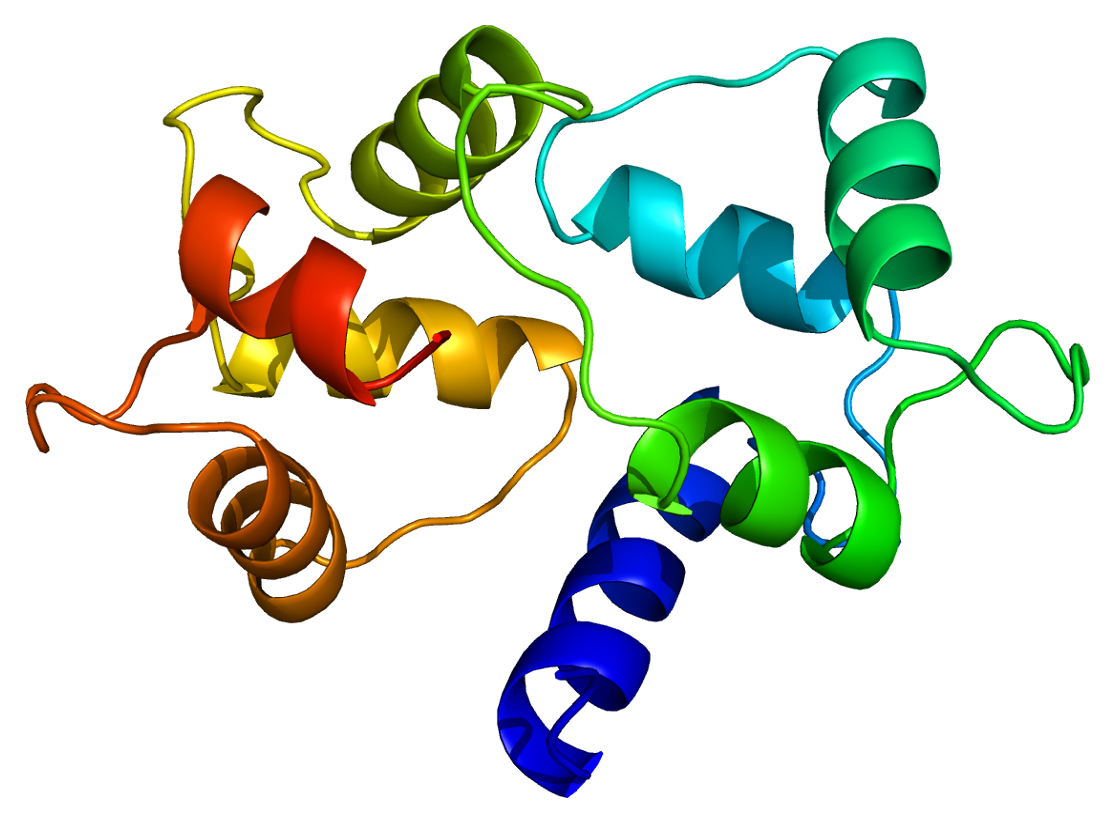

Identifiers
- Aliases: CALM3, HEL-S-72, PHKD, PHKD3, calmodulin 3 (phosphorylase kinase, delta), CaM, CaMIII, calmodulin 3, CAM1, CAMB, CALM, CAM2, CPVT6, LQT16
- External IDs: OMIM: 114183; GeneCards: CALM3
Available structures
PDB	Human UniProt search: PDBe RCSB
PDB	List of PDB id codes 2VAY, 1Y6W, 4JPZ, 3UCY, 1WRZ, 4G28, 1ZOT, 1YRT, 1IQ5, 1CDL, 2LL6, 3HR4, 4BW7, 4BW8, 1YR5, 4J9Y, 4LZX, 1L7Z, 1ZUZ, 2BE6, 2V01, 1XFV, 2M55, 1CTR, 2I08, 2MG5, 2R28, 3O77, 4UPU, 2L7L, 2K0F, 2M0K, 4V0C, 1SW8, 2WEL, 3DVK, 2M0J, 3DVM, 2KUH, 1K90, 1K93, 4G27, 1CLL, 2KUG, 1XFX, 4DJC, 2LQC, 2LQP, 4L79, 2W73, 2LV6, 1NKF, 2JZI, 3UCT, 4GOW, 1J7O, 1PK0, 4Q5U, 2V02, 3BYA, 4Q57, 2KNE, 1YRU, 2Y4V, 2L53, 2F3Y, 3O78, 1LVC, 4M1L, 2K0E, 1S26, 4DCK, 1XFW, 3SUI, 2X0G, 3EWV, 1XFY, 2LL7, 4OVN, 3J41, 2BKI, 1SK6, 3DVJ, 3UCW, 2LGF, 4UMO, 3DVE, 4JQ0, 3OXQ, 2K61, 1XFU, 3SJQ, 2K0J, 4BYF, 1J7P, 3G43, 3EWT, 4J9Z, 1XFZ, 2F3Z, 1IWQ, 2N6A, 2HF5, 2N27, 4ZLK, 5COC,%%s2HF5

Gene location (Human)
Chr.	Chromosome 19 (human)
Band	19q13.32	Start	46,601,074 bp
Band	19q13.32	End	46,610,782 bp
RNA expression pattern
Bgee	Human / Mouse (ortholog); Top expressed in: prefrontal cortex; right frontal lobe; left testis; right testis; right hemisphere of cerebellum; nucleus accumbens; amygdala; cingulate gyrus; anterior cingulate cortex; Brodmann area 9 / n/a; More reference expression data
BioGPS	n/a
Gene ontology
Molecular function	calcium ion binding; protein binding; calcium channel inhibitor activity; protein kinase binding; titin binding; protein serine/threonine kinase activator activity; transmembrane transporter binding; metal ion binding; protein phosphatase activator activity; adenylate cyclase binding; disordered domain specific binding; inositol-1,4,5-trisphosphate 3-kinase activity; ligand-gated ion channel activity; adenylate cyclase activator activity; protein domain specific binding; nitric-oxide synthase regulator activity; type 3 metabotropic glutamate receptor binding; N-terminal myristoylation domain binding; phosphatidylinositol 3-kinase binding; protein N-terminus binding; calcium-dependent protein binding; nitric-oxide synthase binding; kinase activity
Cellular component	cytoplasm; cytosol; calcium channel complex; extracellular region; spindle microtubule; neuron projection; cytoskeleton; nucleus; centrosome; voltage-gated potassium channel complex; extracellular exosome; spindle pole; growth cone; plasma membrane; spindle; sarcomere; nucleoplasm; vesicle; postsynaptic density; catalytic complex; microtubule organizing center; synaptic vesicle membrane; mitochondrial membranes; protein-containing complex; myelin sheath; intracellular anatomical structure
Biological process	muscle contraction; response to amphetamine; positive regulation of protein serine/threonine kinase activity; detection of calcium ion; Fc-epsilon receptor signaling pathway; positive regulation of phosphoprotein phosphatase activity; G2/M transition of mitotic cell cycle; regulation of high voltage-gated calcium channel activity; positive regulation of DNA binding; substantia nigra development; positive regulation of protein dephosphorylation; inositol phosphate metabolic process; positive regulation of nitric-oxide synthase activity; glycogen catabolic process; positive regulation of cyclic-nucleotide phosphodiesterase activity; G protein-coupled receptor signaling pathway; regulation of cytokinesis; regulation of cardiac muscle contraction by regulation of the release of sequestered calcium ion; regulation of rhodopsin mediated signaling pathway; response to corticosterone; negative regulation of peptidyl-threonine phosphorylation; activation of adenylate cyclase activity; regulation of heart rate; positive regulation of ryanodine-sensitive calcium-release channel activity; response to calcium ion; regulation of ryanodine-sensitive calcium-release channel activity; regulation of nitric-oxide synthase activity; platelet degranulation; negative regulation of ryanodine-sensitive calcium-release channel activity; MAPK cascade; positive regulation of peptidyl-threonine phosphorylation; positive regulation of protein autophosphorylation; regulation of cardiac muscle contraction; regulation of cell communication by electrical coupling involved in cardiac conduction; regulation of release of sequestered calcium ion into cytosol by sarcoplasmic reticulum; calcium-mediated signaling; ion transmembrane transport; Wnt signaling pathway, calcium modulating pathway; positive regulation of GTPase activity; protein methylation; establishment of protein localization to membrane; establishment of protein localization to mitochondrial membrane; regulation of synaptic vesicle endocytosis; regulation of synaptic vesicle exocytosis; phosphorylation
Sources:Amigo / QuickGO
Orthologs
Databases	NCBI: entry; OMA: entry
Species	Human	Mouse
Entrez	808	n/a
Ensembl	ENSG00000160014	n/a
UniProt	P0DP23; Q96HY3; P0DP24	n/a
RefSeq (mRNA)	NM_001329921; NM_001329922; NM_001329923; NM_001329924; NM_001329925 NM_001329926; NM_005184	n/a
RefSeq (protein)	NP_001292553; NP_001292554; NP_001292555; NP_001734; NP_001316850 NP_001316851; NP_001316852; NP_001316853; NP_001316854; NP_001316855; NP_005175; NP_008819; NP_001292554.1; NP_001292555.1; NP_001350598; NP_001350599; NP_008819; NP_001292553; NP_001292554; NP_001292555; NP_001734; NP_001316850; NP_001316851; NP_001316852; NP_001316853; NP_001316854; NP_001316855; NP_005175	n/a
Location (UCSC)	Chr 19: 46.6 – 46.61 Mb	n/a
PubMed search		n/a
- Wikidata
View/Edit Human

Calmodulin 3 is a protein that in humans is encoded by the CALM3 gene.

CALM-3 is best known for contracting the heart muscles, and depending on whether this activity is consistent or not, other diseases could emerge as a downside. It is able to maintain or regulate in different types of biological systems, such as cytokinesis or the centrosome cycle.

Calmodulin-3 is able to perform different types of activities and roles, such as binding of calcium and significant activity in regulating an enzyme. The gene CALM-3 is likely to contribute to illnesses that may lead to death, such as Ventricular tachycardia which is associated with the ventricular tachycardia functioning in 2 directions and long QT syndrome which is associated with the QT interval in the electrocardiogram that is significantly longer than normal. In its structure, there are 2 helices that are observed in each of its helix-loop-helix and are then shaped into a perpendicular pattern due to the surface of the protein changing over time. Through transcription, the gene CALM-3 is able to perform the activity of a regulator for its own gene expression and has 6 exons, indicating that each exon has a specific function that takes place in the initiation stage. If there are potentially variants that could impact the calmodulin protein, it could affect the concentration of the Ca mediators that are a part of the protein.

== Context ==
The CALM-3 gene, along with the protein of calmodulin, has been included in different types of experiments such as DNA isolation that is most common in laboratory animals such as rats. This gene can be detected in animals and humans, mainly through our genomes, and its specific polymorphisms can be found through different types of restriction enzymes. In hospital settings, a process named whole exome sequencing are used and are beneficial in determining whether CALM-3 is a cause of a certain disease. Because the protein calmodulin consists of 3 different genes, it may be difficult to determine exactly how the gene can cause a certain disease to occur and potentially worsen. However, there have been few mutations that were detected in the genes of the calmodulin protein such as in long QT syndrome.

== Clinical significance ==
There is significant evidence that Calmodulin-3 may be associated with certain diseases, however there are few evidence that this particular gene contributes to diseases that can cause a sudden death as a result. In the lab experiment with rats, lambda rCB1 or hCE1 underwent DNA isolation as both of the genes included the CALM-3 gene, and was compared with 2 different genes that are more common among rats such as genes lambda SC4 and lambda SC8. As a result, although the lambda rCB1 or hCE1 gene may have different structures from the other genes that rats contain in their genomes, its coding strands were fairly similar. As the process of whole exome sequencing was used for patients with long QT syndrome, there was a certain criteria that had to be met in order to fully go through WES such as the patient having a stable or normal medical family history. Based on an electrocardiogram, the rhythms and waves can be detected and if irregular, it could lead to the pathway of long QT syndrome.
