= CALM2 =

Protein-coding gene in humans

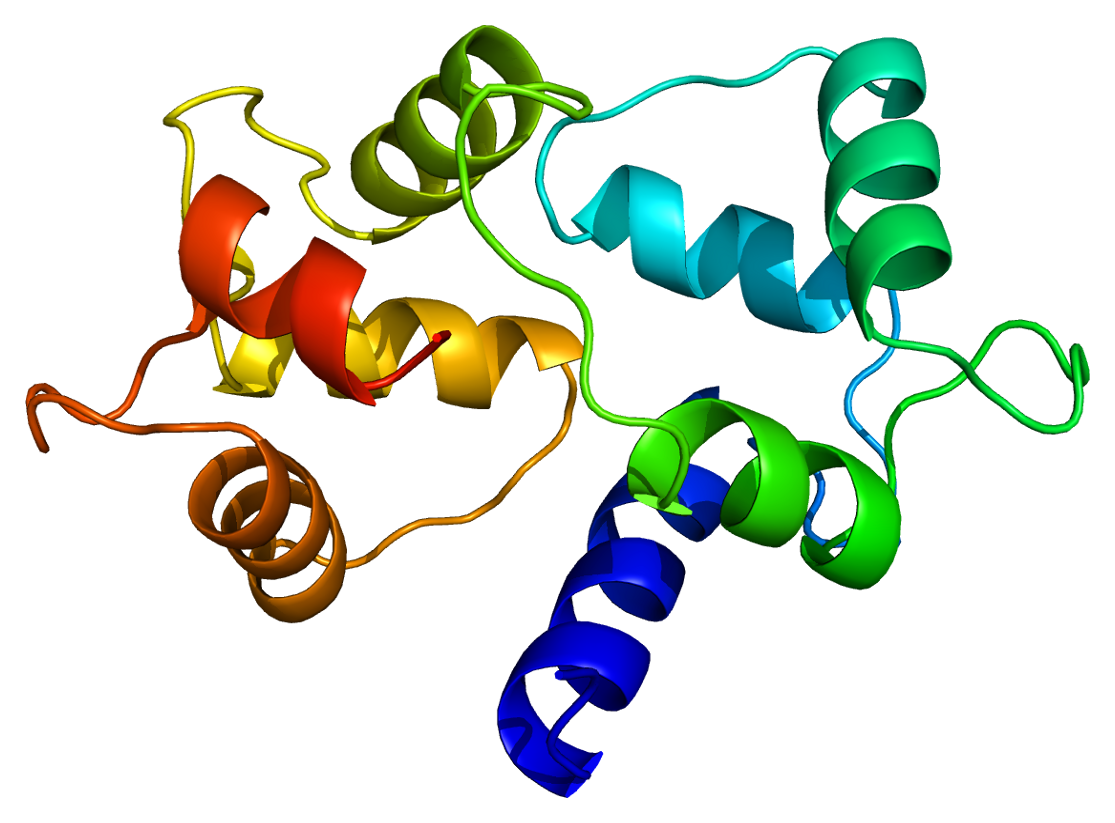

Identifiers
- Aliases: CALM2, CAMII, PHKD, PHKD2, LQT15, caM, calmodulin 2 (phosphorylase kinase, delta), calmodulin 2, CAMC, CAM1, CAMIII, CAM3, CALM, CALML2
- External IDs: OMIM: 114182; GeneCards: CALM2

Gene location (Human)
Chr.	Chromosome 2 (human)
Band	2p21	Start	47,160,084 bp
Band	2p21	End	47,176,921 bp
RNA expression pattern
Bgee	Human / Mouse (ortholog); Top expressed in: middle temporal gyrus; Brodmann area 23; orbitofrontal cortex; visceral pleura; pons; lateral nuclear group of thalamus; occipital lobe; germinal epithelium; parietal pleura; prefrontal cortex / n/a; More reference expression data
BioGPS	n/a
Gene ontology
Molecular function	calcium ion binding; protein binding; adenylate cyclase binding; adenylate cyclase activator activity; calcium channel inhibitor activity; protein kinase binding; protein domain specific binding; titin binding; N-terminal myristoylation domain binding; protein serine/threonine kinase activator activity; transmembrane transporter binding; metal ion binding; protein phosphatase activator activity; disordered domain specific binding; nitric-oxide synthase regulator activity; type 3 metabotropic glutamate receptor binding; phosphatidylinositol 3-kinase binding; protein N-terminus binding; calcium-dependent protein binding; nitric-oxide synthase binding
Cellular component	spindle pole; nucleus; cytoplasm; centrosome; microtubule organizing center; spindle; cytoskeleton; spindle microtubule; plasma membrane; voltage-gated potassium channel complex; sarcomere; vesicle; protein-containing complex; calcium channel complex; myelin sheath; catalytic complex; growth cone; synaptic vesicle membrane; mitochondrial membranes; neuron projection
Biological process	G2/M transition of mitotic cell cycle; regulation of heart rate; detection of calcium ion; G protein-coupled receptor signaling pathway; positive regulation of peptidyl-threonine phosphorylation; negative regulation of peptidyl-threonine phosphorylation; regulation of release of sequestered calcium ion into cytosol by sarcoplasmic reticulum; regulation of cardiac muscle contraction by regulation of the release of sequestered calcium ion; calcium-mediated signaling; substantia nigra development; positive regulation of protein autophosphorylation; regulation of cytokinesis; positive regulation of phosphoprotein phosphatase activity; positive regulation of protein dephosphorylation; positive regulation of DNA binding; positive regulation of cyclic-nucleotide phosphodiesterase activity; response to calcium ion; regulation of cardiac muscle contraction; negative regulation of ryanodine-sensitive calcium-release channel activity; positive regulation of ryanodine-sensitive calcium-release channel activity; positive regulation of protein serine/threonine kinase activity; regulation of cell communication by electrical coupling involved in cardiac conduction; response to amphetamine; activation of adenylate cyclase activity; positive regulation of nitric-oxide synthase activity; response to corticosterone; regulation of ryanodine-sensitive calcium-release channel activity; establishment of protein localization to membrane; establishment of protein localization to mitochondrial membrane; regulation of synaptic vesicle endocytosis; regulation of high voltage-gated calcium channel activity; regulation of synaptic vesicle exocytosis
Sources:Amigo / QuickGO
Orthologs
Databases	NCBI: entry; OMA: entry
Species	Human	Mouse
Entrez	805	n/a
Ensembl	ENSG00000143933	n/a
UniProt	P0DP31; P0DP24	n/a
RefSeq (mRNA)	NM_001305624; NM_001305625; NM_001305626; NM_001743	n/a
RefSeq (protein)	NP_059022; NP_001350598; NP_001350599; NP_008819; NP_001292553 NP_001292554; NP_001292555; NP_001734; NP_001316850; NP_001316851; NP_001316852; NP_001316853; NP_001316854; NP_001316855; NP_005175	n/a
Location (UCSC)	Chr 2: 47.16 – 47.18 Mb	n/a
PubMed search		n/a
- Wikidata
View/Edit Human

Calmodulin 2 is a protein that in humans is encoded by the CALM2 gene. A member of the calmodulin family of signaling molecules, it is an intermediary between calcium ions, which act as a second messenger, and many intracellular processes, such as the contraction of cardiac muscle.

== Clinical significance ==
Mutations in CALM2 are associated with cardiac arrhythmias. In particular, several single-nucleotide polymorphisms of CALM2 have been reported as potential causes of sudden infant death syndrome. Due to their heritability, CALM2 mutations can affect multiple children in a family, and the discovery of the deadly consequences of these mutations has led to challenges against the murder convictions of mothers of multiple deceased infants, as in the case of Kathleen Folbigg, acquitted after more than 20 years imprisonment, in Australia.

== Interactions ==
CALM2 has been shown to interact with AKAP9.
