= AKAP9 =

Protein-coding gene in the species Homo sapiens

Identifiers
- Aliases: AKAP9, AKAP-9, AKAP350, AKAP450, CG-NAP, HYPERION, LQT11, MU-RMS-40.16A, PPP1R45, PRKA9, YOTIAO, A-kinase anchoring protein 9
- External IDs: OMIM: 604001; GeneCards: AKAP9

Gene location (Human)
Chr.	Chromosome 7 (human)
Band	7q21.2	Start	91,940,840 bp
Band	7q21.2	End	92,110,673 bp
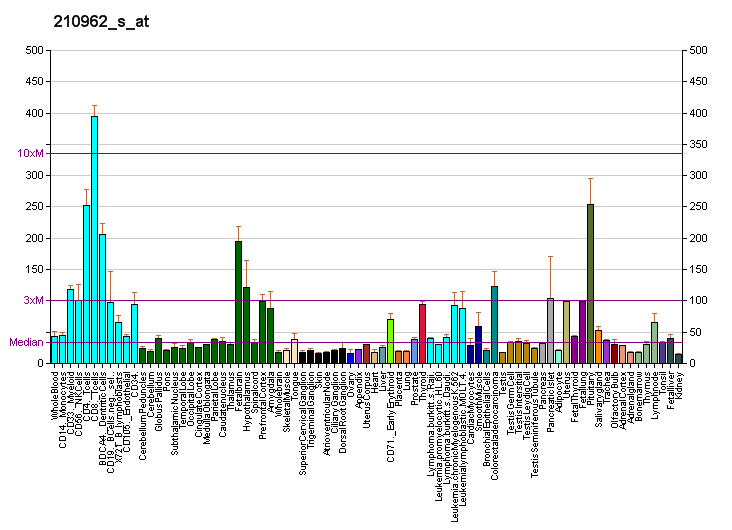
RNA expression pattern
Bgee	Human / Mouse (ortholog); Top expressed in: jejunal mucosa; bronchial epithelial cell; sural nerve; Achilles tendon; Skeletal muscle tissue of rectus abdominis; epithelium of colon; gastric mucosa; right uterine tube; Skeletal muscle tissue of biceps brachii; mucosa of paranasal sinus / n/a; More reference expression data
BioGPS	More reference expression data
Gene ontology
Molecular function	transmembrane transporter binding; potassium channel regulator activity; protein binding; molecular adaptor activity; signaling receptor binding; protein kinase A regulatory subunit binding; DNA binding; kinase activity
Cellular component	cytoplasm; cytosol; centrosome; Golgi apparatus; intracellular membrane-bounded organelle; voltage-gated potassium channel complex; cis-Golgi network; microtubule organizing center; Golgi stack; cytoskeleton; dendritic branch; synaptic membrane; soma; glutamatergic synapse; extrinsic component of postsynaptic density membrane
Biological process	positive regulation of peptidyl-serine phosphorylation; MAPK cascade; G2/M transition of mitotic cell cycle; regulation of membrane repolarization; regulation of heart rate by cardiac conduction; cellular response to cAMP; signal transduction; positive regulation of potassium ion transmembrane transporter activity; microtubule nucleation; regulation of ventricular cardiac muscle cell membrane repolarization; chemical synaptic transmission; response to electrical stimulus; negative regulation of adenylate cyclase activity; ciliary basal body-plasma membrane docking; regulation of cardiac muscle cell action potential involved in regulation of contraction; maintenance of centrosome location; regulation of G2/M transition of mitotic cell cycle; regulation of Golgi organization; positive regulation of microtubule polymerization; regulation of postsynaptic neurotransmitter receptor activity; cardiac conduction; phosphorylation
Sources:Amigo / QuickGO
Orthologs
Databases	NCBI: entry; OMA: entry
Species	Human	Mouse
Entrez	10142	n/a
Ensembl	ENSG00000127914	n/a
UniProt	Q99996; Q6PJH3	n/a
RefSeq (mRNA)	NM_005751; NM_147166; NM_147171; NM_147185; NM_001379277	n/a
RefSeq (protein)	NP_005742; NP_671714; NP_001366206; NP_005742.4; NP_671714.1	n/a
Location (UCSC)	Chr 7: 91.94 – 92.11 Mb	n/a
PubMed search		n/a
- Wikidata
View/Edit Human

A-kinase anchor protein 9 is a protein that in humans is encoded by the AKAP9 gene. AKAP9 is also known as Centrosome- and Golgi-localized protein kinase N-associated protein (CG-NAP) or AKAP350 or AKAP450

== Function ==
The A-kinase anchor proteins (AKAPs) are a group of structurally diverse proteins which have the common function of binding to the regulatory subunit of protein kinase A (PKA) and confining the holoenzyme to discrete locations within the cell. This gene encodes a member of the AKAP family. Alternate splicing of this gene results in many isoforms that localize to the centrosome and the Golgi apparatus, and interact with numerous signaling proteins from multiple signal transduction pathways. These signaling proteins include type II protein kinase A, serine/threonine kinase protein kinase N, protein phosphatase 1, protein phosphatase 2a, protein kinase C-epsilon and phosphodiesterase 4D3.

== Interactions ==
AKAP9 has been shown to interact with:

- CALM2,
- CALM1,
- FNBP1,
- KvLQT1
- PRKAR2A,
- PKN1, and
- TRIP10.
