= Drug-induced QT prolongation =

Changes to heartbeat caused by a drug

QT prolongation is a measure of delayed ventricular repolarisation, which means the heart muscle takes longer than normal to recharge between beats. It is an electrical disturbance which can be seen on an electrocardiogram (EKG). Excessive QT prolongation can trigger tachycardias such as torsades de pointes (TdP). QT prolongation is an established side effect of antiarrhythmics, but can also be caused by a wide range of non-cardiac medicines, including antibiotics, antidepressants, antipsychotics, antihistamines, opioids, and complementary medicines. On an EKG, the QT interval represents the summation of action potentials in cardiac muscle cells, which can be caused by an increase in inward current through sodium or calcium channels, or a decrease in outward current through potassium channels. By binding to and inhibiting the "rapid" delayed rectifier potassium current protein, certain drugs are able to decrease the outward flow of potassium ions and extend the length of phase 3 myocardial repolarization, resulting in QT prolongation.

== Background ==
A QT interval is a value that is measured on an electrocardiogram. Measurements begin from the start of the Q wave to the end of the T wave. The value is an indication of the time it takes for a ventricle from the beginning of a contraction to the end of relaxation. The value for a normal QT interval is similar in males and females from birth up to adolescence. During infancy, a normal QTc is defined as 400±20 milliseconds. Before puberty, the 99th percentile of QTc values is 460 milliseconds. After puberty, this value increases to 470 milliseconds in males and 480 milliseconds in females.

Torsades de pointes (TdP) is an arrhythmia. More specifically, it is one form of a polymorphic ventricular tachycardia that presents with a long QT interval. Diagnosis is made by electrocardiogram (EKG), which shows rapid irregular QRS complexes. The term "torsades de pointes" is translated from French as "twisting of the peaks" because the complexes appear to undulate, or twist around, the EKG baseline. TdP can be acquired by inheritance of a congenital long QT syndrome, or more commonly from the ingestion of a pharmacologic drug. During TdP episodes, patients have a heart rate of 200 to 250 beats/minute, which may present as palpitations or syncope. TdP often self-resolves, however, it may lead to ventricular fibrillation and cause sudden cardiac death.

== Risk factors ==
Although it is difficult to predict which individuals will be affected from drug-induced long QT syndrome, there are general risk factors that can be associated with the use of certain medications.

Generally, as the dose of a drug increases, the risk of QT prolongation increases as well. In addition, factors such as rapid infusion, concurrent use of more than one drug known to prolong QT interval, diuretic treatment, electrolyte derangements (hypokalemia, hypomagnesemia, or hypocalcemia), advanced age, bradyarrhythmias, and female sex have all been shown to be risk factors for developing drug-induced QT prolongation. TdP has been shown to occur up to three times more often in female patients compared with males, likely as a result of post-pubertal hormonal influence on cardiac ion channels. The QTc interval is longer in females, as well as having a stronger response to IKr-blocking agents. In males, the presence of testosterone upregulates IKr channels and therefore decreases QT interval. Stated otherwise, estrogens prolong the QT interval, while androgens shorten it and decrease the response to IKr-blocking agents.

Structural heart disease, such as heart failure, myocardial infarction, and left ventricular hypertrophy, are also risk factors. Diuretic-induced hypokalemia and/or hypomagnesemia taken for heart failure can induce proarrthymia. The ischemia that results from myocardial infarctions also induce QT prolongation.

=== Drugs that cause QT prolongation ===
The main groups of drugs that can cause QT prolongation are antiarrhythmic medications, psychiatric medications, and antibiotics along with other drugs like antivirals and antifungals. However, the risk of TdP from these medications vary, and are often stratified by their known risk, possible risk, or conditional risk. The FDA provides guidance on QTc prescription drug labeling.

==== Antiarrhythmic agents ====
- Class IA
  - Class IA antiarrhythmic drugs work by blocking sodium and potassium channels. Blocking sodium channels tend to shorten the action potential duration, while blocking potassium channels prolongs the action potential. When the drug concentration is at a low to normal concentration, the potassium channel blocking activity takes precedence over the sodium channel blocking activity
    - Disopyramide
    - Procainamide
    - Propafenone
    - Quinidine
      - Because of the predominance of the potassium blocking activity, TdP is seen more frequently with therapeutic levels of quinidine. Sodium blocking activity is dominant with subtherapeutic levels, which does not lead to QT prolongation and TdP.
- Class III
  - Class III antiarrhythmic drugs are potassium channel blockers that cause QT prolongation and are associated with TdP.
  - Amiodarone
    - Amiodarone works in many ways. It blocks sodium, potassium, and calcium channels, as well as alpha and beta adrenergic receptors. Because of its multiple actions, amiodarone causes QT prolongation but TdP is rarely observed.
  - Dofetilide
  - Ibutilide
    - Ibutilide differs from other class III antiarrhythmic agents in that it activates the slow, delayed inward sodium channels rather than inhibiting outward potassium channels.
  - Sotalol
    - Sotalol has beta-blocking activity. Approximately 2 to 7 percent of patients taking at least 320 mg/day experience proarrhythmia, most often in the form of TdP. The risks and effects are dose-dependent.

==== Psychiatric medications ====
Psychiatric medications include antipsychotics and antidepressants that have been shown to lengthen the QT interval and induce TdP, especially when given intravenously or in higher concentrations.

- Typical antipsychotics
  - Chlorpromazine
  - Haloperidol
    - Haloperidol functions by blocking the KCNH2 channel, the same pathway that other drug-inducing LQTS block. Patients taking haloperidol are at a higher risk if they also have electrolyte abnormalities (such as hypokalemia and/or hypomagnesemia), congenital LQTS, cardiac abnormalities, hypothyroidism, or if they are concurrently taking other medications known to lengthen the QT interval.
  - Sulpiride
  - Thioridazine (especially high risk; withdrawn by the manufacturer for this precise reason)
- Atypical antipsychotics
  - Amisulpride
  - Quetiapine
    - Overdoses on quetiapine cause QT prolongation in patients with cardiac risks.
  - Risperidone
    - Mild QT prolongation can be caused by risperidone but there are no specific drug warnings associated with this.
  - Sertindole
  - Ziprasidone
- SSRIs
  - An EKG is recommended before patients are prescribed SSRI agents citalopram and escitalopram if the prescribed dose is above 40 mg or 20 mg per day, respectively.
  - Fluoxetine
  - Paroxetine
  - Sertraline
- SNRIs
  - Venlafaxine
- Tricyclic antidepressants
  - Amitriptyline
  - Desipramine
  - Doxepin
  - Imipramine

==== Antibiotics ====
- Macrolides
  - Azithromycin
  - Clarithromycin
  - Erythromycin
    - When taken independently, erythromycin has been shown to cause both QT prolongation and TdP. Erythromycin works inhibiting the CYP3A protein. Patients who have low CYP3A activity and are also concurrently taking other medications such as disopyramide, which can lead to QT prolongation and TdP.
- Fluoroquinolones
  - Ciprofloxacin
  - Levofloxacin
  - Moxifloxacin

==== Other agents ====
Sources:

- Buprenorphine
- Chloroquine
- Cisapride
- Domperidone
- Famotidine
- Foscarnet
- Hydroxychloroquine
- Ibogaine
- Ketoconazole
- Methadone
- Octreotide
- Ondansetron
- Oxycodone
- Tramadol
- Tacrolimus
- Tamoxifen

== Pathophysiology ==
IKr (hERG) blockade
On EKG, the QT interval represents the summation of action potentials in cardiac muscle cells. QT prolongation therefore results from action potential prolongation, which can be caused by an increase in inward current through sodium or calcium channels, or a decrease in outward current through potassium channels. By binding to and inhibiting the "rapid" delayed rectifier potassium current protein, IKr, which is encoded by the hERG gene, certain drugs are able to decrease the outward flow of potassium ions and extend the length of phase 3 myocardial repolarization, which is reflected as QT prolongation.
hERG trafficking inhibition
A number of drugs that cause QT prolongation does not directly block hERG, but reduces the trafficking of the mature protein to the surface of the cell. This includes probucol, which appears to enhance the intercellular degradation of hERG; and several cardiac glycosides, which reduces trafficking due to decreased intracellular potassium. Some drugs such as ketoconazole both directly disrupt the Ikr channel and reduce its trafficking.
Growth factors
A number of antineoplastic drugs inhibit VEGF or PDGF signaling. As those growth factors are also important for the survival and renewal of cardiomyocytes, they exhibit toxicity to these cells. With some such agents, the result is QT prongation.

== Diagnosis ==
Most patients with drug-induced QT prolongation are asymptomatic and are diagnosed solely by EKG in association with a history of using medications known to cause QT prolongation. A minority of patients are symptomatic and typically present with one or more signs of arrhythmia, such as lightheadedness, syncope, or palpitations. If the arrhythmia persists, patients may experience sudden cardiac arrest.

== Management ==
Treatment requires identifying and removing any causative medications and correcting any underlying electrolyte abnormalities. While TdP often self-resolves, cardioversion may be indicated if patients become hemodynamically unstable, as evidenced by signs such as hypotension, altered mental status, chest pain, or heart failure. Intravenous magnesium sulfate has been proven to be highly effective for both the treatment and prevention of TdP.

Managing patients with TdP is dependent on the patient's stability. Vital signs, level of consciousness, and current symptoms are used to assess stability. Patients who are stable should be managed by removing the underlying cause and correcting electrolyte abnormalities, especially hypokalemia. An EKG should be obtained, a cardiac monitor should be attached, IV access should be established, supplemental oxygen should be given, and blood samples should be sent for appropriate studies. Patients should be continually re-evaluated for signs of deterioration until the TdP resolves. In addition to correcting the electrolyte abnormalities, magnesium given intravenously has also been shown to be helpful. Magnesium sulfate given as a 2 g IV bolus mixed with D5W can be given over a period of 15 minutes in patients without cardiac arrest Atrial pacing or administering isoproterenol can normalize the heart rate.

Unstable patients exhibit signs of chest pain, hypotension, elevated heart rate, and/or heart failure. Patients who develop cardiac arrest will be pulseless and unconscious. Defibrillation and resuscitation is indicated in these cases. Patients with cardiac arrest should be given IV magnesium sulfate over a period of two minutes.After diagnosing and treating the cause of LQTS, it is also important to perform a thorough history and EKG screening. Immediate family members should also be screened for inherited and congenital causes of drug-induced QT syndrome.

== Incidence ==
Unfortunately, there is no absolute definition that describes the incidence of drug-induced QT prolongation, as most data is obtained from case reports or small observational studies. Although QT interval prolongation is one of the most common reasons for drug withdrawal from the market, the overall incidence of drug-induced QT prolongation is difficult to estimate. One study in France estimated that between 5-7% of reports of ventricular tachycardia, ventricular fibrillation, or sudden cardiac death were in fact due to drug-induced QT prolongation and torsades de pointes. An observational study from the Netherlands showed that 3.1% of patients who experienced sudden cardiac death were also using a QT-prolonging drug.

== See also ==
- Long QT syndrome
- Torsades de pointes
