= Anton Jervell =

- Born: 14 June 1901; Kristiania
- Died: 29 December 1987 (aged 86)
- Occupation: Physician
- Awards: Order of St. Olav (1967)

Anton Jervell (14 June 1901 – 29 December 1987) was a Norwegian physician, politician and organizational leader.

He was born in Kristiania, a son of tax man Jakob Anton Jervell and Marie Andrea Simers. He graduated as cand.med. in 1925, and as dr. med. in 1936. He served as manager of the Vestfold Hospital from 1947. He was appointed professor at the University of Oslo, serving from 1957 to 1971. His research was primarily on heart diseases. He was decorated Knight of the Order of St. Olav in 1967.
