= Tertiapin =

Peptide from honey bee venom

Tertiapin is a 21-amino acid peptide isolated from venom of the European honey bee (Apis mellifera). It blocks two different types of potassium channels, inward rectifier potassium channels (Kir) and calcium activated large conductance potassium channels (BK).

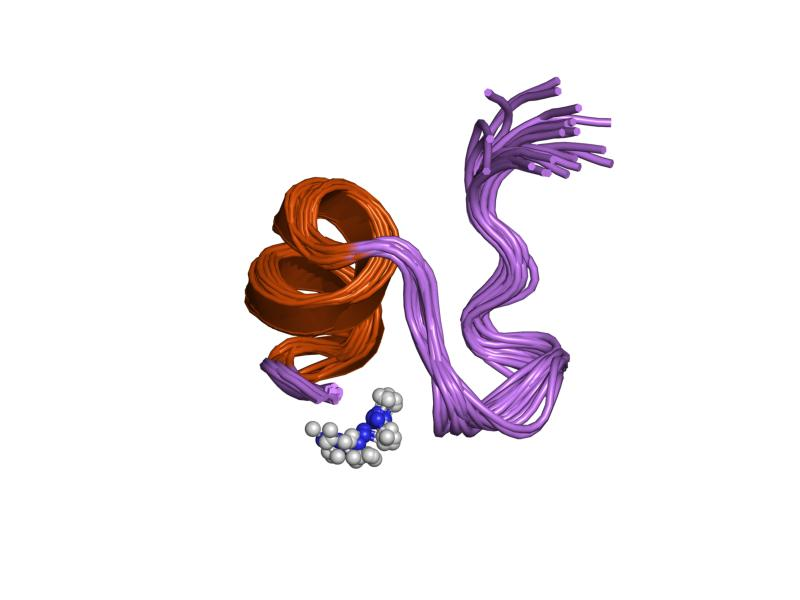
Tertiapin peptide

== Sources ==
Tertiapin is a peptidic component of the venom of the European honey bee (Apis mellifera).

== Chemistry ==
Tertiapin peptide is composed of 21 amino acids with the sequence: Ala-Leu-Cys-Asn-Cys-Asn-Arg-Ile-Ile-Ile-Pro-His-Met-Cys-Trp-Lys-Lys-Cys-Gly-Lys-Lys.
The methionine residue is sensitive to oxidation, reducing the ability to block the ionic channels. Methionine can be substituted by glutamine in order to prevent the oxidation. The new synthesized peptide is named Tertiapin-Q and does not show any functional change as compared to the original peptide, which makes it a more suitable research tool.

== Target and mode of action ==
Tertiapin has been described as a potent potassium channel blocker, acting on two different types of K+ channels.

=== Inward rectifier potassium channels ===
Tertiapin binds specifically to different subunits of the inward rectifier potassium channel (Kir), namely GIRK1 (Kir 3.1), GIRK4 (Kir 3.4) and ROMK1 (Kir 1.1), inducing a dose-dependent block of the potassium current. It is thought that tertiapin binds to the Kir channel with its α-helix situated at the C-terminal of the peptide. This α-helix is plugged into the external end of the conduction pore, thereby blocking the channel. The N-terminal of the peptide sticks out of the extracellular side. Tertiapin has a high affinity for Kir channels with approximately Kd = 8 nM for GIRK1/4 channels and Kd = 2 nM for ROMK1 channels.
In contrast to the voltage-gated K+ channels, Kir channels are more permeable to K^{+} during hyperpolarization than during depolarization. A voltage-dependent blockade by intracellular cations at voltages more positive than the K^{+} reversal potential is the mechanism underlying this feature. At more negative voltages the Kir channels are responsible for an inward K+ current. Therefore K_{ir} channels contribute to the maintenance of the resting potential, the duration of the action potential and the neuronal excitability.
GIRK1 and -4 are subunits of the muscarinic potassium channels (KACh) and have an important role in the slowing down of the heart rate in response to parasympathetic stimulation via acetylcholine. KAch channels activate during hyperpolarization, prolonging the cardiac action potential by inflow of potassium ions and reducing the frequency of action potential generation. An inhibition by tertiapin will result in a shorter cardiac action potential with loss of parasympathetic control, resulting in a faster heart rate
ROMK is found in the kidneys where it contributes to K^{+} recycling. An inhibition will result in loss of potassium, as observed in Bartter syndrome, which can be caused by mutations in the ROMK channels.

=== BK channels ===
The second type of potassium channel that tertiapin blocks is the calcium activated large conductance potassium channel (BK). The block of BK cells is voltage-, concentration- and use-dependent, meaning the blockage changes with different stimulation voltages and frequencies, different concentrations and with the duration of application of tertiapin. The IC50 for BK channels is 5.8 nM.
The BK channels have a role in the onset of the afterhyperpolarization, thereby shortening the action potential and enhancing the speed of repolarization. Total blockage by tertiapin prolongs the duration of the action potential and inhibits the afterhyperpolarization amplitude, leading to an increase of the neuronal excitability.
Tertiapin inhibits the BK channels only after a minimal stimulation of 15 minutes, in contrast with less than a minute for the GIRK channels. For this reason it is thought that the mode of action of tertiapin is different for each channel type.

== Toxicity ==
Tertiapin is a compound of the honey bee venom (apitoxin) that causes pain and signs of inflammation around the sting, but a great number of stings can be lethal (LD50 is 18-22 stings per kg for humans). An anaphylactic shock can develop if a person has an allergy to the venom. In that case even one sting can be lethal.

== Therapeutic use ==
As a paradox to the symptoms after a bee sting, bee venom is used for treatment of pain, inflammation (e.g. rheumatoid arthritis) and multiple sclerosis. Tertiapin may contribute to this effect by prolonging the depolarization phase by blocking the BK channels. Eventually this will lead to inactivation of the voltage-gated Na+ channels of the dorsal root ganglion neurons, reducing sensory transmission to the central nervous system.
Excessive stimulation with acetylcholine can induce an AV-block in the heart as shown in guinea pigs, which can be prevented by blockage of the KAch channels by tertiapin. This suggests a possible therapeutic role in excessive parasympathetic innervation or inferior myocardial infarction.
