= G protein-coupled inwardly rectifying potassium channel =

Family of ion channels

potassium inwardly rectifying channel, subfamily J, member 3

Identifiers
- Symbol: KCNJ3
- Alt. symbols: Kir3.1, GIRK1, KGA
- IUPHAR: 434
- NCBI gene: 3760
- HGNC: 6264
- OMIM: 601534
- RefSeq: NM_002239
- UniProt: P48549

Other data
- Locus: Chr. 2 q24.1
Search for
- Structures: Swiss-model
- Domains: InterPro

potassium inwardly rectifying channel, subfamily J, member 6

Identifiers
- Symbol: KCNJ6
- Alt. symbols: KCNJ7, Kir3.2, GIRK2, KATP2, BIR1, hiGIRK2
- IUPHAR: 435
- NCBI gene: 3763
- HGNC: 6267
- OMIM: 600877
- RefSeq: NM_002240
- UniProt: P48051

Other data
- Locus: Chr. 21 q22.1
Search for
- Structures: Swiss-model
- Domains: InterPro

potassium inwardly rectifying channel, subfamily J, member 9

Identifiers
- Symbol: KCNJ9
- Alt. symbols: Kir3.3, GIRK3
- IUPHAR: 436
- NCBI gene: 3765
- HGNC: 6270
- OMIM: 600932
- RefSeq: NM_004983
- UniProt: Q92806

Other data
- Locus: Chr. 1 q23.2
Search for
- Structures: Swiss-model
- Domains: InterPro

potassium inwardly rectifying channel, subfamily J, member 5

Identifiers
- Symbol: KCNJ5
- Alt. symbols: Kir3.4, CIR, KATP1, GIRK4
- IUPHAR: 437
- NCBI gene: 3762
- HGNC: 6266
- OMIM: 600734
- RefSeq: NM_000890
- UniProt: P48544

Other data
- Locus: Chr. 11 q24
Search for
- Structures: Swiss-model
- Domains: InterPro

The G protein-coupled inwardly rectifying potassium channels (GIRKs) are a family of lipid-gated inward-rectifier potassium ion channels which are activated (opened) by the signaling lipid phosphatidylinositol 4,5-bisphosphate (PIP_{2}) and a signal transduction cascade starting with ligand-stimulated G protein-coupled receptors (GPCRs). GPCRs in turn release activated G-protein βγ- subunits (G_{βγ}) from inactive heterotrimeric G protein complexes (G_{αβγ}). Finally, the G_{βγ} dimeric protein interacts with GIRK channels to open them so that they become permeable to potassium ions, resulting in hyperpolarization of the cell membrane. G protein-coupled inwardly rectifying potassium channels are a type of G protein-gated ion channels because of this direct interaction of G protein subunits with GIRK channels. The activation likely works by increasing the affinity of the channel for PIP_{2}. In high concentration PIP_{2} activates the channel absent G-protein, but G-protein does not activate the channel absent PIP_{2}.

GIRK1 to GIRK3 are distributed broadly in the central nervous system, where their distributions overlap. GIRK4, instead, is found primarily in the heart.

== Subtypes ==
protein	gene	aliases
GIRK1	KCNJ3	K_{ir}3.1
GIRK2	KCNJ6	K_{ir}3.2
GIRK3	KCNJ9	K_{ir}3.3
GIRK4	KCNJ5	K_{ir}3.4

== Examples ==
A wide variety of G protein-coupled receptors activate GIRKs, including the M_{2}-muscarinic, A_{1}-adenosine, α_{2}-adrenergic, D_{2}-dopamine, μ- δ-, and κ-opioid, 5-HT_{1A}-serotonin, somatostatin, galanin, m-Glu, GABA_{B}, TAAR1, CB_{1} and CB_{2}, and sphingosine-1-phosphate receptors.

Examples of GIRKs include a subset of potassium channels in the heart, which, when activated by parasympathetic signals such as acetylcholine through M2 muscarinic receptors, causes an outward current of potassium, which slows down the heart rate. These are called muscarinic potassium channels (I_{KACh}) and are heterotetramers composed of two GIRK1 and two GIRK4 subunits.

== Modulators ==
=== Openers ===
- 3hi2one-G4
- GAT1508
- GiGA1
- Ivermectin
- ML297 (VU0456810)
- VU0466551
- VU0529331

=== Blockers ===
- β-Hydroxybutyric acid (BHB)
- A7071
- AZD-2927 (AZD2927)
- Barium (Ba^{2+})
- Benzopyran-G1 (BP-G1)
- BAY-3670549
- Cesium (CS^{+})
- Compound 14b (Novartis)
- Dextromethorphan (DXM)
- Ifenprodil
- NIP-142
- NTC-801
- SCH-23390
- SCH-28080
- Tertiapin (tertiapin-Q)
- Tipepidine
- U-73343
