= Kir2.6 =

Protein found in humans

KCNJ18

Identifiers
- Aliases: KCNJ18, KIR2.6, TTPP2, potassium voltage-gated channel subfamily J member 18, potassium inwardly rectifying channel subfamily J member 18
- External IDs: OMIM: 613236; MGI: 108495; GeneCards: KCNJ18

Gene location (Human)
Chr.	Chromosome 17 (human)
Band	17p11.2	Start	21,692,523 bp
Band	17p11.2	End	21,704,612 bp

Gene location (Mouse)
Chr.	Chromosome 11 (mouse)
Band	11 B2|11 37.96 cM	Start	60,913,390 bp
Band	11 B2|11 37.96 cM	End	60,961,957 bp
RNA expression pattern
Bgee	Human / Mouse (ortholog); Top expressed in: skin of abdomen; skin of leg; tonsil; olfactory zone of nasal mucosa; right testis; left testis; skeletal muscle; muscle of leg; gastrocnemius muscle; vagina / Top expressed in: muscle of thigh; cerebellar cortex; lumbar spinal ganglion; sternocleidomastoid muscle; lens; triceps brachii muscle; skeletal muscle tissue; knee joint; temporal muscle; quadriceps femoris muscle; More reference expression data
BioGPS	n/a
Gene ontology
Molecular function	voltage-gated ion channel activity; inward rectifier potassium channel activity
Cellular component	integral component of membrane; plasma membrane; integral component of plasma membrane; membrane
Biological process	potassium ion transport; regulation of ion transmembrane transport; ion transport; potassium ion import across plasma membrane
Sources:Amigo / QuickGO
Orthologs
Databases	NCBI: entry; OMA: entry
Species	Human	Mouse
Entrez	100134444	16515
Ensembl	ENSG00000260458	ENSMUSG00000042529
UniProt	B7U540	P52187
RefSeq (mRNA)	NM_001194958	NM_001267593; NM_010603
RefSeq (protein)	NP_001181887	NP_001254522; NP_034733
Location (UCSC)	Chr 17: 21.69 – 21.7 Mb	Chr 11: 60.91 – 60.96 Mb
PubMed search
- Wikidata
View/Edit Human	View/Edit Mouse

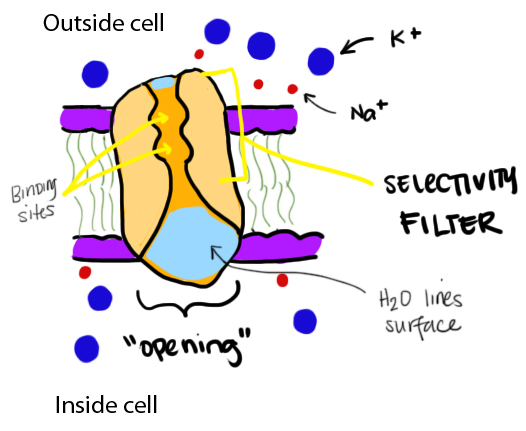

The K_{ir}2.6 also known as inward rectifier potassium channel 18 is a protein that in humans is encoded by the KCNJ18 gene. K_{ir}2.6 is an inward-rectifier potassium ion channel.

== Function ==
Inwardly rectifying potassium channels, such as K_{ir}2.6, maintain resting membrane potential in excitable cells and aid in repolarization of cells following depolarization. K_{ir}2.6 is primarily expressed in skeletal muscle and is transcriptionally regulated by thyroid hormone.

== Clinical significance ==
Mutations in this gene have been linked to thyrotoxic periodic paralysis.
