= KCNJ15 =

Protein-coding gene in the species Homo sapiens

Identifiers
- Aliases: KCNJ15, IRKK, KIR1.3, KIR4.2, potassium voltage-gated channel subfamily J member 15, potassium inwardly rectifying channel subfamily J member 15
- External IDs: OMIM: 602106; MGI: 1310000; GeneCards: KCNJ15

Gene location (Human)
Chr.	Chromosome 21 (human)
Band	21q22.13-q22.2	Start	38,155,549 bp
Band	21q22.13-q22.2	End	38,307,357 bp

Gene location (Mouse)
Chr.	Chromosome 16 (mouse)
Band	16 C4|16 55.86 cM	Start	95,058,417 bp
Band	16 C4|16 55.86 cM	End	95,101,119 bp
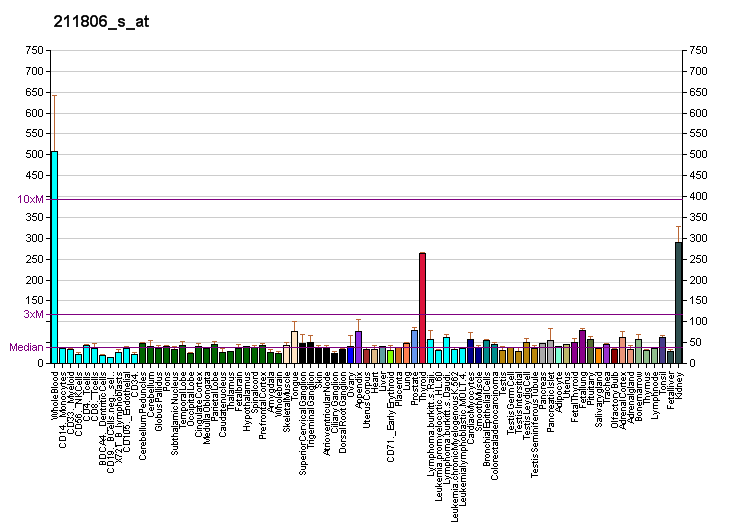

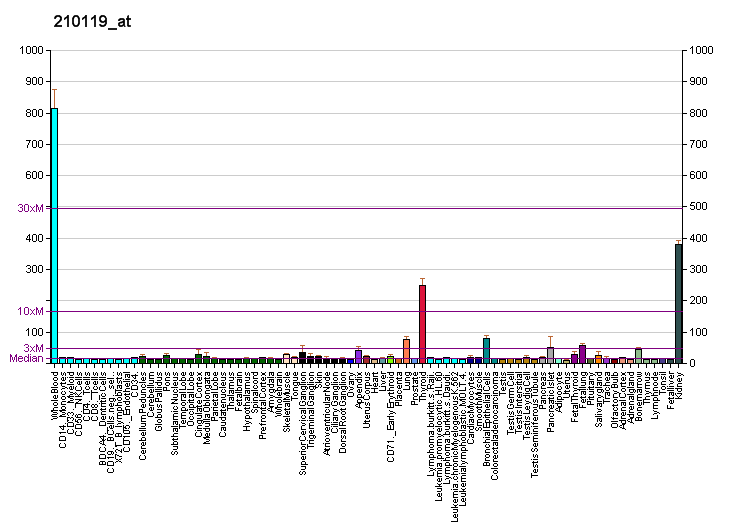
RNA expression pattern
Bgee	Human / Mouse (ortholog); Top expressed in: kidney tubule; blood; parotid gland; gingival epithelium; human kidney; glomerulus; periodontal fiber; metanephric glomerulus; visceral pleura; body of pancreas / Top expressed in: epithelium of stomach; right kidney; human kidney; proximal tubule; right lung lobe; mitral valve; left lung lobe; pharynx; ascending aorta; conjunctival fornix; More reference expression data
BioGPS	More reference expression data
Gene ontology
Molecular function	protein binding; inward rectifier potassium channel activity; voltage-gated ion channel activity; G-protein activated inward rectifier potassium channel activity
Cellular component	integral component of membrane; plasma membrane; integral component of plasma membrane; membrane
Biological process	potassium ion transport; regulation of ion transmembrane transport; ion transport; potassium ion import across plasma membrane; ion transmembrane transport; potassium ion transmembrane transport
Sources:Amigo / QuickGO
Orthologs
Databases	NCBI: entry; OMA: entry
Species	Human	Mouse
Entrez	3772	16516
Ensembl	ENSG00000157551	ENSMUSG00000062609
UniProt	Q99712	O88932
RefSeq (mRNA)	NM_001276435; NM_001276436; NM_001276437; NM_001276438; NM_001276439 NM_002243; NM_170736; NM_170737	NM_001039056; NM_001039057; NM_001271687; NM_001271689; NM_001271690 NM_001271691; NM_001271692; NM_001271693; NM_001271694; NM_001271695; NM_019664
RefSeq (protein)	NP_001263364; NP_001263365; NP_001263366; NP_001263367; NP_001263368 NP_002234; NP_733932; NP_733933	NP_001034145; NP_001034146; NP_001258616; NP_001258618; NP_001258619 NP_001258620; NP_001258621; NP_001258622; NP_001258623; NP_001258624; NP_062638
Location (UCSC)	Chr 21: 38.16 – 38.31 Mb	Chr 16: 95.06 – 95.1 Mb
PubMed search
- Wikidata
View/Edit Human	View/Edit Mouse

Potassium inwardly-rectifying channel, subfamily J, member 15, also known as KCNJ15, is a human gene, which encodes the K_{ir}4.2 protein.

== Function ==
Potassium channels are present in most mammalian cells, where they participate in a wide range of physiologic responses. K_{ir}4.2 is an integral membrane protein and inward-rectifier type potassium channel. K_{ir}4.2 has a greater tendency to allow potassium to flow into a cell rather than out of a cell. Three transcript variants encoding the same protein have been found for this gene.

The existing literature describing KCNJ15 and K_{ir}4.2 is sparse. In spite of some initial channel nomenclature confusion, in which the gene was referred to as Kir1.3 the channel was first cloned from human kidney by Shuck and coworkers in 1997. Shortly thereafter it was shown that mutation of an extracellular lysine residue resulted in 6-fold increase in K^{+} current. Two years later, in 1999, voltage clamp measurements in xenopus oocytes found that intracellular acidification decreased the potassium current of K_{ir}4.2. Also activation of protein kinase C decreased the current although in a non-reversible fashion. Furthermore, it was found that coexpression with related potassium channel K_{ir}5.1, changed these results somewhat, which the authors concluded was likely to be a result of heterodimerization. Further voltage clamp investigations found the exact pH sensitivity (pK_{a} = 7.1), open probability (high) and conductance of ~25 pS. In 2007 the channel was found to interact with the Calcium-sensing receptor in human kidney, using a yeast-two-hybrid system. This co-localization was verified at the protein level using both immunofluorescence techniques and coimmunoprecipitation of K_{ir}4.2 and the Calcium-sensing receptor. Also a mutational study of K_{ir}4.2 has demonstrated that removal of a c-terminal tyrosine increased the K^{+} current more than 10-fold. Because the channel has a very high open probability, the authors of this last article conclude that this increase is mediated by increased trafficking of the protein to the membrane and not increased single-channel conductance. This same line of reasoning is applicable to the initial work of Derst and coworkers.

== Interactions ==
KCNJ15 has been shown to interact with Interleukin 16.

== See also ==
- Inward-rectifier potassium ion channel
