= Hypokalemic periodic paralysis =

Episodes of muscular weakness due to low blood potassium levels

- Other names: hypoKPP
- This condition is inherited in an autosomal dominant manner.
- Specialty: Neurology, neuromuscular medicine

Hypokalemic periodic paralysis (hypoKPP), also known as familial hypokalemic periodic paralysis (FHPP), is a rare, autosomal dominant channelopathy characterized by muscle weakness or paralysis when there is a fall in potassium levels in the blood (hypokalemia). In individuals with this mutation, attacks sometimes begin in adolescence and most commonly occur with individual triggers such as rest after strenuous exercise (attacks during exercise are rare), high carbohydrate meals, meals with high sodium content, sudden changes in temperature, and even excitement, noise, flashing lights, cold temperatures and stress. Weakness may be mild and limited to certain muscle groups, or more severe full-body paralysis. During an attack, reflexes may be decreased or absent. Attacks may last for a few hours or persist for several days. Recovery is usually sudden when it occurs, due to release of potassium from swollen muscles as they recover. Some patients may fall into an abortive attack or develop chronic muscle weakness later in life.

Some people only develop symptoms of periodic paralysis due to hyperthyroidism (overactive thyroid). This entity is distinguished with thyroid function tests, and the diagnosis is instead called thyrotoxic periodic paralysis.

== Signs and symptoms ==
Hypokalemic periodic paralysis is a condition that causes episodes of extreme muscle weakness typically beginning in childhood or adolescence. Most often, these episodes involve a temporary inability to move muscles in the arms and legs. Attacks cause severe weakness or paralysis that usually lasts from hours to days. Some people may have episodes almost every day, while others experience them weekly, monthly, or only rarely. Attacks can occur without warning or can be triggered by factors such as rest after exercise, a viral illness, or certain medications. Often, a large, carbohydrate-rich meal or vigorous exercise in the evening can trigger an attack upon waking the following morning. Although affected individuals usually regain their muscle strength between attacks, some develop persistent muscle weakness later in life.

== Genetics ==
Mutations in the following genes can cause hypokalemic periodic paralysis:

Type	OMIM	Gene	Locus
HOKPP1	170400	CACNA1S (a voltage-gated calcium channel Ca_{v}1.1 found in the transverse tubules of skeletal muscle cells)	1q32
HOKPP2	613345	SCN4A (a voltage-gated sodium channel Na_{v}1.4 found at the neuromuscular junction)	17q23.1–q25.3
	170390	KCNJ2 (an inward-rectifier potassium channel K_{ir}2.1)	17q24.3

An association with KCNE3 (voltage-gated potassium channel) has also been described, but is currently disputed, and excluded from the disease definition in OMIM.

Action potentials from the central nervous system cause end-plate potentials at the NMJ which causes sodium ions to enter and depolarise the muscle cells. This depolarisation propagates to the T-tubules where it triggers the entry of calcium ions via Ca_{v}1.1 as well as from the sarcoplasmic reticulum through the associated ryanodine receptor RyR1. This causes contraction (tensing) of the muscle. Depolarisation of the motor end plate causes potassium ions to leave the muscle cells, repolarising the muscle and closing the calcium channels. Calcium is pumped away from the contractile apparatus and the muscle relaxes.

Mutations altering the usual structure and function of these channels therefore disrupt regulation of muscle contraction, leading to episodes of severe muscle weakness or paralysis. Mutations have been identified in arginine residues making up the voltage sensor of Na_{v}1.4. This voltage sensor comprises the S4 alpha helix of each of the four transmembrane domains (I–IV) of the protein, and contains basic residues that only allow entry of the positive sodium ions at appropriate membrane voltages by blocking or opening the channel pore. In Ca_{v}1.1, mutations have also been found in domains II and IV. These mutations are loss-of-function, such that the channels cannot open normally.

In patients with mutations in SCN4A or CACNA1S, therefore, the channel has a reduced excitability and signals from the central nervous system are unable to depolarise the muscle. As a result, the muscle cannot contract efficiently (paralysis). The condition is hypokalemic (manifests when potassium is low; not "causing hypokalemia") because a low extracellular potassium ion concentration will cause the muscle to repolarise to the resting potential more quickly, so even if calcium conductance does occur it cannot be sustained. It becomes more difficult to reach the calcium threshold at which the muscle can contract, and even if this is reached then the muscle is more likely to relax. Because of this, the severity would be reduced if potassium ion concentrations are kept high.

Mutations in KCNJ2 lead to hypokalemic periodic paralysis with cardiac arrhythmias called Andersen–Tawil syndrome.

In contrast, hyperkalemic periodic paralysis refers to gain-of-function mutations in sodium channels that maintain muscle depolarisation and therefore are aggravated by high potassium ion concentrations.

This condition is inherited in an autosomal dominant pattern (but with a high proportion of sporadic cases), which means one copy of the altered gene in each cell is sufficient to cause the disorder.

== Diagnosis ==
Diagnosis can be achieved through a specialized form of electromyographic (EMG) testing called the long exercise test. This test measures the amplitude of a nerve response (called the Compound Muscle Action Potential or CMAP) for 40 to 50 minutes following a few minutes of exercise. In affected patients, there is a progressive fall in the amplitude of the potential. Besides the patient history or a report of serum potassium low normal or low during an attack, the long exercise test is the current standard for medical testing. Genetic diagnosis is often unreliable as only a few of the more common gene locations are tested, but even with more extensive testing 20–37% of people with a clinical diagnosis of hypokalemic periodic paralysis have no known mutation in the two known genes. Standard EMG testing cannot diagnose a patient unless they are in a full blown attack at the time of testing. Provoking an attack with exercise and diet then trying oral potassium can be diagnostic, but also dangerous as this form of PP has an alternate form known as hyperkalemic periodic paralysis. The symptoms are almost the same, but the treatment is different. The old glucose insulin challenge is dangerous and risky to the point of being life-threatening and should never be done when other options are so readily available. Factors known to trigger episodes are: stress, cold environment or hypothermia, carbohydrate load, infection, glucose infusion, metabolic alkalosis, alcohol, strenuous exercise, and steroids.

People with hypokalemic periodic paralysis are often misdiagnosed as having a conversion disorder or hysterical paralysis since the weakness is muscle-based and doesn't correspond to nerve or spinal root distributions. The tendency of people with hypokalemic periodic paralysis to get paralyzed when epinephrine is released in "fight or flight" situations further adds to the temptation to misdiagnose the disorder as psychiatric.

== Treatment ==
Treatment of hypokalemic periodic paralysis focuses on preventing further attacks and relieving acute symptoms. Avoiding carbohydrate-rich meals, strenuous exercise and other identified triggers, and taking acetazolamide or another carbonic anhydrase inhibitor, may help prevent attacks of weakness. Some patients also take potassium-sparing diuretics such as spironolactone to help maintain potassium levels.

Paralysis attacks can be managed by drinking one of various potassium salts dissolved in water (debate exists over which, if any one in particular, is best used, but potassium chloride and bicarbonate are common). Rapidly absorbed boluses of liquid potassium are generally needed to abort an attack, but some patients also find positive maintenance results with time-released potassium tablets. IV potassium is seldom justified unless the patient is unable to swallow. Daily potassium dosage may need to be much higher than for potassium replacement from simple hypokalemia: 100-150 mEqs of potassium is often needed to manage daily fluctuations in muscle strength and function.

Perioperatively, prevention includes avoiding neuromuscular blockade, avoid excessive hyperventilation, warm the patient, provide adequate hydration, avoid glucose infusions, do not give diuretics, and closely monitor the electrocardiogram for signs of hypokalemia. Normal saline is the preferred IV solution for patients with familial hypokalemic periodic paralysis. Glucose containing solutions may cause weakness. Additionally, the high chloride content can cause a mild acidosis which would be preferred over alkalosis.

== Prognosis ==
The prognosis for periodic paralysis varies. Overactivity, a diet that is not low in sodium and carbohydrates, or simply an unfortunate gene mutation can lead to a type of chronic, low level weakness called an "abortive attack," or to permanent muscle damage. Abortive attacks often respond to extra potassium, cutting carbohydrates, getting plenty of rest, increasing doses of medication and gentle daily exercise such as short walks. Permanent muscle weakness is just what it sounds like: Permanent, irreparable damage to the muscles and associated weakness. Vacuoles and tubular aggregates form in and destroy healthy muscle tissue. This type of damage can typically be observed via a muscle biopsy. Not even anabolic steroids can repair this type of muscular damage.

Life span is expected to be normal, but attacks can drop potassium to levels low enough to cause life-threatening breathing problems or heart arrhythmia. Patients often report muscle pain and cognitive problems during attacks. Migraines occur in up to 50% of all hypokalemic periodic paralysis patients and may include less common symptoms like phantom smells, sensitivity to light and sound or loss of words. Medical literatures states that muscle strength is normal between attacks, but patients often report that their baseline strength is in fact lower than that of healthy individuals.

Because there are dozens of possible gene mutations, some drugs and treatments that work fine for one patient will not work for another. For example, most patients do well on acetazolamide, but some do not. Some patients will do well with extra magnesium (the body's natural ion channel blocker) or fish oil, while these same nutrients will make other patients worse. Patients and caregivers should take extreme caution with all new drugs and treatment plans.

== History ==
In 1935 the Scottish physician Dr Mary Walker was the first to recognise the association between familial periodical paralysis and hypokalaemia. She also described the glucose challenge test used in diagnosing hypokalaemic periodic paralysis and the use of intravenous potassium in its treatment.

== See also ==
- Hyperkalemic periodic paralysis
- Hypokalemic sensory overstimulation

== Sources ==
- Levitt JO (2008). "Practical aspects in the management of hypokalemic periodic paralysis". J Transl Med. 6: 18. doi:10.1186/1479-5876-6-18. PMC 2374768. PMID 18426576. by Dr Jacob O Levitt, a dermatologist who has hypokalemic periodic paralysis.
