= KCNJ13 =

Protein-coding gene in the species Homo sapiens

Identifiers
- Aliases: KCNJ13, KIR1.4, KIR7.1, LCA16, SVD, potassium voltage-gated channel subfamily J member 13, potassium inwardly rectifying channel subfamily J member 13
- External IDs: OMIM: 603208; MGI: 3781032; GeneCards: KCNJ13

Gene location (Human)
| Chr. | Chromosome 2 (human) |
| Band | 2q37.1 | Start | 232,765,802 bp |
| Band | 2q37.1 | End | 232,776,565 bp |

Gene location (Mouse)
| Chr. | Chromosome 1 (mouse) |
| Band | 1 D|1 | Start | 87,314,085 bp |
| Band | 1 D|1 | End | 87,322,451 bp |
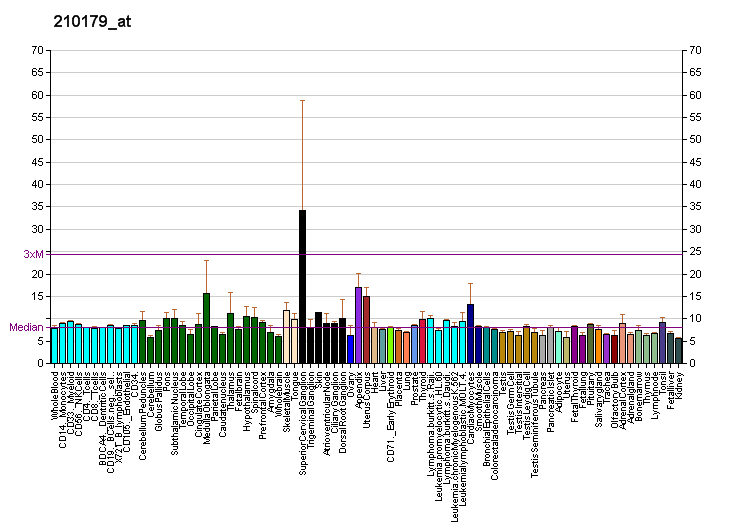

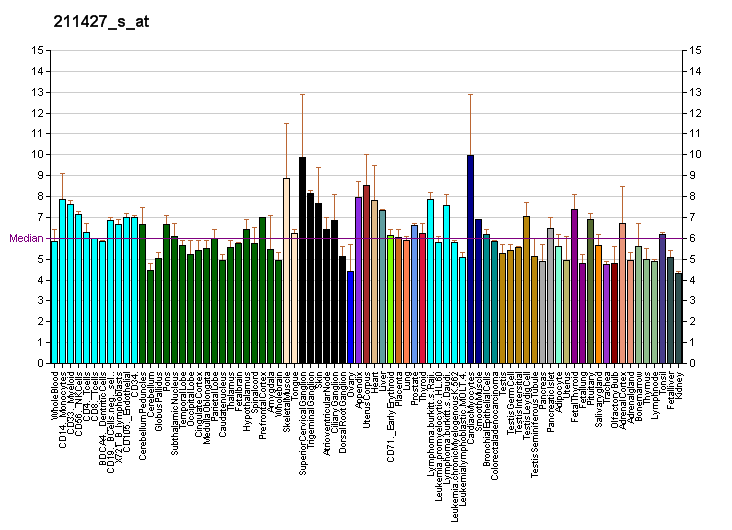
RNA expression pattern
| Bgee | Human / Mouse (ortholog); Top expressed in: Epithelium of choroid plexus; retinal pigment epithelium; jejunal mucosa; testicle; buccal mucosa cell; sural nerve; mucosa of ileum; Achilles tendon; duodenum; bone marrow cell / Top expressed in: Epithelium of choroid plexus; retinal pigment epithelium; iris; otolith organ; utricle; ciliary body; sciatic nerve; olfactory epithelium; stria vascularis; vestibular membrane of cochlear duct; More reference expression data |
| BioGPS | More reference expression data |
Gene ontology
| Molecular function | inward rectifier potassium channel activity; voltage-gated ion channel activity |
| Cellular component | integral component of membrane; integral component of plasma membrane; membrane |
| Biological process | potassium ion transport; regulation of ion transmembrane transport; ion transport; potassium ion import across plasma membrane |
Sources:Amigo / QuickGO
Orthologs
| Databases | NCBI: entry; OMA: entry |
| Species | Human | Mouse |
| Entrez | 3769 | 100040591 |
| Ensembl | ENSG00000115474 | ENSMUSG00000079436 |
| UniProt | O60928 | P86046 |
| RefSeq (mRNA) | NM_002242; NM_001172416; NM_001172417 | NM_001110227 |
| RefSeq (protein) | NP_001165887; NP_001165888; NP_002233 | NP_001103697 |
| Location (UCSC) | Chr 2: 232.77 – 232.78 Mb | Chr 1: 87.31 – 87.32 Mb |
| PubMed search |
- Wikidata
| View/Edit Human | View/Edit Mouse |

Potassium inwardly-rectifying channel, subfamily J, member 13 (KCNJ13) is a human gene encoding the K_{ir}7.1 protein.

== See also ==
- Inward-rectifier potassium ion channel
