= Hypokalemic sensory overstimulation =

- Specialty: Neurology
- Symptoms: Sensory overload, relative resistance to lidocaine local anesthesia
- Causes: Disorders of ion channels
- Differential diagnosis: Attention deficit hyperactivity disorder, pulpitis
- Treatment: Potassium gluconate, avoiding high carbohydrate meals

Hypokalemic sensory overstimulation is a neurological disorder characterized by a subjective experience of sensory overload and a relative resistance to lidocaine local anesthesia. The sensory overload is treatable with oral potassium gluconate. Individuals with this condition are sometimes diagnosed as having attention deficit hyperactivity disorder (ADHD), raising the possibility that a subtype of ADHD has a cause that can be understood mechanistically and treated in a novel way.

It is not to be confused with hot tooth syndrome.

== Cause ==
The term hypokalemic sensory overstimulation was coined by Segal and colleagues(2014) to describe a syndrome of sensory overstimulation, ineffectiveness of the local anesthetic lidocaine, and in females, premenstrual syndrome (PMS). This initial report was followed by discussion in a second article of tens of families with apparent autosomal dominant inheritance of this condition. The similarities were described clinically to ADHD and mechanistically and therapeutically to disorders of ion channels, in particular to the muscle disorder hypokalemic periodic paralysis. Some females with premenstrual syndrome may have the same autosomal dominant disorder underlying their symptoms.

== Diagnosis ==
A test for lidocaine ineffectiveness was briefly described in the 2014 paper, but the controlled trial has not yet been completed.

== Treatment ==
The use of oral potassium and avoiding high carbohydrate meals can help treat it according to recent tests, following the same approach that is standard for the muscle disease hypokalemic periodic paralysis.

Since this condition includes ineffectiveness of the sodium-channel blocker lidocaine, the amide-type local anesthetic used in dental care, articaine, was tested and found to be effective in one member of the family. No data about other local anesthetics effective in these individuals for non-dental procedures has yet been published.
