= KCNJ14 =

Protein-coding gene in the species Homo sapiens

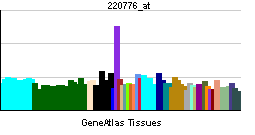

Identifiers
- Aliases: KCNJ14, IRK4, KIR2.4, potassium voltage-gated channel subfamily J member 14, potassium inwardly rectifying channel subfamily J member 14
- External IDs: OMIM: 603953; MGI: 2384820; GeneCards: KCNJ14

Gene location (Human)
Chr.	Chromosome 19 (human)
Band	19q13.33	Start	48,455,574 bp
Band	19q13.33	End	48,466,980 bp

Gene location (Mouse)
Chr.	Chromosome 7 (mouse)
Band	7|7 B3	Start	45,465,884 bp
Band	7|7 B3	End	45,474,206 bp
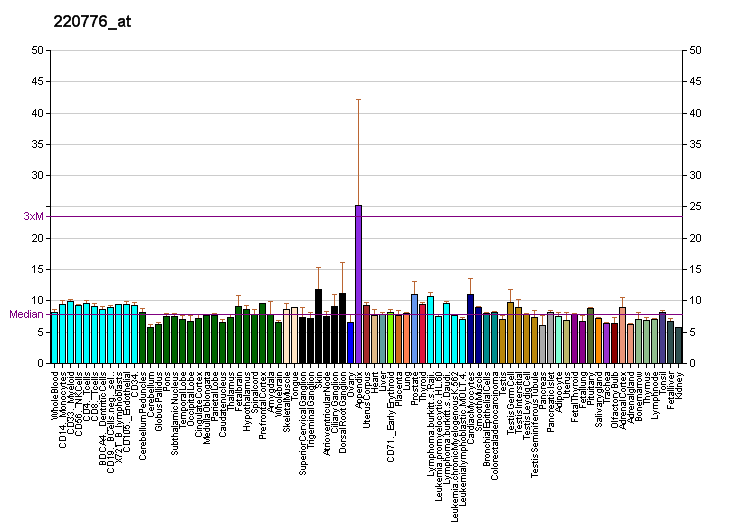
RNA expression pattern
Bgee	Human / Mouse (ortholog); Top expressed in: putamen; stromal cell of endometrium; gastrocnemius muscle; skin of leg; primary visual cortex; ventricular zone; skin of abdomen; muscle of thigh; caudate nucleus; skeletal muscle tissue / Top expressed in: layer of retina; neural layer of retina; anterior horn of spinal cord; eyelid; olfactory cortex; spinal ganglia; lower eyelid; amygdala; upper eyelid; trigeminal ganglion; More reference expression data
BioGPS	More reference expression data
Gene ontology
Molecular function	voltage-gated ion channel activity; inward rectifier potassium channel activity
Cellular component	integral component of membrane; voltage-gated potassium channel complex; soma; plasma membrane; dendrite; membrane
Biological process	potassium ion transport; regulation of ion transmembrane transport; ion transport; potassium ion import across plasma membrane; cardiac conduction
Sources:Amigo / QuickGO
Orthologs
Databases	NCBI: entry; OMA: entry
Species	Human	Mouse
Entrez	3770	211480
Ensembl	ENSG00000182324	ENSMUSG00000058743
UniProt	Q9UNX9	Q8JZN3
RefSeq (mRNA)	NM_170720; NM_013348	NM_145963
RefSeq (protein)	NP_037480	NP_666075
Location (UCSC)	Chr 19: 48.46 – 48.47 Mb	Chr 7: 45.47 – 45.47 Mb
PubMed search
- Wikidata
View/Edit Human	View/Edit Mouse

Potassium inwardly-rectifying channel, subfamily J, member 14 (KCNJ14), also known as K_{ir}2.4, is a human gene.

Potassium channels are present in most mammalian cells, where they participate in a wide range of physiologic responses. The protein encoded by this gene is an integral membrane protein and inward-rectifier type potassium channel, and probably has a role in controlling the excitability of motor neurons. Two transcript variants encoding the same protein have been found for this gene.

== See also ==
- Inward-rectifier potassium ion channel
