= Ellen Damgaard Andersen =

Physician and researcher

- Born: 10 July 1939 (age 87)

Ellen Damgaard Andersen is a Danish physician and researcher who described Andersen Syndrome. This autosomal, dominant trait and the syndrome was described as a condition where ventricular arrhythmia, with an accompanying a variant of long QT interval, periodic paralysis and distinctive physical characteristics. Along with her colleagues Peter Krasilnikoff and Hans Overad, Andersen studied the syndrome in 1971, where she oversaw the case of a young child who was experiencing episodes of paralysis and developmental irregularities.
