= Diclofenamide =

Chemical compound

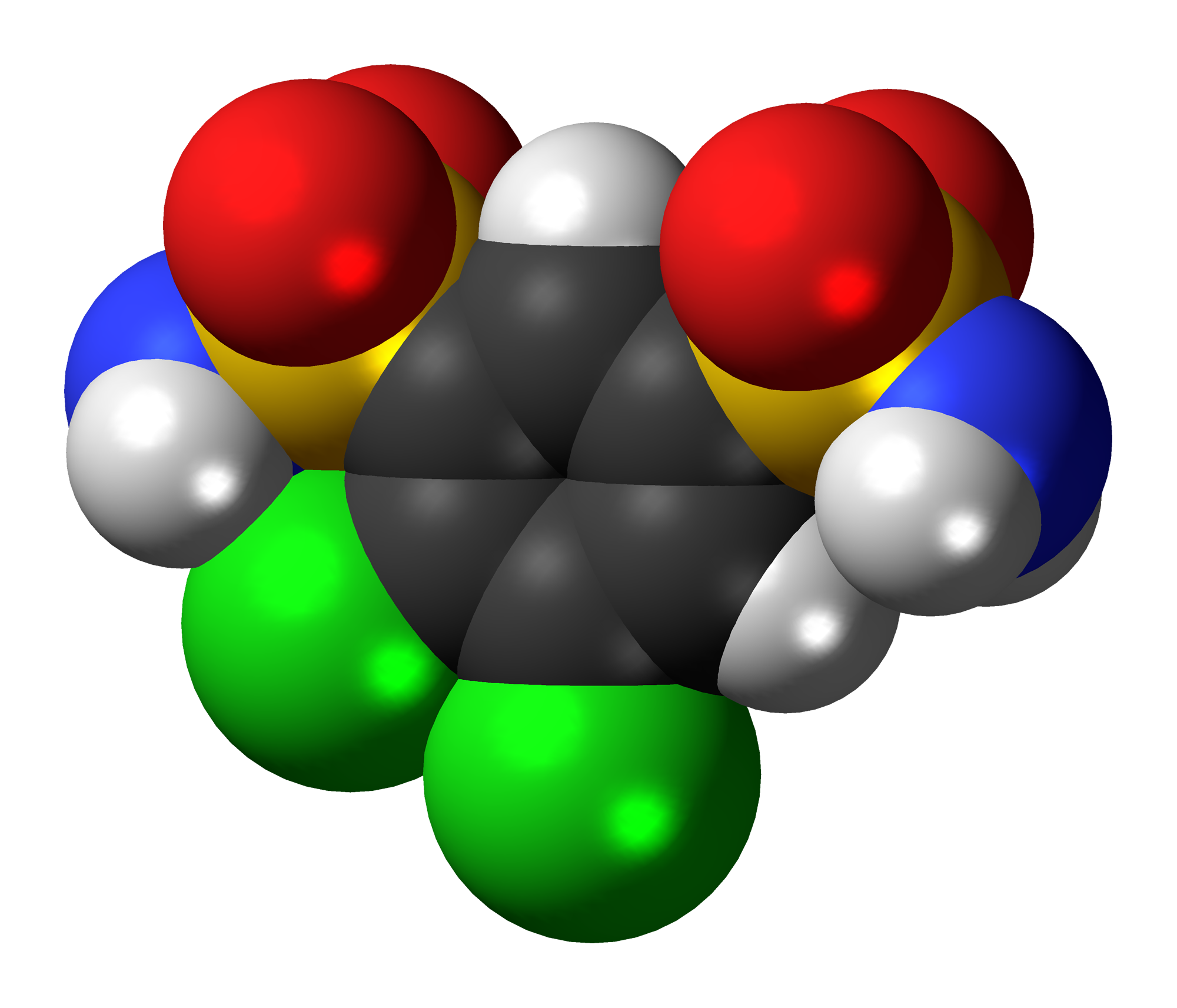

Clinical data
- AHFS/Drugs.com: International Drug Names
- MedlinePlus: a601233
- ATC code: S01EC02 (WHO)

Pharmacokinetic data
- Protein binding: 55%

Identifiers
- IUPAC name: 4,5-Dichlorobenzene-1,3-disulfonamide
- CAS Number: 120-97-8
- PubChem CID: 3038
- IUPHAR/BPS: 6807
- DrugBank: DB01144
- ChemSpider: 2930
- UNII: VVJ6673MHY
- KEGG: D00518
- ChEBI: CHEBI:101085
- ChEMBL: ChEMBL17
- CompTox Dashboard (EPA): DTXSID1022922
- ECHA InfoCard: 100.004.037

Chemical and physical data
- Formula: C_{6}H_{6}Cl_{2}N_{2}O_{4}S_{2}
- Molar mass: 305.14 g·mol^{−1}
- 3D model (JSmol): Interactive image
- Melting point: 228.5 °C (443.3 °F)
- SMILES: Clc1c(cc(cc1Cl)S(=O)(=O)N)S(=O)(=O)N
- InChI: InChI=1S/C6H6Cl2N2O4S2/c7-4-1-3(15(9,11)12)2-5(6(4)8)16(10,13)14/h1-2H,(H2,9,11,12)(H2,10,13,14); Key:GJQPMPFPNINLKP-UHFFFAOYSA-N

Diclofenamide (or dichlorphenamide) is a sulfonamide and a carbonic anhydrase inhibitor of the meta-disulfamoylbenzene class. Dichlorphenamide as a carbonic anhydrase inhibitor is used for the treatment of acute angle closure glaucoma. While Dichlorphenamide does contain two sulfate groups within the structure, it falls under the class of a first generation carbonic anhydrase Inhibitor.

== Uses ==
Diclofenamide was approved in the United States in 1958 as Daranide to treat glaucoma, Subsequently, it was found effective in cases of therapy-resistant epilepsy. In 2015, the medication was approved in the US under the name Keveyis as an orphan drug for the treatment of primary hypokalemic and hyperkalemic periodic paralysis.

== Cost ==
In 2001, diclofenamide had a U.S. list price of $50 for a bottle of 100 pills, and was approved for glaucoma. Merck discontinued diclofenamide when better glaucoma drugs were developed. In 2010, Sun Pharmaceutical Industries bought the rights. In 2015, the F.D.A. approved it as an orphan drug, with 7-year exclusive marketing rights, for periodic paralysis, which the company estimates affects 5,000 people in the U.S. In 2016, Strongbridge Biopharma acquired Sun, which raised the price to $15,001 for 100 pills. The cost of treatment would range from $109,500 to $219,000 a year. Sun gives the drug free to patients who don't have insurance.
