= Keppen–Lubinsky syndrome =

- Other names: Generalized lipodystrophy-progeroid features-severe intellectual disability syndrome
- This condition is inherited in an autosomal dominant manner

Keppen–Lubinsky syndrome is an extremely rare congenital disorder. The minimal clinical criteria for the Keppen–Lubinsky syndrome are as follows: normal growth parameters at birth, postnatal growth failure, peculiar face with an aged appearance (large prominent eyes, a narrow nasal bridge, a tented upper lip, a high palate, an open mouth), skin tightly adherent to facial bones, generalized lipodystrophy, microcephaly, and development delay. Keppen-Lubinsky syndrome is caused by mutation in the inwardly rectifying K+ channels encoded by KCNJ6 gene.
