= KCNJ9 =

Protein-coding gene in humans

Identifiers
- Aliases: KCNJ9, GIRK3, KIR3.3, potassium voltage-gated channel subfamily J member 9, potassium inwardly rectifying channel subfamily J member 9
- External IDs: OMIM: 600932; MGI: 108007; GeneCards: KCNJ9

Gene location (Human)
Chr.	Chromosome 1 (human)
Band	1q23.2	Start	160,081,538 bp
Band	1q23.2	End	160,090,563 bp

Gene location (Mouse)
Chr.	Chromosome 1 (mouse)
Band	1 H3|1 79.66 cM	Start	172,148,068 bp
Band	1 H3|1 79.66 cM	End	172,156,885 bp
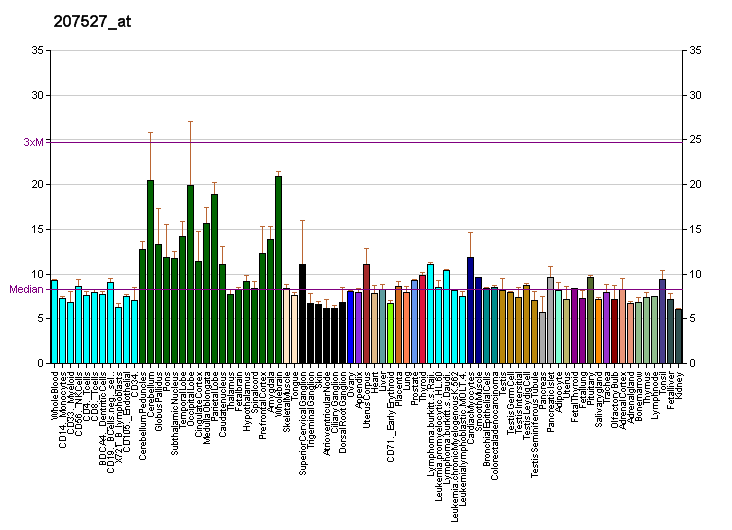
RNA expression pattern
Bgee	Human / Mouse (ortholog); Top expressed in: middle temporal gyrus; Brodmann area 23; primary visual cortex; right hemisphere of cerebellum; right frontal lobe; lateral nuclear group of thalamus; dorsolateral prefrontal cortex; superior frontal gyrus; prefrontal cortex; postcentral gyrus / Top expressed in: cerebellar vermis; medial dorsal nucleus; lateral geniculate nucleus; lobe of cerebellum; neural layer of retina; medial geniculate nucleus; cingulate gyrus; primary motor cortex; perirhinal cortex; entorhinal cortex; More reference expression data
BioGPS	More reference expression data
Gene ontology
Molecular function	protein binding; inward rectifier potassium channel activity; voltage-gated ion channel activity; G-protein activated inward rectifier potassium channel activity
Cellular component	integral component of membrane; plasma membrane; integral component of plasma membrane; membrane; parallel fiber to Purkinje cell synapse; integral component of presynaptic membrane
Biological process	potassium ion transport; regulation of ion transmembrane transport; ion transport; potassium ion import across plasma membrane
Sources:Amigo / QuickGO
Orthologs
Databases	NCBI: entry; OMA: entry
Species	Human	Mouse
Entrez	3765	16524
Ensembl	ENSG00000162728	ENSMUSG00000038026
UniProt	Q92806	P48543
RefSeq (mRNA)	NM_004983	NM_008429; NM_001360808
RefSeq (protein)	NP_004974	NP_032455; NP_001347737
Location (UCSC)	Chr 1: 160.08 – 160.09 Mb	Chr 1: 172.15 – 172.16 Mb
PubMed search
- Wikidata
View/Edit Human	View/Edit Mouse

G protein-activated inward rectifier potassium channel 3 is a protein that in humans is encoded by the KCNJ9 gene.

== Function ==
Potassium channels are present in most mammalian cells, where they participate in a wide range of physiologic responses. The protein encoded by this gene is an integral membrane protein and inward-rectifier type potassium channel. The encoded protein, which has a greater tendency to allow potassium to flow into a cell rather than out of a cell, is controlled by G-proteins. It associates with another G-protein-activated potassium channel to form a heteromultimeric pore-forming complex.

== Interactions ==
KCNJ9 has been shown to interact with KCNJ6.

== See also ==
- G protein-coupled inwardly-rectifying potassium channel
- Inward-rectifier potassium ion channel
