= Andersen–Tawil syndrome =

Rare autosomal dominant genetic disorder

- Other names: Cardiodysrhythmic potassium-sensitive periodic paralysis, long QT syndrome type 7
- This condition affects the QT interval (in blue).
- Specialty: Cardiology, Neurology
- Symptoms: Abnormal heart rhythms, periodic paralysis, characteristic physical features
- Complications: Sudden death
- Usual onset: Birth
- Duration: Lifelong
- Types: Type 1 (KCNJ2 mutation positive), Type 2 (genetic mutation not identified)
- Causes: Genetic
- Diagnostic method: Clinical, genetic testing
- Differential diagnosis: Romano-Ward syndrome, Jervell and Lange-Nielsen syndrome, Timothy syndrome
- Treatment: Medication, implantable cardioverter-defibrillator
- Medication: Flecainide, beta-blockers, acetazolamide, potassium chloride
- Frequency: 1:1,000,000

Andersen–Tawil syndrome, also called Andersen syndrome and long QT syndrome 7, is a rare genetic disorder affecting several parts of the body. The three predominant features of Andersen–Tawil syndrome include disturbances of the electrical function of the heart characterised by an abnormality seen on an electrocardiogram (a long QT interval) and a tendency to abnormal heart rhythms, physical characteristics including low-set ears and a small lower jaw, and intermittent periods of muscle weakness known as hypokalaemic periodic paralysis.

Andersen–Tawil syndrome is inherited in an autosomal dominant pattern. It is caused in most cases by a mutation in the KCNJ2 gene which encodes an ion channel that transports potassium out of cardiac muscle cells. The arrhythmias seen in the condition can be treated with flecainide or beta-blockers, but an implantable defibrillator may sometimes be required. Periodic paralysis can be treated with carbonic anhydrase inhibitors such as acetazolamide. The condition is very rare and is estimated to affect one person in every million. The three groups of features seen in this condition were first described in 1971 by Ellen Andersen, and significant contributions to its understanding were made by Rabi Tawil.

== Signs and symptoms ==
Andersen–Tawil Syndrome classically comprises three groups of features: abnormal electrical function of the heart, hypokalemic periodic paralysis, and characteristic physical features, although some of those affected will not exhibit all aspects of the condition.

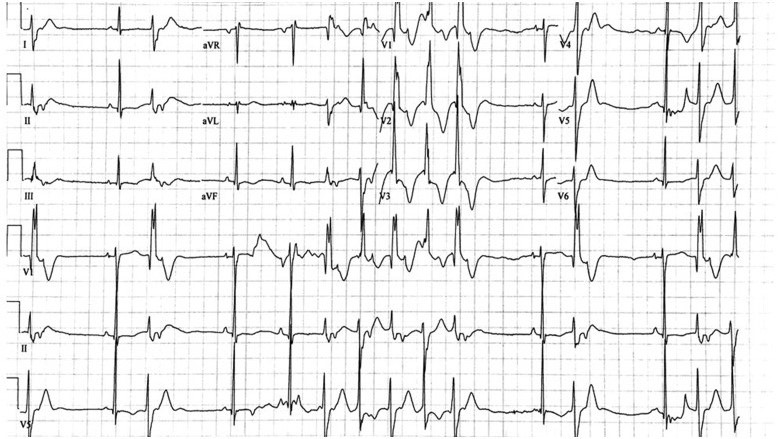
Electrocardiogram showing bidirectional Ventricular Tachycardia in a 9-year-old female with Andersen–Tawil syndrome

Andersen–Tawil syndrome affects the heart by prolonging the QT interval, a measure of how long it takes the heart to relax after each heart beat. This, as in other forms of long QT syndrome, can lead to abnormal heart rhythms such as ventricular ectopy or ventricular tachycardia causing palpitations. The ventricular tachycardia seen in Andersen–Tawil syndrome often takes a form known as bidirectional ventricular tachycardia. The arrhythmias seen in association with the condition can cause sudden cardiac death, but the risk of this is lower than in other forms of long QT syndrome.

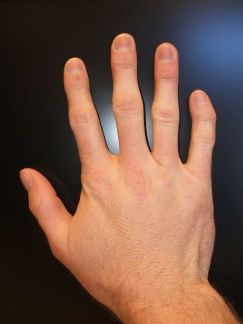
Clinodactyly – abnormal curvature of 5th finger towards 4th finger

The physical abnormalities associated with Andersen–Tawil syndrome typically affect the head, face, limbs and spine. Abnormalities of the head and face include an unusually small lower jaw (micrognathia), low-set ears, widely spaced eyes (hypertelorism), a broad forehead and nasal root, a high arched or cleft palate, and a long narrow head (scaphocephaly). Abnormalities of the limbs and spine include an abnormal curvature of the fingers, particularly the fifth finger (clinodactyly), fused fingers or toes (syndactyly), short stature, and a curved spine (scoliosis).

The third key feature of Andersen–Tawil syndrome is intermittent muscle weakness. This can last from seconds to minutes, but in some cases may last for days at a time. Weakness often occurs at times when the levels of potassium in the blood are lower than normal (hypokalaemia), and is referred to as hypokalaemic periodic paralysis. This weakness can however occur at times when potassium levels are normal, triggered by other factors including exercise, cold, or even menstruation.

== Cause ==
Andersen–Tawil syndrome is a genetic disorder which in the majority of cases is caused by mutations in the KCNJ2 gene. The condition is often inherited from a parent in an autosomal dominant manner, but may occur due to a new genetic mutation in the affected person.

Two types of Andersen–Tawil syndrome have been described, distinguished by the genetic abnormality that is detected. Type 1 Andersen–Tawil, accounting for about 60% of cases, is caused by mutations in the KCNJ2 gene. In type 2 Andersen–Tawil, accounting for about 40% of cases, a KCNJ2 mutation is not identified. Mutations in a related gene encoding a similar potassium ion channel, KCNJ5, have been identified in some of those with type 2 Andersen–Tawil, but in many cases a genetic mutation is not found.

The protein made by the KCNJ2 gene forms an ion channel that transports potassium ions into muscle cells. This specific channel (the inward rectifier potassium channel Kir2.1) carries a potassium current known as I_{K1} which is responsible for setting the resting membrane potential of muscle cells and is therefore critical for maintaining the normal functions of skeletal and cardiac muscle. Pathogenic mutations in the KCNJ2 gene alter the usual structure and function of potassium channels or prevent the channels from being inserted correctly into the cell membrane. Many mutations prevent a molecule called PIP_{2} from binding to the channels and effectively regulating their activity. These changes disrupt the flow of potassium ions, leading to the periodic paralysis and abnormal heart rhythms characteristic of Andersen–Tawil syndrome.

Type	OMIM	Gene	Notes
Type 1 Andersen–Tawil syndrome	170390	KCNJ2	Encodes inward rectifying potassium current K_{ir}2.1 carrying the potassium current I_{K1}.
Type 2 Andersen–Tawil syndrome	600734	KCNJ5	Also known as GIRK4, encodes G protein-sensitive inwardly rectifying potassium channels (K_{ir}3.4) which carry the potassium current I_{K(ACh)}.

== Mechanisms ==
Andersen–Tawil syndrome increases the risk of abnormal heart rhythms by disturbing the electrical signals that are used to coordinate individual heart cells. The genetic mutation disturbs an ion channel responsible for the flow of potassium, reducing the /_{K1} current. This prolongs of the cardiac action potential – the characteristic pattern of voltage changes across the cell membrane that occur with each heart beat, and depolarises the resting membrane potential of cardiac and skeletal muscle cells.

Cardiac and skeletal muscle cells, when relaxed, have fewer positively charged ions on the inner side of their cell membrane than on the outer side, referred to as their membranes being polarised. The main ion current responsible for maintaining this polarity is /_{K1}, and a decrease in this current leads to less polarity at rest, or a depolarised resting membrane potential. When these cells contract, positively charged ions such as sodium and calcium enter the cell through ion channels, depolarising or reversing this polarity. After a contraction has taken place, the cell restores its polarity (or repolarises) by allowing positively charged ions such as potassium to leave the cell, restoring the membrane to its relaxed, polarised state. The genetic mutation found in those with Andersen–Tawil decreases the flow of potassium, slowing the rate of repolarisation which can be seen in individual cardiac muscle cells as a longer action potential and on the surface ECG as a prolonged QT interval. Abnormally prominent U waves also arise from impaired KCNJ2 function, which slows and disrupts ventricular repolarization. This incomplete repolarization allows afterdepolarizations to occur, contributing to the characteristic arrhythmias seen in the disorder.

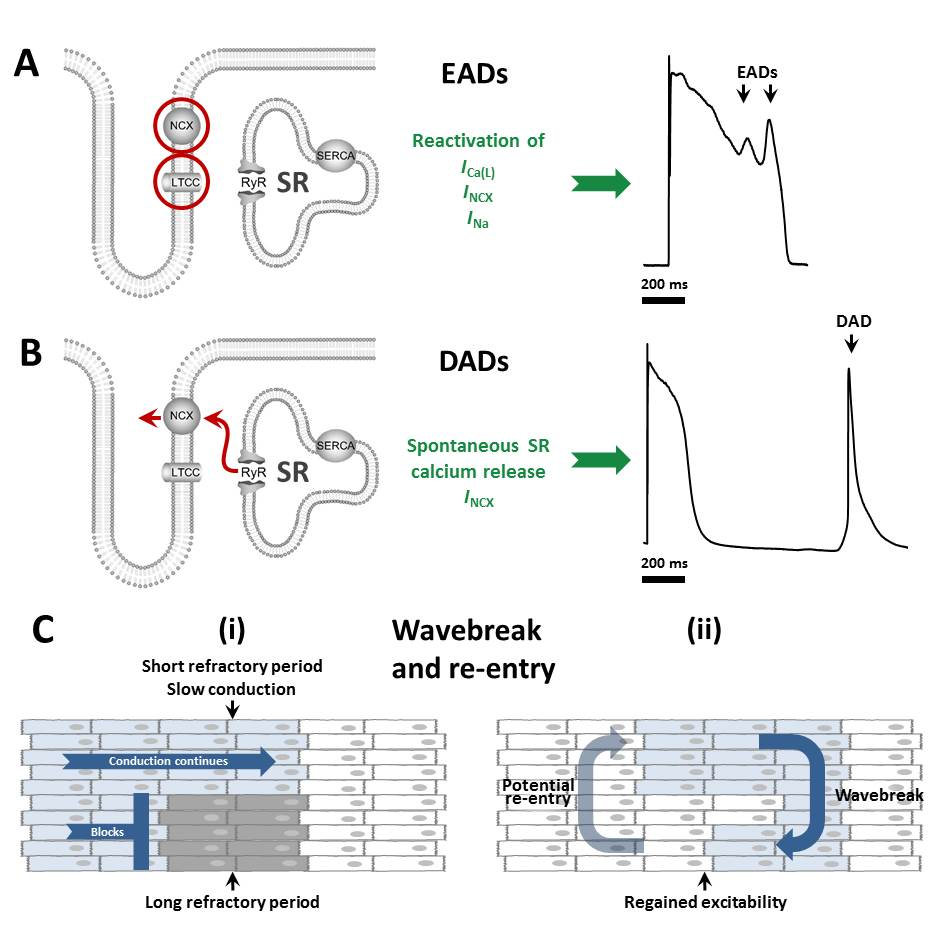
Mechanisms underlying early afterdepolarisations (EADs) and delayed afterdepolarisations (DADs) responsible for the arrhythmias seen in Andersen–Tawil syndrome

The prolonged action potentials can lead to arrhythmias through several potential mechanisms. The frequent ventricular ectopy and bidirectional VT typical of Andersen–Tawil syndrome are initiated by a triggering beat in the form of an afterdepolarisation. Early afterdepolarisations, occurring before the cell has fully repolarised, arise due to reactivation of calcium and sodium channels that would normally be inactivated until the next heartbeat is due. Under the right conditions, reactivation of these currents can cause further depolarisation of the cell, facilitated by the sodium-calcium exchanger. Early afterdepolarisations may occur as single events, but may occur repeatedly leading to multiple rapid activations of the cell. Delayed afterdepolarisations, occurring after repolarisation has completed, arise from the spontaneous release of calcium from the intracellular calcium store known as the sarcoplasmic reticulum. This calcium release then leaves the cell through the sodium calcium exchanger in exchange for sodium, generating a net inward current and depolarising the cell membrane. If this transient inward current is large enough, a premature action potential is triggered.

The muscle weakness seen in those with Andersen–Tawil syndrome arises from the depolarisation of the resting membrane potential caused by a decrease in /_{K1}. The depolarised resting membrane potential means that sodium channels which are responsible for initiating action potentials are unable to fully recover from inactivation, leading to a less excitable membrane and less forceful muscle contraction.

The mechanisms underlying the skeletal abnormalities seen in Andersen–Tawil syndrome have not been fully explained. Possibilities include impaired function of osteoclasts, cells which regulate bone growth, or disruption of the bone morphogenetic protein signalling cascade.

== Diagnosis ==
Foot with partial syndactyly – fusion of two toes

Andersen–Tawil syndrome is generally diagnosed based on symptoms, the findings on examination, and the results of an electrocardiogram. Clinical diagnostic criteria have been proposed which suggest that a diagnosis can be made if two of the following four criteria are met: (1) periodic paralysis; (2) ventricular arrhythmias (frequent ventricular ectopic beats or ventricular tachycardia), a prolonged QT interval when corrected for rate, and/or a prominent U wave; (3) at least two of the following dysmorphic features: low-set ears, wide-set eyes, a small mandible, fifth-digit clinodactyly, and syndactyly; and (4) a family member with confirmed Andersen–Tawil syndrome.

Genetic testing can be used to identify the specific mutation in an affected person, which if found can assist with screening family members. Other investigations that may be helpful in making a diagnosis include ambulatory ECG monitoring to assess for arrhythmias, measurement of blood potassium levels at baseline and during periods of weakness, and measurement of thyroid function.

=== Differential diagnosis ===
The differential diagnosis for a prolonged QT interval includes other forms of long QT syndrome such as Romano–Ward syndrome in which only the electrical activity of the heart is affected without involving any other organs; Jervell and Lange-Nielsen syndrome in which a prolonged QT interval is combined with congenital deafness; and Timothy syndrome in which a prolonged QT interval is combined with abnormalities in the structure of the heart, in addition to autism-spectrum disorder. The frequent ventricular ectopy and bidirectional ventricular tachycardia seen in Andersen–Tawil syndrome can also occur in catecholaminergic polymorphic ventricular tachycardia.

The intermittent weakness seen in Andersen–Tawil syndrome also occurs in other forms of periodic paralysis – hypokalaemic periodic paralysis, hyperkalaemic periodic paralysis, and paramyotonia congenita.

== Treatment ==
As a genetic condition, Andersen–Tawil syndrome cannot be cured. However, many of symptoms of Andersen–Tawil such as blackouts due to abnormal heart rhythms or periodic paralysis can be successfully treated with medication or implantable devices. The rarity of the condition means that many of these treatments are based on consensus opinion as there are too few patients to conduct adequately powered clinical trials.

=== General measures ===
Medications should be avoided that further prolong the QT interval such as sotalol and amiodarone as these drugs can promote abnormal heart rhythms. Lists of medications associated with prolongation of the QT interval can be found online. Drugs which reduce blood levels of potassium such as diuretics like furosemide and bendroflumethiazide should also be avoided as these can worsen the tendency to periodic paralysis and arrhythmias. Conversely, potassium-containing supplements to increase blood potassium levels may be helpful. Very strenuous or competitive sport should be discouraged as these may increase the risk of arrhythmias, although gentle exercise should be encouraged.

=== Arrhythmias ===
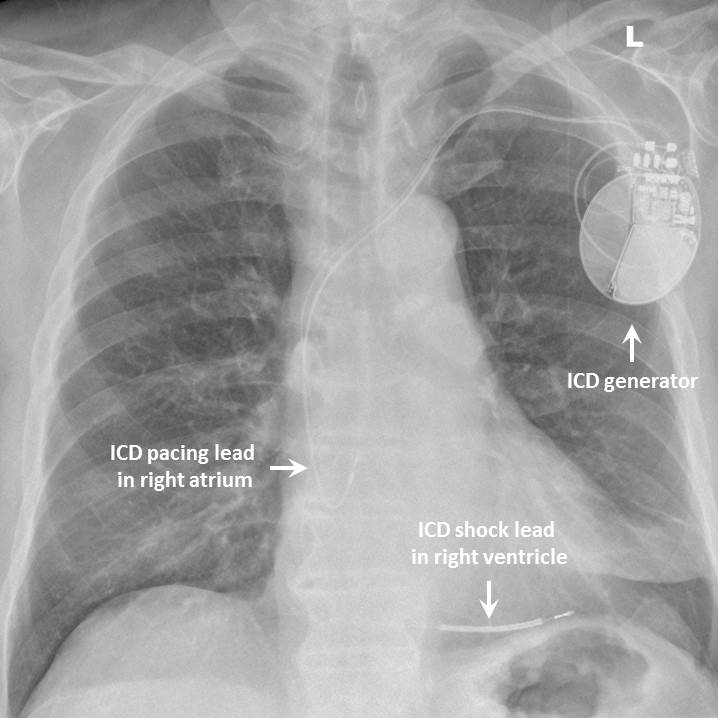
Labelled chest X-ray showing an implantable cardioverter defibrillator.

As in other forms of long QT syndrome which predispose those affected to dangerous heart rhythm disturbances, the risk of arrhythmias can be reduced by taking beta blockers such as propranolol that block the effects of adrenaline on the heart. Other antiarrhythmic drugs such as flecainide and verapamil may also be helpful. Those at highest risk of recurrent arrhythmias such as those who have already had a cardiac arrest may benefit from an implantable cardioverter defibrillator – a small device implanted under the skin which can detect dangerous arrhythmias and automatically treat them with a small electric shock.

=== Periodic paralysis ===
Periodic paralysis may be improved by taking carbonic anhydrase inhibitors such as acetazolamide.

== Epidemiology ==
Andersen–Tawil syndrome is very rare, and as of 2013 approximately 200 cases had been described in the medical literature. The condition is estimated to affect one person in every 1,000,000.

== History ==
Although a description of the condition had probably been made by Klein in 1963, Andersen–Tawil syndrome is named after Ellen Andersen who described the triad of symptoms in 1971, and Rabi Tawil who made significant contributions to the understanding of the condition in 1994.
