= Kir2.1 =

Protein-coding gene in the species Homo sapiens

KCNJ2
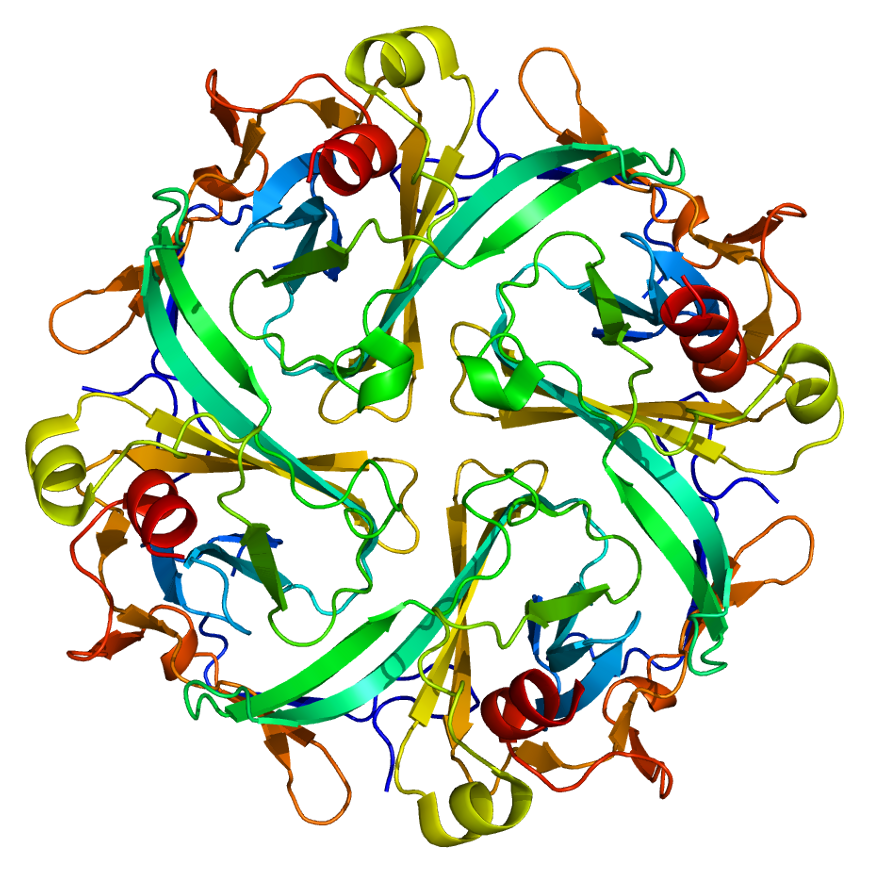

Identifiers
- Aliases: KCNJ2, ATFB9, HHBIRK1, HHIRK1, IRK1, KIR2.1, LQT7, SQT3, potassium voltage-gated channel subfamily J member 2, potassium inwardly rectifying channel subfamily J member 2
- External IDs: OMIM: 600681; MGI: 104744; GeneCards: KCNJ2

Gene location (Human)
Chr.	Chromosome 17 (human)
Band	17q24.3	Start	70,168,673 bp
Band	17q24.3	End	70,180,044 bp

Gene location (Mouse)
Chr.	Chromosome 11 (mouse)
Band	11 E2|11 75.23 cM	Start	110,956,990 bp
Band	11 E2|11 75.23 cM	End	110,967,647 bp
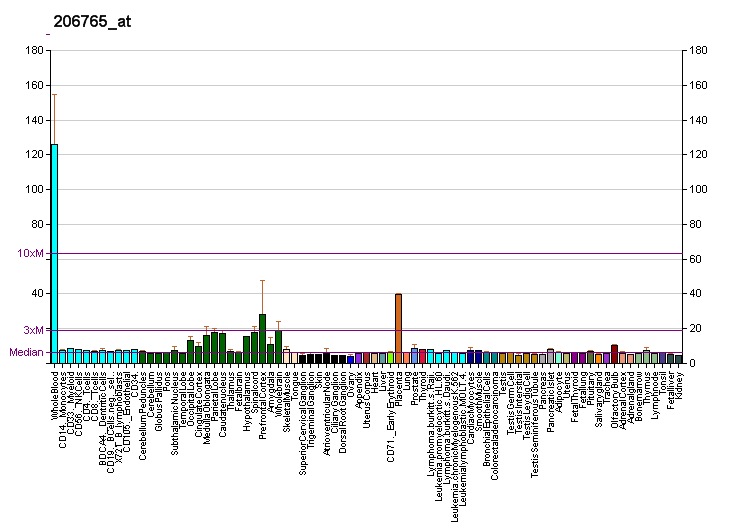
RNA expression pattern
Bgee	Human / Mouse (ortholog); Top expressed in: inferior ganglion of vagus nerve; Skeletal muscle tissue of rectus abdominis; dorsal motor nucleus of vagus nerve; Skeletal muscle tissue of biceps brachii; pons; myocardium of left ventricle; subthalamic nucleus; corpus callosum; superior vestibular nucleus; inferior olivary nucleus / Top expressed in: muscle of thigh; granulocyte; genital tubercle; superior frontal gyrus; lip; primary visual cortex; temporal muscle; dentate gyrus of hippocampal formation granule cell; esophagus; upper arm; More reference expression data
BioGPS	More reference expression data
Gene ontology
Molecular function	voltage-gated potassium channel activity involved in cardiac muscle cell action potential repolarization; voltage-gated ion channel activity; identical protein binding; phosphatidylinositol-4,5-bisphosphate binding; inward rectifier potassium channel activity; G-protein activated inward rectifier potassium channel activity
Cellular component	integral component of membrane; rough endoplasmic reticulum; Golgi apparatus; membrane; intercalated disc; T-tubule; voltage-gated potassium channel complex; plasma membrane; dendritic spine; integral component of plasma membrane; smooth endoplasmic reticulum; soma; dendrite; intrinsic component of membrane
Biological process	cardiac muscle cell action potential; regulation of ion transmembrane transport; magnesium ion transport; cardiac muscle cell action potential involved in contraction; ion transport; cellular potassium ion homeostasis; potassium ion transport; regulation of cardiac muscle cell contraction; cellular response to mechanical stimulus; membrane repolarization during action potential; potassium ion transmembrane transport; positive regulation of potassium ion transmembrane transport; regulation of skeletal muscle contraction via regulation of action potential; regulation of resting membrane potential; regulation of membrane repolarization; relaxation of skeletal muscle; regulation of heart rate by cardiac conduction; membrane repolarization during cardiac muscle cell action potential; protein homotetramerization; relaxation of cardiac muscle; membrane depolarization during cardiac muscle cell action potential; potassium ion import across plasma membrane; cardiac conduction
Sources:Amigo / QuickGO
Orthologs
Databases	NCBI: entry; OMA: entry
Species	Human	Mouse
Entrez	3759	16518
Ensembl	ENSG00000123700	ENSMUSG00000041695
UniProt	P63252	P35561
RefSeq (mRNA)	NM_000891	NM_008425
RefSeq (protein)	NP_000882	NP_032451
Location (UCSC)	Chr 17: 70.17 – 70.18 Mb	Chr 11: 110.96 – 110.97 Mb
PubMed search
- Wikidata
View/Edit Human	View/Edit Mouse

The K_{ir}2.1 inward-rectifier potassium channel is a lipid-gated ion channel encoded by the KCNJ2 gene.

== Regulation ==
Kir2.1 activity is promoted by the phospholipid PIP2.

== Clinical significance ==
A defect in this gene is associated with Andersen-Tawil syndrome.

A mutation in the KCNJ2 gene has also been shown to cause short QT syndrome.

Kir2.1 impairment has been linked to endothelial dysfunction in metabolic disease. This is thought to be due in part to impairment of the channel by fatty acids.

== In research ==
In neurogenetics, Kir2.1 is used in Drosophila research to inhibit neurons, as overexpression of this channel will hyperpolarize cells.

In optogenetics, a trafficking sequence from Kir2.1 has been added to halorhodopsin to improve its membrane localization. The resulting protein eNpHR3.0 is used in optogenetic research to inhibit neurons with light.

Expression of Kir2.1 gene in human HEK293 cells induce a transient outward current, creating a steady membrane potential close to the reversal potential of potassium.

== Interactions ==
Kir2.1 has been shown to interact with:

- DLG4,
- Interleukin 16, and
- TRAK2
