= KCNJ6 =

Protein-coding gene in the species Homo sapiens

Identifiers
- Aliases: KCNJ6, BIR1, GIRK-2, GIRK2, KATP-2, KATP2, KCNJ7, KIR3.2, hiGIRK2, KPLBS, potassium voltage-gated channel subfamily J member 6, potassium inwardly rectifying channel subfamily J member 6
- External IDs: OMIM: 600877; MGI: 104781; GeneCards: KCNJ6
Available structures
PDB	Ortholog search: PDBe RCSB
PDB	List of PDB id codes 2E4F, 3AGW, 3AT8, 3AT9, 3ATA, 3ATB, 3ATD, 3ATE, 3ATF, 3AUW, 3SYA, 3SYC, 3SYO, 3SYP, 3SYQ, 3VSQ, 4KFM

Gene location (Human)
Chr.	Chromosome 21 (human)
Band	21q22.13	Start	37,607,373 bp
Band	21q22.13	End	38,121,345 bp

Gene location (Mouse)
Chr.	Chromosome 16 (mouse)
Band	16 C4|16 55.44 cM	Start	94,549,495 bp
Band	16 C4|16 55.44 cM	End	94,798,560 bp
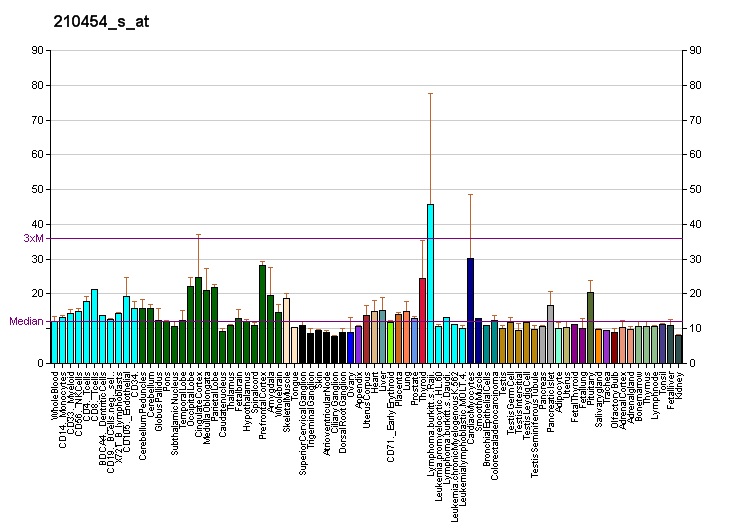
RNA expression pattern
Bgee	Human / Mouse (ortholog); Top expressed in: pars reticulata; pars compacta; middle temporal gyrus; Brodmann area 23; frontal pole; postcentral gyrus; Brodmann area 46; orbitofrontal cortex; entorhinal cortex; cerebellar vermis / Top expressed in: dentate gyrus of hippocampal formation granule cell; lumbar subsegment of spinal cord; primary visual cortex; superior frontal gyrus; pretectal area; gastrula; blastocyst; CA3 field; lumbar spinal ganglion; supraoptic nucleus; More reference expression data
BioGPS	More reference expression data
Gene ontology
Molecular function	G-protein activated inward rectifier potassium channel activity; protein binding; inward rectifier potassium channel activity; voltage-gated ion channel activity
Cellular component	integral component of membrane; voltage-gated potassium channel complex; plasma membrane; Golgi apparatus; membrane
Biological process	potassium ion transport; regulation of ion transmembrane transport; ion transport; transport; potassium ion import across plasma membrane
Sources:Amigo / QuickGO
Orthologs
Databases	NCBI: entry; OMA: entry
Species	Human	Mouse
Entrez	3763	16522
Ensembl	ENSG00000157542	ENSMUSG00000043301
UniProt	P48051	P48542
RefSeq (mRNA)	NM_002240	NM_001025584; NM_001025585; NM_001025590; NM_010606
RefSeq (protein)	NP_002231	NP_001020755; NP_001020756; NP_001020761; NP_034736
Location (UCSC)	Chr 21: 37.61 – 38.12 Mb	Chr 16: 94.55 – 94.8 Mb
PubMed search
- Wikidata
View/Edit Human	View/Edit Mouse

G protein-activated inward rectifier potassium channel 2 is a protein that in humans is encoded by the KCNJ6 gene. Mutation in KCNJ6 gene has been proposed to be the cause of Keppen-Lubinsky Syndrome (KPLBS).

== Function ==
Potassium channels are present in most mammalian cells, where they participate in a wide range of physiologic responses. The protein encoded by this gene is an integral membrane protein and inward-rectifier type potassium channel. The encoded protein, which has a greater tendency to allow potassium to flow into a cell rather than out of a cell, is controlled by G-proteins and may be involved in the regulation of insulin secretion by glucose. It associates with two other G-protein-activated potassium channels to form a heteromultimeric pore-forming complex.

== Interactions ==
KCNJ6 has been shown to interact with KCNJ9 and DLG1.

== See also ==
- G protein-coupled inwardly-rectifying potassium channel
- Inward-rectifier potassium ion channel
