= KCNJ16 =

Protein-coding gene in the species Homo sapiens

Identifiers
- Aliases: KCNJ16, BIR9, KIR5.1, potassium voltage-gated channel subfamily J member 16, potassium inwardly rectifying channel subfamily J member 16, HKTD
- External IDs: OMIM: 605722; MGI: 1314842; GeneCards: KCNJ16

Gene location (Human)
Chr.	Chromosome 17 (human)
Band	17q24.3	Start	70,053,429 bp
Band	17q24.3	End	70,135,608 bp

Gene location (Mouse)
Chr.	Chromosome 11 (mouse)
Band	11 E2|11 75.01 cM	Start	110,858,859 bp
Band	11 E2|11 75.01 cM	End	110,918,794 bp
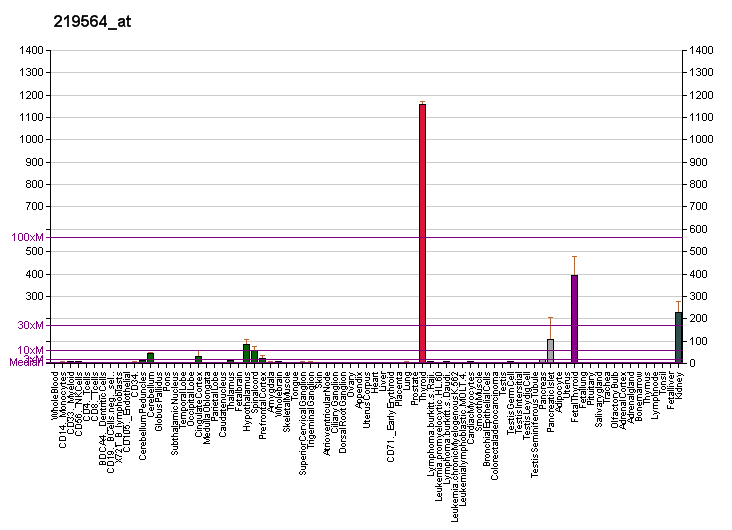
RNA expression pattern
Bgee	Human / Mouse (ortholog); Top expressed in: renal medulla; kidney tubule; caput epididymis; dorsal motor nucleus of vagus nerve; glomerulus; thyroid gland; human kidney; metanephric glomerulus; left lobe of thyroid gland; right lobe of thyroid gland / Top expressed in: human kidney; right kidney; epithelium of stomach; proximal tubule; lumbar subsegment of spinal cord; vestibular membrane of cochlear duct; otolith organ; utricle; deep cerebellar nuclei; submandibular gland; More reference expression data
BioGPS	More reference expression data
Gene ontology
Molecular function	voltage-gated ion channel activity; inward rectifier potassium channel activity; G-protein activated inward rectifier potassium channel activity
Cellular component	integral component of membrane; voltage-gated potassium channel complex; plasma membrane; basolateral plasma membrane; integral component of plasma membrane; membrane
Biological process	potassium ion transport; regulation of ion transmembrane transport; ion transport; potassium ion import across plasma membrane
Sources:Amigo / QuickGO
Orthologs
Databases	NCBI: entry; OMA: entry
Species	Human	Mouse
Entrez	3773	16517
Ensembl	ENSG00000153822	ENSMUSG00000051497
UniProt	Q9NPI9	Q9Z307
RefSeq (mRNA)	NM_001270422; NM_001291622; NM_001291623; NM_001291624; NM_001291625 NM_018658; NM_170741; NM_170742	NM_001252207; NM_001252208; NM_001252209; NM_001252210; NM_010604
RefSeq (protein)	NP_001257351; NP_001278551; NP_001278552; NP_001278553; NP_001278554 NP_061128; NP_733937; NP_733938	NP_001239136; NP_001239137; NP_001239138; NP_001239139; NP_034734
Location (UCSC)	Chr 17: 70.05 – 70.14 Mb	Chr 11: 110.86 – 110.92 Mb
PubMed search
- Wikidata
View/Edit Human	View/Edit Mouse

Potassium inwardly-rectifying channel, subfamily J, member 16 (KCNJ16) is a human gene encoding the K_{ir}5.1 protein.

Potassium channels are present in most mammalian cells, where they participate in a wide range of physiologic responses. K_{ir}5.1 is an integral membrane protein and an inward-rectifier type potassium channel. K_{ir}5.1, which has a greater tendency to allow potassium to flow into a cell rather than out of a cell, can form heterodimers with two other inward-rectifier type potassium channels. It may be involved in the regulation of fluid and pH balance. Three transcript variants encoding the same protein have been found for this gene.

== See also ==
- Inward-rectifier potassium ion channel
