= KCNJ5 =

Protein-coding gene in the species Homo sapiens

Identifiers
- Aliases: KCNJ5, CIR, GIRK4, KATP1, KIR3.4, LQT13, potassium voltage-gated channel subfamily J member 5, potassium inwardly rectifying channel subfamily J member 5
- External IDs: OMIM: 600734; MGI: 104755; GeneCards: KCNJ5

Gene location (Human)
| Chr. | Chromosome 11 (human) |
| Band | 11q24.3 | Start | 128,891,356 bp |
| Band | 11q24.3 | End | 128,921,163 bp |

Gene location (Mouse)
| Chr. | Chromosome 9 (mouse) |
| Band | 9 A4|9 17.65 cM | Start | 32,226,003 bp |
| Band | 9 A4|9 17.65 cM | End | 32,255,646 bp |
RNA expression pattern
| Bgee | Human / Mouse (ortholog); Top expressed in: buccal mucosa cell; endothelial cell; adrenal cortex; right adrenal gland; left adrenal gland; left adrenal cortex; right adrenal cortex; tendon of biceps brachii; right ventricle; myocardium / Top expressed in: atrium; atrioventricular valve; aortic valve; olfactory epithelium; endocardial cushion; right lobe of liver; myocardium of ventricle; supraoptic nucleus; right ventricle; embryo; More reference expression data |
| BioGPS | n/a |
Gene ontology
| Molecular function | G-protein activated inward rectifier potassium channel activity; protein binding; inward rectifier potassium channel activity; voltage-gated ion channel activity; voltage-gated potassium channel activity involved in atrial cardiac muscle cell action potential repolarization; voltage-gated potassium channel activity involved in ventricular cardiac muscle cell action potential repolarization |
| Cellular component | integral component of membrane; T-tubule; plasma membrane; membrane; external side of plasma membrane; voltage-gated potassium channel complex |
| Biological process | potassium ion transport; regulation of ion transmembrane transport; ion transport; regulation of heart rate by cardiac conduction; membrane repolarization during atrial cardiac muscle cell action potential; membrane repolarization during ventricular cardiac muscle cell action potential; ventricular cardiac muscle cell membrane repolarization; potassium ion import across plasma membrane |
Sources:Amigo / QuickGO
Orthologs
| Databases | NCBI: entry; OMA: entry |
| Species | Human | Mouse |
| Entrez | 3762 | 16521 |
| Ensembl | ENSG00000120457 | ENSMUSG00000032034 |
| UniProt | P48544 | P48545 |
| RefSeq (mRNA) | NM_000890; NM_001354169 | NM_010605 |
| RefSeq (protein) | NP_000881; NP_001341098 | NP_034735 |
| Location (UCSC) | Chr 11: 128.89 – 128.92 Mb | Chr 9: 32.23 – 32.26 Mb |
| PubMed search |
- Wikidata
| View/Edit Human | View/Edit Mouse |

G protein-activated inward rectifier potassium channel 4 (GIRK-4) is a protein that in humans is encoded by the KCNJ5 gene and is a type of G protein-gated ion channel.

== Function ==
Potassium channels are present in most mammalian cells, where they participate in a wide range of physiologic responses. The protein encoded by this gene is an integral membrane protein and an inward-rectifier type potassium channel. The encoded protein, which has a greater tendency to allow potassium to flow into a cell rather than out of a cell, is controlled by G-proteins. It may associate with other G-protein-activated potassium channel subunits to form a heterotetrameric pore-forming complex.

In humans KCNJ5 is mainly expressed in the adrenal gland and pituitary, although it is also detected at low levels in the pancreas, spleen, lung, heart and brain. Consistent with this expression pattern, mutations in KCNJ5/Kir3.4 can cause familial hyperaldosteronism type III and a type of long QT syndrome.

== Interactions ==
KCNJ5 has been shown to interact with KCNJ3.

== See also ==
- G protein-coupled inwardly-rectifying potassium channel
- Inward-rectifier potassium ion channel
