= KCNJ3 =

Protein-coding gene in the species Homo sapiens

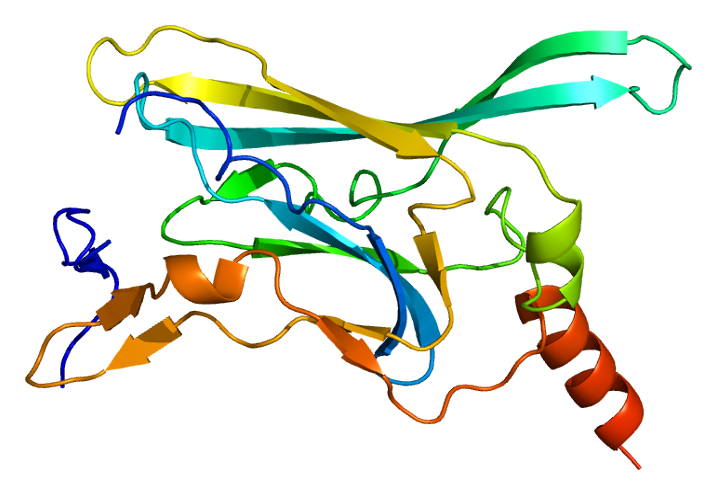

Identifiers
- Aliases: KCNJ3, GIRK1, KGA, KIR3.1, potassium voltage-gated channel subfamily J member 3, potassium inwardly rectifying channel subfamily J member 3
- External IDs: OMIM: 601534; MGI: 104742; GeneCards: KCNJ3
Available structures
PDB	Ortholog search: PDBe RCSB
PDB	List of PDB id codes 1N9P, 1U4E, 2QKS, 3K6N

Gene location (Human)
Chr.	Chromosome 2 (human)
Band	2q24.1	Start	154,697,855 bp
Band	2q24.1	End	154,858,354 bp

Gene location (Mouse)
Chr.	Chromosome 2 (mouse)
Band	2|2 C1.1	Start	55,435,970 bp
Band	2|2 C1.1	End	55,598,145 bp
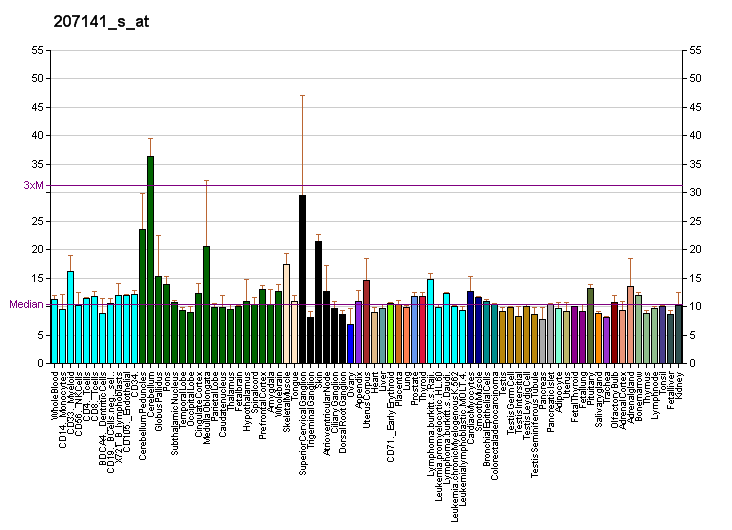

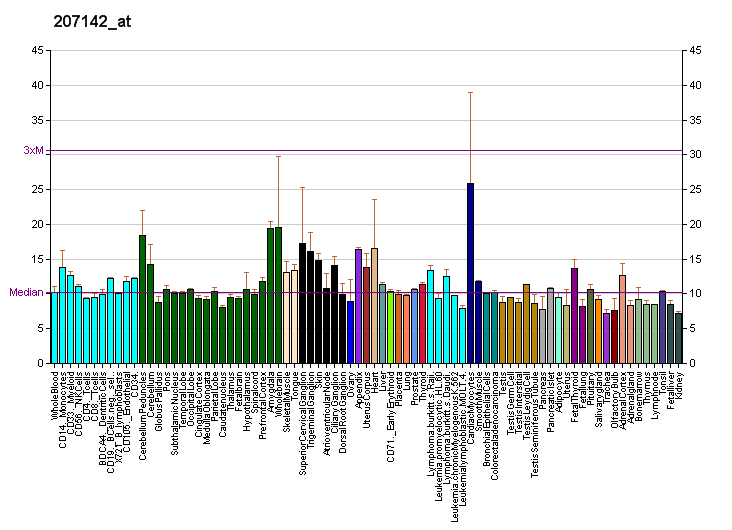
RNA expression pattern
Bgee	Human / Mouse (ortholog); Top expressed in: endothelial cell; Brodmann area 23; middle temporal gyrus; cerebellar cortex; cerebellar hemisphere; cerebellar vermis; postcentral gyrus; right hemisphere of cerebellum; primary visual cortex; superior frontal gyrus / Top expressed in: lobe of cerebellum; lateral geniculate nucleus; dentate gyrus of hippocampal formation granule cell; cerebellar vermis; superior frontal gyrus; subiculum; medial geniculate nucleus; medial dorsal nucleus; atrium; lateral septal nucleus; More reference expression data
BioGPS	More reference expression data
Gene ontology
Molecular function	G-protein activated inward rectifier potassium channel activity; protein binding; inward rectifier potassium channel activity; voltage-gated ion channel activity; voltage-gated potassium channel activity involved in atrial cardiac muscle cell action potential repolarization; voltage-gated potassium channel activity involved in ventricular cardiac muscle cell action potential repolarization
Cellular component	integral component of membrane; T-tubule; cell surface; plasma membrane; membrane; external side of plasma membrane; voltage-gated potassium channel complex; parallel fiber to Purkinje cell synapse; integral component of presynaptic membrane
Biological process	potassium ion transport; regulation of ion transmembrane transport; ion transport; response to electrical stimulus; regulation of heart rate by cardiac conduction; membrane repolarization during atrial cardiac muscle cell action potential; membrane repolarization during ventricular cardiac muscle cell action potential; ventricular cardiac muscle cell membrane repolarization; potassium ion import across plasma membrane
Sources:Amigo / QuickGO
Orthologs
Databases	NCBI: entry; OMA: entry
Species	Human	Mouse
Entrez	3760	16519
Ensembl	ENSG00000162989	ENSMUSG00000026824
UniProt	P48549	P63250
RefSeq (mRNA)	NM_002239; NM_001260508; NM_001260509; NM_001260510	NM_008426; NM_001304810; NM_001355118
RefSeq (protein)	NP_001247437; NP_001247438; NP_001247439; NP_002230	NP_001291739; NP_032452; NP_001342047
Location (UCSC)	Chr 2: 154.7 – 154.86 Mb	Chr 2: 55.44 – 55.6 Mb
PubMed search
- Wikidata
View/Edit Human	View/Edit Mouse

G protein-activated inward rectifier potassium channel 1 (GIRK-1) is encoded in the human by the gene KCNJ3.

Potassium channels are present in most mammalian cells, where they participate in a wide range of physiologic responses. The protein encoded by this gene is an integral membrane protein and inward-rectifier type potassium channel. The encoded protein, which has a greater tendency to allow potassium to flow into a cell rather than out of a cell, is controlled by G-proteins and plays an important role in regulating heartbeat. It associates with three other G-protein-activated potassium channels to form a hetero-tetrameric pore-forming complex.

== Interactions ==
KCNJ3 has been shown to interact with KCNJ5.

== See also ==
- G protein-coupled inwardly-rectifying potassium channel
- Inward-rectifier potassium ion channel
