= Inward-rectifier potassium channel =

Group of transmembrane proteins that passively transport potassium ions

Inward rectifier potassium channel
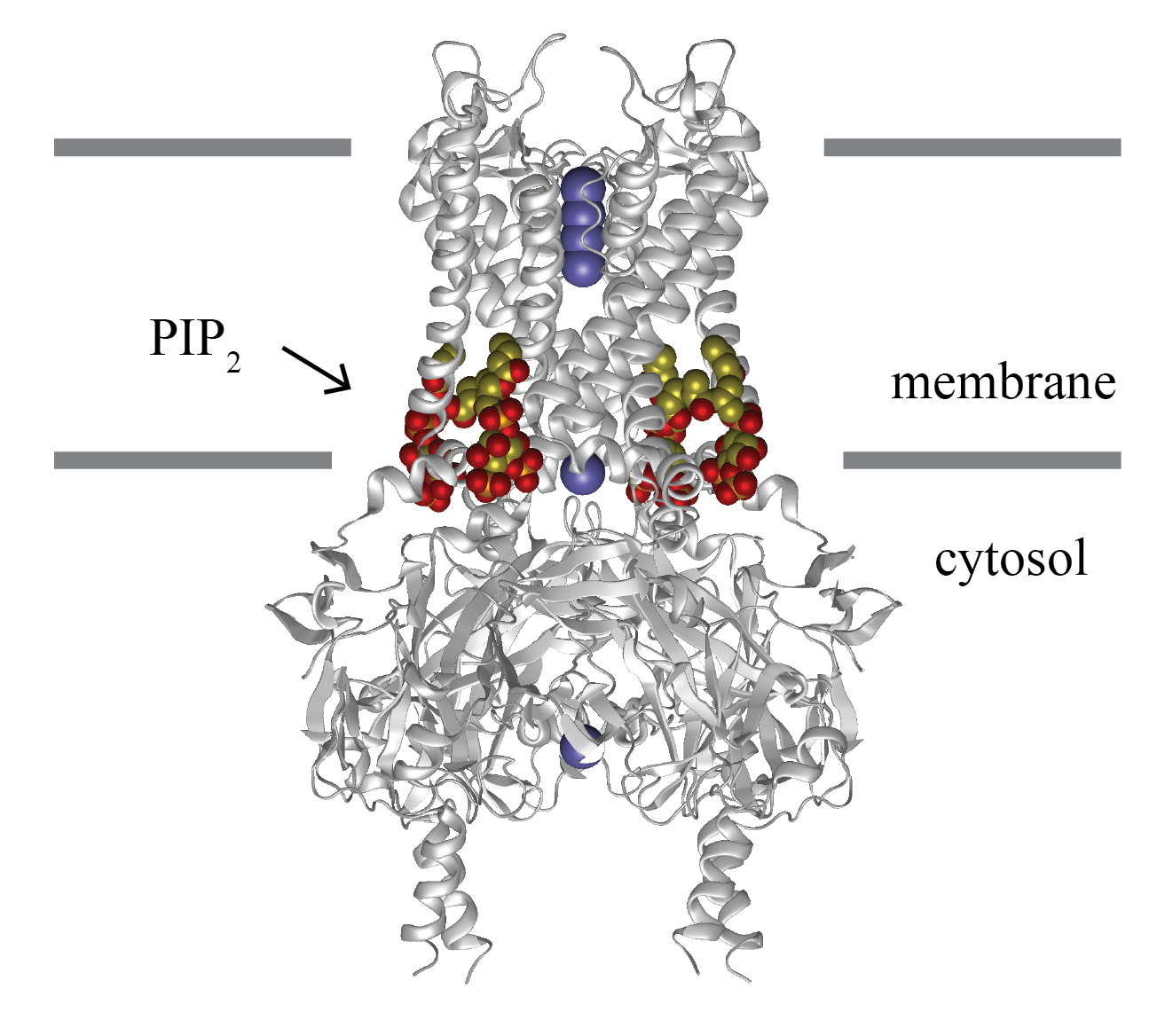
- crystal structure of an inward rectifier potassium channel

Identifiers
- Symbol: IRK
- Pfam: PF01007
- Pfam clan: CL0030
- InterPro: IPR013521
- SCOP2: 1n9p / SCOPe / SUPFAM
- TCDB: 1.A.2
- OPM superfamily: 8
- OPM protein: 3SPG
Available protein structures:
- PDB: IPR013521 PF01007 (ECOD; PDBsum)
- AlphaFold: IPR013521; PF01007

Inward-rectifier potassium channels (K_{ir}, IRK) are a specific lipid-gated subset of potassium channels. To date, seven subfamilies have been identified in various mammalian cell types, plants, and bacteria. They are activated by phosphatidylinositol 4,5-bisphosphate (PIP_{2}). The malfunction of the channels has been implicated in several diseases. IRK channels possess a pore domain, homologous to that of voltage-gated ion channels, and flanking transmembrane segments (TMSs). They may exist in the membrane as homo- or heterooligomers and each monomer possesses between 2 and 4 TMSs. In terms of function, these proteins transport potassium (K^{+}), with a greater tendency for K^{+} uptake than K^{+} export. The process of inward-rectification was discovered by Bernard Katz in skeletal muscle cells in 1949, and Denis Noble in cardiac muscle cells in 1960s.

== Overview of inward rectification ==
Figure 1. Whole-cell current recordings of K_{ir}2 inwardly-rectifying potassium channels expressed in an HEK293 cell. (This is a strongly inwardly rectifying current. Downward deflections are inward currents, upward deflections outward currents, and the x-axis is time in seconds.) There are 13 responses superimposed in this image. The bottom-most trace is current elicited by a voltage step to -60 mV, and the top-most to +60 mV, relative to the resting potential, which is close to the K^{+} reversal potential in this experimental system. Other traces are in 10 mV increments between the two.

A channel that is "inwardly-rectifying" is one that passes current (positive charge) more easily in the inward direction (into the cell) than in the outward direction (out of the cell). It is thought that this current may play an important role in regulating neuronal activity, by helping to stabilize the resting membrane potential of the cell.

By convention, inward current (positive charge moving into the cell) is displayed in voltage clamp as a downward deflection, while an outward current (positive charge moving out of the cell) is shown as an upward deflection. At membrane potentials negative to potassium's reversal potential, inwardly rectifying K^{+} channels support the flow of positively charged K^{+} ions into the cell, pushing the membrane potential back to the resting potential. This can be seen in Figure 1: when the membrane potential is clamped negative to the channel's resting potential (e.g. -60 mV), inward current flows (i.e. positive charge flows into the cell). However, when the membrane potential is set positive to the channel's resting potential (e.g. +60 mV), these channels pass very little current. Simply put, this channel passes much more current in the inward direction than the outward one, at its operating voltage range. These channels are not perfect rectifiers, as they can pass some outward current in the voltage range up to about 30 mV above resting potential.

These channels differ from the potassium channels that are typically responsible for repolarizing a cell following an action potential, such as the delayed rectifier and A-type potassium channels. Those more "typical" potassium channels preferentially carry outward (rather than inward) potassium currents at depolarized membrane potentials, and may be thought of as "outwardly rectifying." When first discovered, inward rectification was named "anomalous rectification" to distinguish it from outward potassium currents.

Inward rectifiers also differ from tandem pore domain potassium channels, which are largely responsible for "leak" K^{+} currents. Some inward rectifiers, termed "weak inward rectifiers", carry measurable outward K^{+} currents at voltages positive to the K^{+} reversal potential (corresponding to, but larger than, the small currents above the 0 nA line in figure 1). They, along with the "leak" channels, establish the resting membrane potential of the cell. Other inwardly rectifying channels, termed "strong inward rectifiers," carry very little outward current at all, and are mainly active at voltages negative to the K^{+} reversal potential, where they carry inward current (the much larger currents below the 0 nA line in figure 1).

== Mechanism of inward rectification ==
The phenomenon of inward rectification of K_{ir} channels is the result of high-affinity block by endogenous polyamines, namely spermine, as well as magnesium ions, that plug the channel pore at positive potentials, resulting in a decrease in outward currents. This voltage-dependent block by polyamines results in efficient conduction of current only in the inward direction. While the principal idea of polyamine block is understood, the specific mechanisms are still controversial.

== Activation by PIP_{2} ==
All K_{ir} channels require phosphatidylinositol 4,5-bisphosphate (PIP_{2}) for activation. PIP_{2} binds to and directly activates K_{ir} 2.2 with agonist-like properties. In this regard K_{ir} channels are PIP_{2} ligand-gated ion channels.

== Role ==
K_{ir} channels are found in multiple cell types, including macrophages, cardiac and kidney cells, leukocytes, neurons, and endothelial cells. By mediating a small depolarizing K^{+} current at negative membrane potentials, they help establish resting membrane potential, and in the case of the K_{ir}3 group, they help mediate inhibitory neurotransmitter responses, but their roles in cellular physiology vary across cell types:

Location	Function
cardiac myocytes	K_{ir} channels close upon depolarization, slowing membrane repolarization and helping maintain a more prolonged cardiac action potential. This type of inward-rectifier channel is distinct from delayed rectifier K^{+} channels, which help repolarize nerve and muscle cells after action potentials; and potassium leak channels, which provide much of the basis for the resting membrane potential.
endothelial cells	K_{ir} channels are involved in regulation of nitric oxide synthase.
kidneys	K_{ir} export surplus potassium into collecting tubules for removal in the urine, or alternatively may be involved in the reuptake of potassium back into the body.
neurons and in heart cells	G-protein activated IRKs (K_{ir}3) are important regulators, modulated by neurotransmitters. A mutation in the GIRK2 channel leads to the weaver mouse mutation. "Weaver" mutant mice are ataxic and display a neuroinflammation-mediated degeneration of their dopaminergic neurons. Relative to non-ataxic controls, Weaver mutants have deficits in motor coordination and changes in regional brain metabolism. Weaver mice have been examined in labs interested in neural development and disease for over 30 years.
pancreatic beta cells	K_{ATP} channels (composed of K_{ir}6.2 and SUR1 subunits) control insulin release.

== Regulation ==
Voltage-dependence may be regulated by external K^{+}, by internal Mg^{2+}, by internal ATP and/or by G-proteins. The P domains of IRK channels exhibit limited sequence similarity to those of the VIC family. Inward rectifiers play a role in setting cellular membrane potentials, and closing of these channels upon depolarization permits the occurrence of long duration action potentials with a plateau phase. Inward rectifiers lack the intrinsic voltage sensing helices found in many VIC family channels. In a few cases, those of Kir1.1a, Kir6.1 and Kir6.2, for example, direct interaction with a member of the ABC superfamily has been proposed to confer unique functional and regulatory properties to the heteromeric complex, including sensitivity to ATP. These ATP-sensitive channels are found in many body tissues. They render channel activity responsive to the cytoplasmic ATP/ADP ratio (increased ATP/ADP closes the channel). The human SUR1 and SUR2 sulfonylurea receptors (spQ09428 and Q15527, respectively) are the ABC proteins that regulate both the Kir6.1 and Kir6.2 channels in response to ATP, and CFTR (TC #3.A.1.208.4) may regulate Kir1.1a.

== Structure ==
The crystal structure and function of bacterial members of the IRK-C family have been determined. KirBac1.1, from Burkholderia pseudomallei, is 333 amino acyl residues (aas) long with two N-terminal TMSs flanking a P-loop (residues 1-150), and the C-terminal half of the protein is hydrophilic. It transports monovalent cations with the selectivity: K ≈ Rb ≈ Cs ≫ Li ≈ Na ≈ NMGM (protonated N-methyl-D-glucamine). Activity is inhibited by Ba^{2+}, Ca^{2+}, and low pH.

== Classification ==
There are seven subfamilies of K_{ir} channels, denoted as K_{ir}1 – K_{ir}7. Each subfamily has multiple members (i.e. K_{ir}2.1, K_{ir}2.2, K_{ir}2.3, etc.) that have nearly identical amino acid sequences across known mammalian species.

K_{ir} channels are formed from as homotetrameric membrane proteins. Each of the four identical protein subunits is composed of two membrane-spanning alpha helices (M1 and M2). Heterotetramers can form between members of the same subfamily (i.e. K_{ir}2.1 and K_{ir}2.3) when the channels are overexpressed.

=== Diversity ===
Gene	Protein	Aliases	Associated subunits
KCNJ1	K_{ir}1.1	ROMK1	NHERF2
KCNJ2	K_{ir}2.1	IRK1	K_{ir}2.2, K_{ir}4.1, PSD-95, SAP97, AKAP79
KCNJ12	K_{ir}2.2	IRK2	K_{ir}2.1 and K_{ir}2.3 to form heteromeric channel, auxiliary subunit: SAP97, Veli-1, Veli-3, PSD-95
KCNJ4	K_{ir}2.3	IRK3	K_{ir}2.1 and K_{ir}2.3 to form heteromeric channel, PSD-95, Chapsyn-110/PSD-93
KCNJ14	K_{ir}2.4	IRK4	K_{ir}2.1 to form heteromeric channel
KCNJ3	K_{ir}3.1	GIRK1, KGA	K_{ir}3.2, K_{ir}3.4, K_{ir}3.5, K_{ir}3.1 is not functional by itself
KCNJ6	K_{ir}3.2	GIRK2	K_{ir}3.1, K_{ir}3.3, K_{ir}3.4 to form heteromeric channel
KCNJ9	K_{ir}3.3	GIRK3	K_{ir}3.1, K_{ir}3.2 to form heteromeric channel
KCNJ5	K_{ir}3.4	GIRK4	K_{ir}3.1, K_{ir}3.2, K_{ir}3.3
KCNJ10	K_{ir}4.1	K_{ir}1.2	K_{ir}4.2, K_{ir}5.1, and K_{ir}2.1 to form heteromeric channels
KCNJ15	K_{ir}4.2	K_{ir}1.3	
KCNJ16	K_{ir}5.1	BIR 9	
KCNJ8	K_{ir}6.1	K_{ATP}	SUR2B
KCNJ11	K_{ir}6.2	K_{ATP}	SUR1, SUR2A, and SUR2B
KCNJ13	K_{ir}7.1	K_{ir}1.4	

== Diseases related to K_{ir} channels ==
- Persistent hyperinsulinemic hypoglycemia of infancy is related to autosomal recessive mutations in K_{ir}6.2. Certain mutations of this gene diminish the channel's ability to regulate insulin secretion, leading to hypoglycemia.
- Bartter's syndrome can be caused by mutations in K_{ir} channels. This condition is characterized by the inability of kidneys to recycle potassium, causing low levels of potassium in the body.
- Andersen's syndrome is a rare condition caused by multiple mutations of K_{ir}2.1. Depending on the mutation, it can be dominant or recessive. It is characterized by periodic paralysis, cardiac arrhythmias and dysmorphic features. (See also KCNJ2)
- Barium poisoning is likely due to its ability to block K_{ir} channels.
- Atherosclerosis (heart disease) may be related to K_{ir} channels. The loss of K_{ir} currents in endothelial cells is one of the first known indicators of atherogenesis (the beginning of heart disease).
- Thyrotoxic hypokalaemic periodic paralysis has been linked to altered K_{ir}2.6 function.
- EAST/SeSAME syndrome is caused by mutations in KCNJ10.

== See also ==
- G protein-coupled inwardly-rectifying potassium channel
- hERG
- Transporter Classification Database
