= SGK1 =

Protein-coding gene in humans

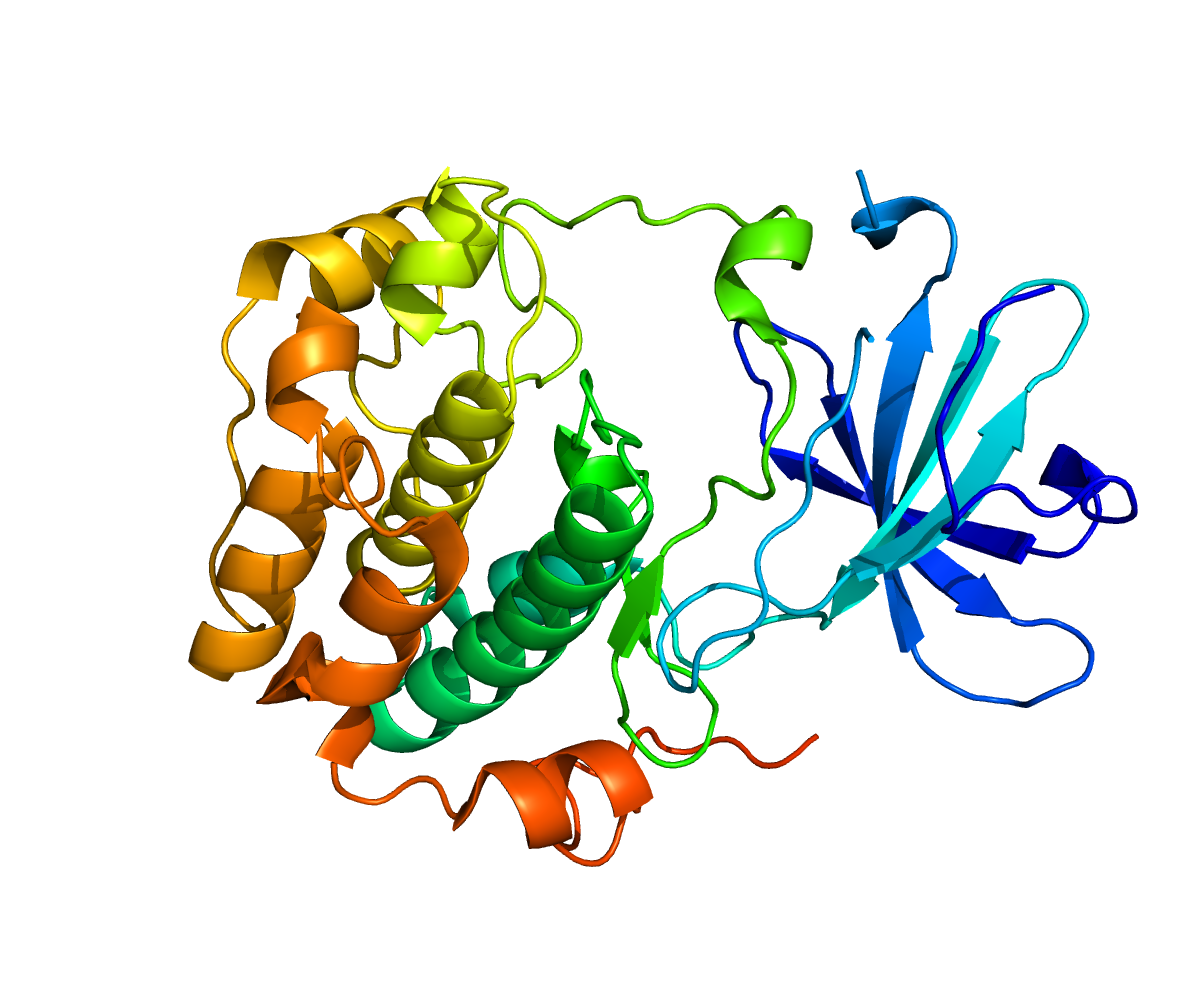

Identifiers
- Aliases: SGK1, SGK, serum/glucocorticoid regulated kinase 1
- External IDs: OMIM: 602958; MGI: 1340062; GeneCards: SGK1
Available structures
PDB	Ortholog search: PDBe RCSB
PDB	List of PDB id codes 2R5T, 3HDM, 3HDN
Enzyme activity
EC #	BRENDA	ExPASy	KEGG	MetaCyc
2.7.11.1	↗	↗	↗	↗

Gene location (Human)
Chr.	Chromosome 6 (human)
Band	6q23.2	Start	134,169,248 bp
Band	6q23.2	End	134,318,112 bp

Gene location (Mouse)
Chr.	Chromosome 10 (mouse)
Band	10|10 A3	Start	21,758,083 bp
Band	10|10 A3	End	21,875,802 bp
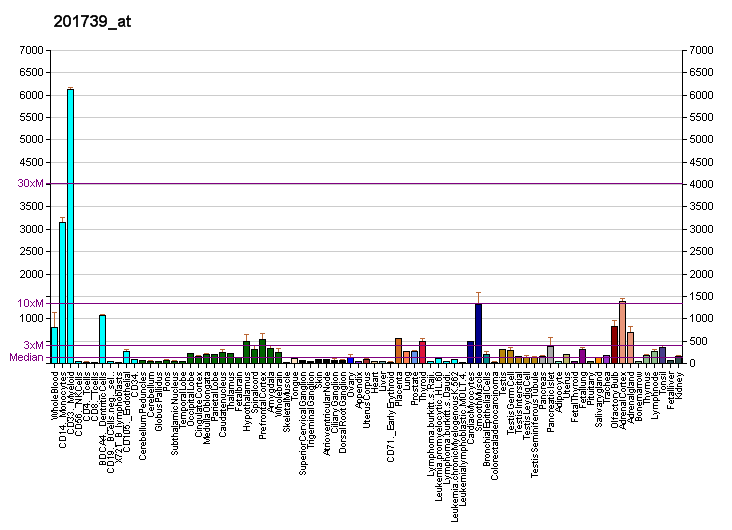
RNA expression pattern
Bgee	Human / Mouse (ortholog); Top expressed in: palpebral conjunctiva; right lung; Epithelium of choroid plexus; gingival epithelium; parietal pleura; mucosa of urinary bladder; nasal epithelium; lower lobe of lung; gallbladder; retinal pigment epithelium / Top expressed in: seminal vesicula; decidua; Epithelium of choroid plexus; gastrula; retinal pigment epithelium; iris; endothelial cell of lymphatic vessel; ciliary body; stria vascularis; triceps brachii muscle; More reference expression data
BioGPS	More reference expression data
Gene ontology
Molecular function	transferase activity; nucleotide binding; protein kinase activity; sodium channel regulator activity; calcium channel regulator activity; kinase activity; potassium channel regulator activity; protein binding; protein serine/threonine/tyrosine kinase activity; chloride channel regulator activity; ATP binding; protein serine/threonine kinase activity
Cellular component	endoplasmic reticulum membrane; membrane; plasma membrane; endoplasmic reticulum; mitochondrion; nucleus; cytoplasm; cytosol; nuclear speck
Biological process	regulation of apoptotic process; intracellular signal transduction; regulation of cell migration; positive regulation of transporter activity; phosphorylation; sodium ion transport; cellular response to DNA damage stimulus; regulation of blood pressure; protein phosphorylation; ion transmembrane transport; regulation of cell population proliferation; regulation of DNA-binding transcription factor activity; regulation of cell growth; regulation of catalytic activity; renal sodium ion absorption; regulation of gastric acid secretion; apoptotic process; peptidyl-serine phosphorylation; long-term memory; neuron projection morphogenesis
Sources:Amigo / QuickGO
Orthologs
Databases	NCBI: entry; OMA: entry
Species	Human	Mouse
Entrez	6446	20393
Ensembl	ENSG00000118515	ENSMUSG00000019970
UniProt	O00141	Q9WVC6
RefSeq (mRNA)	NM_001143676; NM_001143677; NM_001143678; NM_001291995; NM_005627	NM_001161845; NM_001161847; NM_001161848; NM_001161849; NM_001161850 NM_011361
RefSeq (protein)	NP_001137148; NP_001137149; NP_001137150; NP_001278924; NP_005618	NP_001155317; NP_001155319; NP_001155320; NP_001155321; NP_001155322 NP_035491
Location (UCSC)	Chr 6: 134.17 – 134.32 Mb	Chr 10: 21.76 – 21.88 Mb
PubMed search
- Wikidata
View/Edit Human	View/Edit Mouse

Serine/threonine-protein kinase Sgk1 also known as serum and glucocorticoid-regulated kinase 1 is an enzyme that in humans is encoded by the SGK1 gene.

SGK1 belongs to a subfamily of serine/threonine kinases that is under acute transcriptional control by several stimuli, including serum and glucocorticoids. The kinase is activated by insulin and growth factors via phosphatidylinositide-3-kinase, phosphoinositide-dependent protein kinase PDPK1 and mammalian target of rapamycin mTORC2. It has been shown to "regulate several enzymes and transcription factors; SGK1 contributes to the regulation of transport, hormone release, neuroexcitability, inflammation, cell proliferation and apoptosis". SGK1 increases the protein abundance and/or activity of a variety of ion channel, carriers, and the Na+/K+-ATPase. Over the past few years, there has been increasing evidence that SGK1 expression is regulated during both discrete developmental stages and pathological conditions such as hypertension, diabetic neuropathy, ischemia, trauma, and neurodegenerative diseases.

== Function ==
This gene encodes a serine/threonine protein kinase that plays an important role in cellular stress response. This kinase activates certain potassium, sodium, and chloride channels, suggesting an involvement in the regulation of processes such as cell survival, neuronal excitability, and renal sodium excretion.

=== Ion channel and transporter regulation ===
SGK1 has been shown to regulate the following ion channels:

- Epithelial Na^{+} channel ENaC
- Renal outer medullary K+ channel KCNJ1 (ROMK1)
- Renal epithelial Ca^{2+} channel TRPV5
- Ubiquitous Cl^{−} channel CLCN2 (ClC2)
- Cardiac voltage-gated Na^{+} channel SCN5A
- Cardiac and epithelial K^{+} channels KCNE1/KCNQ1
- Voltage-gated K^{+} channels Kv1.3, Kv1.5, and Kv4.3
- Glutamate Receptors

The following carriers and pumps are influenced by SGK1:

- Glucose Transporters
- Creatine Transporter SLC6A8 (CreaT)
- Phosphate Carrier

=== Regulation of cell volume ===
SGK1 is upregulated by osmotic and isotonic cell shrinkage. "It is tempting to speculate that SGK1-dependent regulation of cation channels contributes to the regulation of cell volume, which involves cation channels in a variety of cells". The entrance of NaCl and osmotically driven water into cells leads to an increase in the cell's regulatory cell volume. This occurs as the entrance of Na^{+} depolarizes the cell, thus allowing the parallel entrance of Cl^{−}. SGK1 has also been shown to increase the activity of cell volume-regulated Cl^{−} channel ClC2. The activation of these Cl^{−} channels result in the exit of Cl^{−} and eventually the exit of K^{+}, and the cellular loss of KCl results in a decrease of regulatory cell volume.

However, the functional significance of SGK1 in cell volume regulation, along with its stimulation of cation channels, is still not clearly understood. "Moreover, the molecular identity of the cation channels and the mechanisms of their regulation by glucocorticoids and osmotic cell shrinkage have remained elusive". The following observations seem to have conflicting results, as one suggests a role of SGK1 by cell shrinkage and regulatory cell volume increase while the other suggests regulatory cell volume decrease. It is possible that SGK1 works to maintain regulatory cell volume by increasing the cell's ability to cope with alterations in cell volume.

==== Dehydration ====
The hydration state of the brain is critical to neuronal function. One way hydration modifies cerebral function is by influencing neuronal and glial cell volume. Dehydration alters the expression of a wide variety of genes including SGK1. "It has been shown that SGK1-sensitive functions contribute significantly to the altered function of the dehydrated brain".

=== Cell proliferation and apoptosis ===
SGK1 has been shown to inhibit apoptosis. "The antiapoptotic effect of SGK1 and SGK3 has been attributed in part to phosphorylation of forkhead transcription factors". It is suggested that proliferative signals transport SGK1 into the nucleus, and the effect of SGK1 on cell proliferation may be due to its ability to regulate Kv1.3. "The upregulation of Kv1.3 channel activity may be important for the proliferative effect of growth factors, as IGF-I induced cell proliferation is disrupted by several blockers of Kv channels".

SGK1 knockout mice show seemingly normal development. "Thus SGK1 is either not a crucial element in the regulation of cell proliferation or apoptosis, or related kinase(s) can effectively replace SGK1 function in the SGK1 knockout mice".

=== Memory formation ===
It has been suggested that this kinase plays a critical role in long-term memory formation. Wild-type SGK1 improves the learning abilities of rats. On the other hand, the transfection of inactive SGK1 decreases their abilities in spatial, fear-conditioning, and novel object recognition learning.

The effect of glutamate receptors may also impact the role of SGK1 in memory consolidation. "SGK isoforms upregulate AMPA and kainate receptors and thus are expected to enhance the excitatory effects of glutamate". Synaptic transmission and hippocampal plasticity are both affected by kainate receptors. A lack of SGK may reduce glutamate clearance from the synaptic cleft leading to altered function or regulation of glutamate transporters and receptors; This could result in increasing neuroexcitotoxicity and eventually neuronal cell death.

==== Long-term potentiation ====
SGK has been shown to facilitate the expression of long-term potentiation in hippocampal neurons and neuronal plasticity. SGK mRNA expression in the hippocampus in enhanced by the AMPA receptor. Moreover, "AMPA receptor-mediated synaptic transmission is closely associated with the late phase of long-term potentiation".

=== Transcription ===
The human isoform of SGK1 has been identified as a cell volume-regulated gene that is transcriptionally upregulated by cell shrinkage. "The regulation of SGK1 transcript levels is fast; appearance and disappearance of SGK1 mRNA require <20 min". Its transcription is increasingly expressed by serum and glucocorticoids, and transcriptional changes in SGK1 expression occur in correlation with the appearance of cell death. Signaling molecules involved in transcriptional regulation of SGK1 include cAMP, p53, and protein kinase C. As SGK1 transcription is sensitive to cell volume, cerebral SGK1 expression is upregulated by dehydration.

"SGK1 expression is controlled by a large number of stimuli including serum, IFG-1, oxidative stress, cytokines, hypotonic conditions, and glucocorticoids". Mineralocorticoids, gonadotropins, fibroblast and platelet-derived growth factor, and other cytokines are also understood to stimulate SGK1 transcription. The upregulation of SGK1 in various neurodegenerative diseases correlates directly with these stimuli, as alterations in these stimuli accompany many neurodegenerative diseases.

- Glucocorticoids: SGK expression is mainly regulated by glucocorticoids. Glucocorticoids have been shown to enhance memory consolidation in a range of exercises in animals. Glucocorticoid hormones are also consistently increased in patients with severe depression. It has been shown that chronically high concentrations of glucocorticoids impair hippocampal neurogenesis by activating the glucocorticoid receptor (GR). Indeed, "SGK1 is a key enzyme involved in the downstream mechanisms by which glucocorticoids reduce neurogenesis and in the upstream potentiation and maintenance of GR function, even after glucocorticoid withdrawal".
- Oxidative Stress: Oxidative stress is a common component of the neurodegenerative process. "It has been shown to induce SGK expression through a p38/MAPK-dependent pathway, with SGK1 responding rapidly and transiently to changes in stress".
- DNA Damage: "SGK1 gene transcription is stimulated by DNA damage through p53 and activation of extracellular signal-regulated kinase (ERK1/2)".

Other stimuli include neuronal injury, neuronal excitotoxicity, increased cytosolic Ca^{2+} concentration, ischemia, and nitric oxide.

=== Metabolism ===
SGK1, along with SGK3, has been shown to stimulate the absorption of intestinal glucose by the Na^{+}-glucose cotransporter SGLT1. "SGK1 also favors cellular glucose uptake from the circulation into several tissues including brain, fat, and skeletal muscle". SGK1 also plays a critical role in the stimulation of cellular glucose uptake by insulin. Accordingly, SGK1 does not only integrate effects of mineralocorticoids and insulin on renal tubular Na^{+} transport but similarly affects glucose transport".

=== Kidney ===
By aldosterone, insulin, and IGF-I, SGK1 has been suggested to influence the regulation of ENaC and participate in the regulation of renal Na^{+} excretion. It has been indicated "that activation of ENaC by ADH or insulin depends on SGK1 and/or reflects independent pathways induced by ADH/insulin and SGK1 that converge on the same target structures". Renal ENaC function, along with renal mineralocorticoid action, is also partly dependent upon the presence of SGK1. One study also determined that SGK1 has a critical role in insulin-induced renal Na^{+} retention.

"SGK1 plays at least a dual role in mineralocorticoid-regulated NaCl homeostasis. SGK1 dependence of both NaCl intake and renal NaCl reabsorption suggests that excessive SGK1 activity leads to arterial hypertension by simultaneous stimulation of oral NaCl intake and renal NaCl retention".

=== Gastrointestinal ===
Including having a high expression in enterocytes, SGK1 is highly expressed in the gastrointestinal tract. It has been suggested that glucocorticoids are the primary stimulant of intestinal SGK1 expression. Unlike in renal function, ENaC regulation in the colon is currently not fully understood. At the current time, it seems SGK1 is not required for stimulation of ENaC in the distal colon.

=== Cardiovascular ===
The heart is one of the many tissues with high SGK1 expression. As SGK1 affects both Na^{+} intake and renal^{+} excretion, the regulation of blood pressure could be influenced by SGK1-induced salt imbalance. Activated SGK1, due to insulin, may lead to Na^{+} reabsorption and consequently higher blood pressure.

SGK1 has been shown to impact the QT interval of the heart electrical cycle. As the QT interval represents the electrical depolarization and repolarization of the left and right ventricles, "SGK1 may have the capacity to shorten Q-T". "In support of this, a gene variant of SGK1, presumably conferring enhanced SGK1 activity is indeed associated with a shortened Q-T interval in humans".

== Clinical significance ==
A gain-of-function mutation in SGK1, or serum and glucocorticoid-inducible kinase 1, can lead to a shortening of the QT interval, which represents the repolarization time of the cardiac cells after a cardiac muscle contraction action potential. SGK1 does this by interacting with the KvLQT1 channel in cardiac cells, stimulating this channel when it is complex with KCNE1. SGK1 stimulates the slow delayed rectifier potassium current through this channel by phosphorylating PIKfyve, which then makes PI(3,5)P2, which goes on to increase the RAB11-dependent insertion of the KvLQT1/KCNE1 channels into the plasma membrane of cardiac neurons. SGK1 phosphorylates PIKfyve, which results in regulated channel activity through RAB11-dependent exocytosis of these KvLQT1/KCNE1-containing vesicles. Stress-induced stimuli have been known to activate SGK1, which demonstrates how long QT syndrome is brought on by stressors to the body or to the heart itself. By increasing the insertion of KVLQT1/KCNE1 channels into the plasma membrane through an alteration of trafficking within the cell, SGK1 is able to enhance the slow delayed potassium rectifier current in the neurons.

=== Role in neuronal disease ===
Two majors components of SGK1 expression, oxidative stress and an increase in glucocorticoids, are common components of the neurodegenerative process. "Studies suggest that SGK1 is an important player in cell death processes underlying neurodegerative diseases, and its role seems to be neuroprotective".

AMPA and kainate receptors are regulated by SGK isoforms. AMPA receptor activation is key for ischemic-induced cell death. Where changes in GluR2 levels are observed, "it has been suggested that disturbed SGK1-dependent regulation of AMPA and kainate receptors could participate in the pathophysiology of Amyotrophic lateral sclerosis (ALS), schizophrenia, and epilepsy". Kainate receptors are thought to be involved in epileptic activity.

Glutamate transporters act to remove glutamate from extracellular space. A lack of SGK1 may prevent glutamate activity while at the same time decreasing glutamate clearance from the synaptic cleft. "As glutamate may exert neurotoxic effects, altered function or regulation of glutamate transporters and glutamate receptors may foster neuroexcitotoxicity".

==== Huntingtin ====
Counteracting huntingtin toxicity, SGK1 has been found to phosphorylate huntingtin. "Genomic upregulation of SGK1 coincides with the onset of dopaminergic cell death in a model of Parkinson's disease". However, at the current time, it is unclear whether SGK1 prevents or motivates cell death. An excessive expression of SGK1 has also been observed in Rett syndrome (RTT), which is a disorder of severe intellectual disability.

SGK1 is suggested to take part in the signaling of brain-derived neurotrophic factor (BDNF). It is known that BDNF is involved in neuronal survival, plasticity, mood, and long-term memory. "SGK1 could participate in the signaling of BDNF during schizophrenia, depression, and Alzheimer's disease". "Moreover, BDNF concentrations are modified after major psychiatric treatment strategies", including antidepressants and electroconvulsive therapy.

==== Other neuronal diseases ====
- Tau protein: Tau protein is phosphorylated by SGK1. SGK1 may contribute to Alzheimer's disease, as it is paralleled by hyperphosphorylation of tau.
- CreaT: "The ability of SGK1 to upregulate the creatine transporter CreaT may similarly be of pathological significance, as individuals with defective CreaT have been shown to suffer from mental retardation".
- SKG1 mRNA: As SGK1 deficiency is simultaneously paired with insufficient glucocorticoid signaling, it has been suggested that it may participate in major depressive disorder. "A study looking at SGK1 mRNA expression in depressed patients found that depressed patients had significantly higher SGK1 mRNA levels".

== Interactions ==
SGK has been shown to interact with:

- KPNA2,
- MAPK7,
- NEDD4,
- PDPK1, and
- SLC9A3R2.
