= Familial atrial fibrillation =

- Familial atrial fibrillation has an autosomal dominant pattern of inheritance.
- Specialty: Medical genetics, cardiology
- Treatment: medications to slow heart rate, blood thinners, prevent afib, etc.
- Medication: blood thinners, cardiloc, tambucour, etc.

Familial atrial fibrillation is an autosomal dominant heart condition that causes atrial fibrillation. This condition is characterized by uncoordinated electrical activity in the heart's upper chambers (the atria), which causes the heartbeat to become fast and irregular.

== Cause ==
It is associated with multiple genes:

Type	OMIM	Gene	Locus
ATFB1	608583	?	10q22-q24
ATFB2	608988	?	6q
ATFB3	607554	KCNQ1	11
ATFB4	611493	KCNE2	21
ATFB5	611494	?	4q25
ATFB6	612201	NPPA	1p36-p35
ATFB7	612240	KCNA5	12p13
ATFB8	613055	?	16q22

Mutations in the KCNQ1 gene cause familial atrial fibrillation. The KCNE2 and KCNJ2 genes are associated with familial atrial fibrillation. A small percentage of all cases of familial atrial fibrillation are associated with changes in the KCNE2, KCNJ2, and KCNQ1 genes. These genes provide instructions for making proteins that act as channels across the cell membrane. These channels transport positively charged potassium ions into and out of cells. In heart muscle, the ion channels produced from the KCNE2, KCNJ2, and KCNQ1 genes play critical roles in maintaining the heart's normal rhythm. Mutations in these genes have been identified in only a few families worldwide. These mutations increase the activity of the channels, which changes the flow of potassium ions between cells. This disruption in ion transport alters the way the heart beats, increasing the risk of syncope, stroke, and sudden death.

Most cases of atrial fibrillation are not caused by mutations in a single gene. This condition is often related to structural abnormalities of the heart or underlying heart disease. Additional risk factors for atrial fibrillation include high blood pressure (hypertension), diabetes mellitus, a previous stroke, or an accumulation of fatty deposits and scar-like tissue in the lining of the arteries (atherosclerosis). Although most cases of atrial fibrillation are not known to run in families, studies suggest that they may arise partly from genetic risk factors. Researchers are working to determine which genetic changes may influence the risk of atrial fibrillation.

Familial atrial fibrillation appears to be inherited in an autosomal dominant pattern, which means the defective gene is located on an autosome, and only one copy of the defective gene - inherited from one parent - is sufficient to cause the disorder.

== Diagnosis ==
If untreated, this abnormal heart rhythm can lead to dizziness, chest pain, a sensation of fluttering or pounding in the chest (palpitations), shortness of breath, or fainting (syncope). Atrial fibrillation also increases the risk of stroke. Complications of familial atrial fibrillation can occur at any age, although some people with this heart condition never experience any health problems associated with the disorder. Atrial fibrillation is the most common type of sustained abnormal heart rhythm (arrhythmia), affecting more than 3 million people in the United States. The risk of developing this irregular heart rhythm increases with age. The incidence of the familial form of atrial fibrillation is unknown; however, recent studies suggest that up to 30 percent of all people with atrial fibrillation may have a history of the condition in their family.
