= KCNE5 =

Protein-coding gene in the species Homo sapiens

Identifiers
- Aliases: KCNE5, KCNE1L, potassium voltage-gated channel subfamily E regulatory subunit 5
- External IDs: OMIM: 300328; MGI: 1913490; GeneCards: KCNE5

Gene location (Human)
Chr.	X chromosome (human)
Band	Xq23	Start	109,623,700 bp
Band	Xq23	End	109,625,172 bp

Gene location (Mouse)
Chr.	X chromosome (mouse)
Band	X|X F2	Start	141,087,748 bp
Band	X|X F2	End	141,089,290 bp
RNA expression pattern
Bgee	Human / Mouse (ortholog); Top expressed in: gonad; substantia nigra; nucleus accumbens; hypothalamus; putamen; caudate nucleus; amygdala; hippocampus proper; right hemisphere of cerebellum; primary visual cortex / Top expressed in: ankle; ventricular zone; neural tube; embryo; internal carotid artery; tail of embryo; embryo; Gonadal ridge; medial ganglionic eminence; optic nerve; More reference expression data
BioGPS	n/a
Gene ontology
Molecular function	transmembrane transporter binding; voltage-gated potassium channel activity involved in cardiac muscle cell action potential repolarization; potassium channel regulator activity; protein binding; voltage-gated potassium channel activity; delayed rectifier potassium channel activity; voltage-gated potassium channel activity involved in ventricular cardiac muscle cell action potential repolarization
Cellular component	integral component of membrane; membrane; voltage-gated potassium channel complex; plasma membrane
Biological process	regulation of atrial cardiac muscle cell membrane repolarization; regulation of heart contraction; cardiac muscle contraction; ventricular cardiac muscle cell action potential; ion transport; regulation of cation channel activity; atrial cardiac muscle cell action potential; potassium ion transmembrane transport; positive regulation of potassium ion transmembrane transport; negative regulation of potassium ion transmembrane transport; regulation of membrane repolarization; regulation of heart rate by cardiac conduction; regulation of potassium ion transmembrane transport; regulation of ventricular cardiac muscle cell membrane repolarization; membrane repolarization during cardiac muscle cell action potential; membrane repolarization during action potential; membrane repolarization during ventricular cardiac muscle cell action potential; negative regulation of delayed rectifier potassium channel activity; potassium ion export across plasma membrane; negative regulation of potassium ion export across plasma membrane
Sources:Amigo / QuickGO
Orthologs
Databases	NCBI: entry; OMA: entry
Species	Human	Mouse
Entrez	23630	66240
Ensembl	ENSG00000176076	ENSMUSG00000090122
UniProt	Q9UJ90	Q9QZ26
RefSeq (mRNA)	NM_012282	NM_021487
RefSeq (protein)	NP_036414	NP_067462
Location (UCSC)	Chr X: 109.62 – 109.63 Mb	Chr X: 141.09 – 141.09 Mb
PubMed search
- Wikidata
View/Edit Human	View/Edit Mouse

KCNE1-like also known as KCNE1L is a protein that in humans is encoded by the KCNE1L gene.

== Function ==
Voltage-gated potassium (K_{v}) channels represent the most complex class of voltage-gated ion channels from both functional and structural standpoints. Their diverse functions include regulating neurotransmitter release, heart rate, insulin secretion, neuronal excitability, epithelial electrolyte transport, smooth muscle contraction, and cell volume. KCNE5 encodes a membrane protein, KCNE5 (originally named KCNE1-L) that has sequence similarity to the KCNE1 gene product, a member of the potassium channel, voltage-gated, isk-related subfamily.

The KCNE gene family comprises five genes in the human genome, each encoding a type I membrane protein. The KCNE subunits are potassium channel regulatory subunits that do not pass currents themselves but alter the properties of potassium channel pore-forming alpha subunits. KCNE5 is thus far the least-studied member of the KCNE family, but it is known to regulate a number of different K_{v} channel subtypes. KCNE5 co-assembles with KCNQ1, a K_{v} alpha subunit best known for its role in ventricular repolarization and in multiple epithelia. This co-assembly induces a +140 mV shift in voltage dependence of activation (when co-expressed in CHO cells) which would inhibit KCNQ1 activity across the normal physiological voltage range in most tissues.

KCNE5 also inhibits activity of channels formed with KCNQ1 and KCNE1. While reportedly not affecting KCNQ2, KCNQ2/3 or KCNQ5 channel activity, KCNE5 inhibits KCNQ4 in CHO cells but not in oocytes.

Although it has no known effects on hERG (K_{v}11.1) or K_{v}1.x family channel activity, KCNE5 inhibits K_{v}2.1 activity 50% and accelerates activation, slows deactivation and accelerates the recovery from closed state inactivation of channels formed by K_{v}2.1 and the 'silent' alpha subunit, K_{v}6.4.

KCNE5 was previously reported to not regulate K_{v}4.2 or K_{v}4.3, but has been found to accelerate, and left-shift the voltage dependence of, inactivation of K_{v}4.3-KChIP2 channel complexes.

== Structure ==
The KCNE family subunits are type I membrane proteins with an extracellular N-terminus and intracellular C-terminus. The transmembrane domain is alpha helical in KCNE1, 2 and 3 and predicted to also be helical in KCNE4 and KCNE5. The acknowledged role of members of the KCNE family is as K_{v} channel beta subunits, regulating the functional properties of K_{v} alpha subunits, with all three segments of the beta subunit contributing to binding, functional modulation and/or trafficking modulation to a greater or lesser degree. The high resolution structure of KCNE5 has not yet been determined, as of 2016. KCNE5 is an X-linked gene encoding a 143 residue protein in Homo sapiens.

== Tissue distribution ==
Human KCNE5 transcripts are most highly expressed in cardiac and skeletal muscle, spinal cord and brain, and it is also detectable in placenta. In mice, Kcne5 transcript was detected in embryonic cranial nerve migrating crest cells, ganglia, somites and myoepicaridal layer.

== Clinical significance ==
This intronless gene is deleted in AMME contiguous gene syndrome and is potentially involved in the cardiac and neurologic abnormalities found in the AMME contiguous gene syndrome.

KCNE5 is expressed in the human placenta and its expression increases in preeclampsia, although causality has not been established for this phenomenon.

Inherited sequence variants in human KCNE5 are associated with atrial fibrillation and Brugada syndrome. Atrial fibrillation is the most common chronic cardiac arrhythmia, affecting 2-3 million in the United States alone, predominantly in the aging population. A minority of cases are linked to ion channel gene mutations, whereas the majority are associated with structural heart defects. Brugada syndrome is a relatively rare but lethal ventricular arrhythmia most commonly linked to voltage-gated sodium channel gene SCN5A mutations, but also associated with some K_{v} channel gene sequence variants.

KCNE5 mutation L65F is associated with atrial fibrillation and upregulates KCNQ1-KCNE1 currents when co-expressed with these subunits. In contrast, a polymorphism in KCNE5 encoding a P33S substitution was found to be less common in atrial fibrillation patients than in control subjects, although these findings were at odds with those of other studies.

KCNE5-Y81H was detected in a man with a type 1 Brugada pattern body-surface electrocardiogram, while KCNE5-D92E:E93X was detected in another case of Brugada and associated with premature sudden death in other male family members, but not females - significant because KCNE5 is an X-linked gene. These two gene variants did not affect KCNQ1-KCNE1 currents when co-expressed in CHO cells, but produced larger currents than wild-type KCNE5 when coexpressed with K_{v}4.3-KChIP2, giving a possible mechanism for Brugada syndrome, i.e., increased ventricular Ito density.

A KCNE5 non-coding region gene variant, the G variant of the rs697829 A/G polymorphism, has also been reported to associate with prolonged QT interval and higher hazard ratio for death, compared to the G variant.
