= SGK2 =

Protein-coding gene in the species Homo sapiens

Identifiers
- Aliases: SGK2, H-dJ138B7.2, serine/threonine kinase 2, serum/glucocorticoid regulated kinase 2
- External IDs: OMIM: 607589; MGI: 1351318; GeneCards: SGK2
Enzyme activity
EC #	BRENDA	ExPASy	KEGG	MetaCyc
2.7.11.1	↗	↗	↗	↗

Gene location (Human)
Chr.	Chromosome 20 (human)
Band	20q13.12	Start	43,558,968 bp
Band	20q13.12	End	43,588,237 bp

Gene location (Mouse)
Chr.	Chromosome 2 (mouse)
Band	2|2 H2	Start	162,829,250 bp
Band	2|2 H2	End	162,856,047 bp
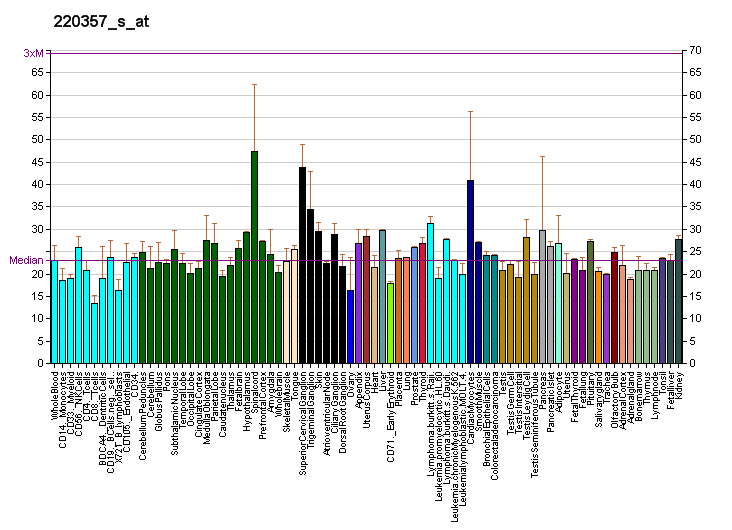
RNA expression pattern
Bgee	Human / Mouse (ortholog); Top expressed in: mucosa of transverse colon; right lobe of liver; rectum; human kidney; C1 segment; renal medulla; duodenum; body of pancreas; kidney tubule; mucosa of ileum / Top expressed in: right kidney; human kidney; left lobe of liver; proximal tubule; pyloric antrum; mucous cell of stomach; epithelium of stomach; large intestine; ileum; intestinal villus; More reference expression data
BioGPS	More reference expression data
Gene ontology
Molecular function	ATP binding; calcium channel regulator activity; sodium channel regulator activity; protein kinase activity; potassium channel regulator activity; kinase activity; chloride channel regulator activity; nucleotide binding; transferase activity; protein serine/threonine kinase activity
Cellular component	nucleus; intracellular anatomical structure; cytosol; cytoplasm; nucleoplasm; cellular component
Biological process	response to oxidative stress; positive regulation of transporter activity; regulation of cell population proliferation; ion transmembrane transport; protein phosphorylation; intracellular signal transduction; peptidyl-serine phosphorylation; regulation of apoptotic process; phosphorylation; regulation of cell growth
Sources:Amigo / QuickGO
Orthologs
Databases	NCBI: entry; OMA: entry
Species	Human	Mouse
Entrez	10110	27219
Ensembl	ENSG00000101049	ENSMUSG00000017868
UniProt	Q9HBY8; Q5H8Y5	Q9QZS5
RefSeq (mRNA)	NM_170693; NM_001199264; NM_016276	NM_001291152; NM_001291154; NM_013731
RefSeq (protein)	NP_001186193; NP_057360; NP_733794	NP_001278081; NP_001278083; NP_038759
Location (UCSC)	Chr 20: 43.56 – 43.59 Mb	Chr 2: 162.83 – 162.86 Mb
PubMed search
- Wikidata
View/Edit Human	View/Edit Mouse

Serine/threonine-protein kinase Sgk2 is an enzyme that in humans is encoded by the SGK2 gene.

This gene encodes a serine/threonine protein kinase. Although this gene product is similar to serum- and glucocorticoid-induced protein kinase (SGK), this gene is not induced by serum or glucocorticoids. This gene is induced in response to signals that activate phosphatidylinositol 3-kinase (PI3K), which is also true for SGK. Two alternate transcripts encoding two different isoforms have been described.

== Ligands ==
Privosegtor, an activator of the SGK2 enzyme, is being developed for the treatment of optic neuritis.
