= PODXL =

Protein-coding gene in the species Homo sapiens

Identifiers
- Aliases: PODXL, Gp200, PC, PCLP, PCLP-1, podocalyxin like, PODXL1, PDX, gp135
- External IDs: OMIM: 602632; GeneCards: PODXL

Gene location (Human)
Chr.	Chromosome 7 (human)
Band	7q32.3	Start	131,500,262 bp
Band	7q32.3	End	131,558,217 bp
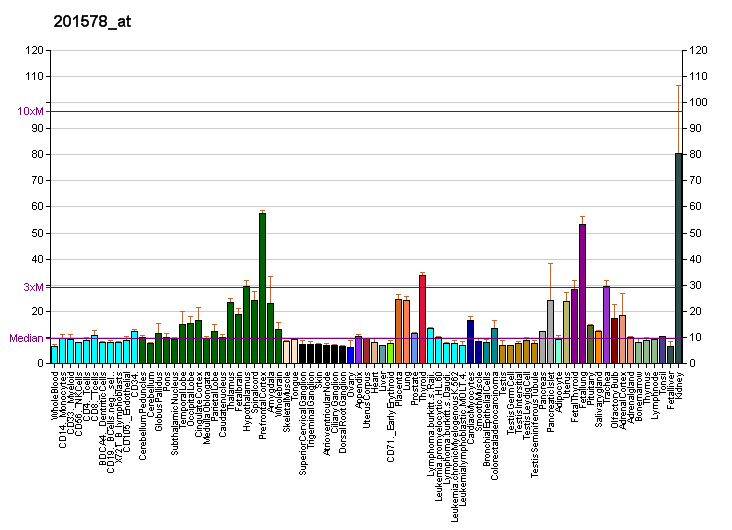
RNA expression pattern
Bgee	Human / Mouse (ortholog); Top expressed in: glomerulus; metanephric glomerulus; germinal epithelium; parietal pleura; right lung; visceral pleura; renal medulla; lower lobe of lung; seminal vesicula; human kidney / n/a; More reference expression data
BioGPS	More reference expression data
Gene ontology
Molecular function	protein binding
Cellular component	cytoplasm; cell body; integral component of membrane; cell projection; intracellular membrane-bounded organelle; membrane; filopodium; ruffle; plasma membrane; integral component of plasma membrane; microvillus; slit diaphragm; apical plasma membrane; membrane raft; extracellular exosome; microvillus membrane; lamellipodium; extracellular space; nucleolus; microtubule organizing center
Biological process	regulation of microvillus assembly; negative regulation of cell adhesion; positive regulation of cell-cell adhesion mediated by integrin; glomerular visceral epithelial cell development; negative regulation of cell-cell adhesion; positive regulation of cell migration; cell adhesion; regulation of cell-cell adhesion; cell migration; leukocyte migration; epithelial tube formation
Sources:Amigo / QuickGO
Orthologs
Databases	NCBI: entry; OMA: entry
Species	Human	Mouse
Entrez	5420	n/a
Ensembl	ENSG00000128567	n/a
UniProt	O00592	n/a
RefSeq (mRNA)	NM_005397; NM_001018111	n/a
RefSeq (protein)	NP_001018121; NP_005388	n/a
Location (UCSC)	Chr 7: 131.5 – 131.56 Mb	n/a
PubMed search		n/a
- Wikidata
View/Edit Human

Podocalyxin-like protein 1 is a protein that in humans is encoded by the PODXL gene.

== Function ==
This gene encodes a member of the CD34 sialomucin protein family. The encoded protein was originally identified as an important component of glomerular podocytes. Inactivation of the encoding gene in mice leads to anuria, omphalocele and perinatal death. Podocytes are highly differentiated epithelial cells with interdigitating foot processes covering the outer aspect of the glomerular basement membrane. Other biological activities of the encoded protein include: binding in a membrane protein complex with Na+/H+ exchanger regulatory factor to intracellular cytoskeletal elements, playing a role in hematopoietic cell differentiation, and being expressed in vascular endothelium cells and binding to L-selectin.

== Expression ==
The expression and localisation of PODXL in human cells, tissues and organs have been investigated by the Human Protein Atlas consortium. According to antibody-based profiling, the protein is present in glomerular podocytes, endothelial cells, glandular cells in fallopian tube, uterus and seminal vesicle and according to RNA expression analysis, the PODXL transcripts are present in all analysed human tissues. Based on confocal microscopy, the protein is mainly localised to the plasma membrane and microtubule organizing center and in addition localized to vesicles.

== Interactions ==
PODXL has been shown to interact with Sodium-hydrogen exchange regulatory cofactor 2.

== Clinical significance ==
Podocalyxin is upregulated in a number of cancers and is frequently associated with poor prognosis. Based on patient survival data, high level of PODXL transcripts in tumor cells is associated with poor prognosis in renal cancer.

== Epitopes ==
PODXL can be post-translationally modified to add epitopes. Notable ones include TRA-1-60, TRA-1-81, GCTM2, GP200, and mAb84.
