= Privosegtor =

Clinical data
- Other names: ACT-01; BN-201; G-79; OCS 05

Legal status
- Legal status: investigational

Identifiers
- IUPAC name: N-[2-[(2-Amino-2-oxoethyl)-[3-(2-oxopyrrolidin-1-yl)propyl]amino]-2-oxoethyl]-2-[2-(2-fluorophenyl)ethylamino]-N-(2-methylpropyl)acetamide
- CAS Number: 1361200-34-1
- PubChem CID: 66610682
- IUPHAR/BPS: 13222
- DrugBank: DB18295
- ChemSpider: 64853740
- UNII: KCN37L7EIH
- ChEBI: CHEBI:759947
- ChEMBL: ChEMBL6068029

Chemical and physical data
- Formula: C_{25}H_{38}FN_{5}O_{4}
- Molar mass: 491.608 g·mol^{−1}
- 3D model (JSmol): Interactive image
- SMILES: CC(C)CN(CC(=O)N(CCCN1CCCC1=O)CC(=O)N)C(=O)CNCCC2=CC=CC=C2F
- InChI: InChI=1S/C25H38FN5O4/c1-19(2)16-31(24(34)15-28-11-10-20-7-3-4-8-21(20)26)18-25(35)30(17-22(27)32)14-6-13-29-12-5-9-23(29)33/h3-4,7-8,19,28H,5-6,9-18H2,1-2H3,(H2,27,32); Key:ODCKWAPNRBCXHV-UHFFFAOYSA-N

Privosegtor is an investigational new drug that is being evaluated by Oculis Pharma for the treatment of optic neuritis. It is a serine/threonine-protein kinase SGK2 activator that is claimed to have neuroprotective properties.

== Clinical trials ==
Privosegtor is currently in phase 3 clinical trials for optic neuritis.
