= Sodium-hydrogen exchange regulatory cofactor 2 =

Protein-coding gene in humans

NHERF2
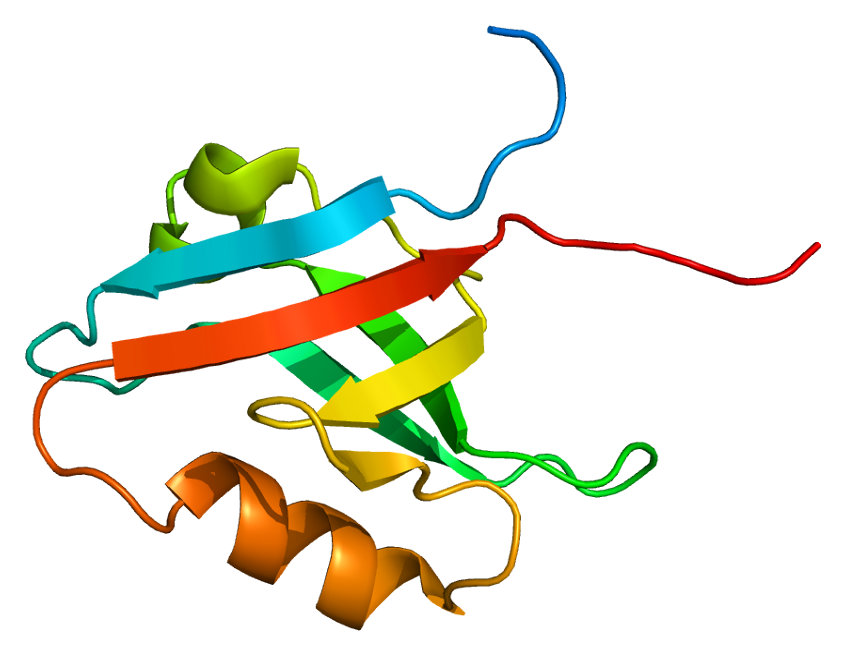

Identifiers
- Aliases: NHERF2, E3KARP, NHE3RF2, NHERF-2, OCTS2, SIP-1, SIP1, TKA-1, Sodium-hydrogen exchange regulatory cofactor 2, SLC9A3 regulator 2, SLC9A3R2
- External IDs: OMIM: 606553; MGI: 1890662; GeneCards: NHERF2
Available structures
PDB	Ortholog search: PDBe RCSB
PDB	List of PDB id codes 2D11, 2HE4, 2OCS, 4P0C

Gene location (Human)
Chr.	Chromosome 16 (human)
Band	16p13.3	Start	2,025,356 bp
Band	16p13.3	End	2,039,026 bp

Gene location (Mouse)
Chr.	Chromosome 17 (mouse)
Band	17|17 A3.3	Start	24,858,260 bp
Band	17|17 A3.3	End	24,869,301 bp
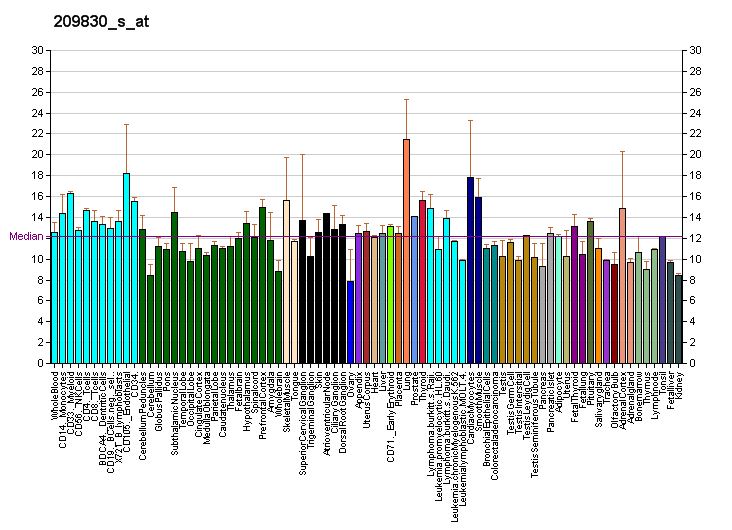
RNA expression pattern
Bgee	Human / Mouse (ortholog); Top expressed in: apex of heart; right lung; right lobe of liver; upper lobe of left lung; right lobe of thyroid gland; right auricle of heart; right coronary artery; left lobe of thyroid gland; left uterine tube; left coronary artery / Top expressed in: external carotid artery; aortic valve; motor neuron; internal carotid artery; ascending aorta; right lung; right lung lobe; carotid body; left lung; right ventricle; More reference expression data
BioGPS	More reference expression data
Gene ontology
Molecular function	molecular adaptor activity; phosphatase binding; beta-catenin binding; signaling receptor binding; protein C-terminus binding; protein binding; cadherin binding
Cellular component	plasma membrane; extracellular exosome; apical plasma membrane; membrane; endomembrane system; nucleus; focal adhesion
Biological process	protein-containing complex assembly
Sources:Amigo / QuickGO
Orthologs
Databases	NCBI: entry; OMA: entry
Species	Human	Mouse
Entrez	9351	65962
Ensembl	ENSG00000065054	ENSMUSG00000002504
UniProt	Q15599	Q9JHL1
RefSeq (mRNA)	NM_001130012; NM_001252073; NM_001252075; NM_001252076; NM_004785	NM_023055; NM_023449; NM_001357796
RefSeq (protein)	NP_001123484; NP_001239002; NP_001239004; NP_001239005; NP_004776	NP_075542; NP_075938; NP_001344725
Location (UCSC)	Chr 16: 2.03 – 2.04 Mb	Chr 17: 24.86 – 24.87 Mb
PubMed search
- Wikidata
View/Edit Human	View/Edit Mouse

Sodium-hydrogen exchange regulatory cofactor NHE-RF2 (NHERF-2) also known as tyrosine kinase activator protein 1 (TKA-1) or SRY-interacting protein 1 (SIP-1) is a protein that in humans is encoded by the NHERF2 gene (previously SLC9A3R2).

NHERF-2 is a scaffold protein that connects plasma membrane proteins with members of the ezrin/moesin/radixin family and thereby helps to link them to the actin cytoskeleton and to regulate their surface expression. It is necessary for cAMP-mediated phosphorylation and inhibition of SLC9A3. In addition, it may also act as scaffold protein in the nucleus.

== Function ==
This regulatory protein (factor) interacts with a sodium/hydrogen exchanger NHE3 (SLC9A3) in the brush border membrane of the proximal tubule, small intestine, and colon that plays a major role in transepithelial sodium absorption. SLC9A3R2, as well as SLC9A3R1 and protein kinase A phosphorylation, may play a role in NHE3 regulation.

== Interactions ==
Sodium-hydrogen exchange regulatory cofactor 2 has been shown to interact with SGK, Actinin alpha 4, Parathyroid hormone receptor 1, Phosphoinositide-dependent kinase-1, EZR, PODXL, Cystic fibrosis transmembrane conductance regulator and PLCB3.

== See also ==
- Solute carrier family
