= KCNE3 =

Protein-coding gene in humans

Identifiers
- Aliases: KCNE3, HOKPP, HYPP, MiRP2, potassium voltage-gated channel subfamily E regulatory subunit 3, BRGDA6
- External IDs: OMIM: 604433; MGI: 1891124; HomoloGene: 3994; GeneCards: KCNE3; OMA:KCNE3 - orthologs

Gene location (Human)
Chr.	Chromosome 11 (human)
Band	11q13.4	Start	74,454,841 bp
Band	11q13.4	End	74,467,729 bp

Gene location (Mouse)
Chr.	Chromosome 7 (mouse)
Band	7|7 E2	Start	99,825,709 bp
Band	7|7 E2	End	99,834,076 bp
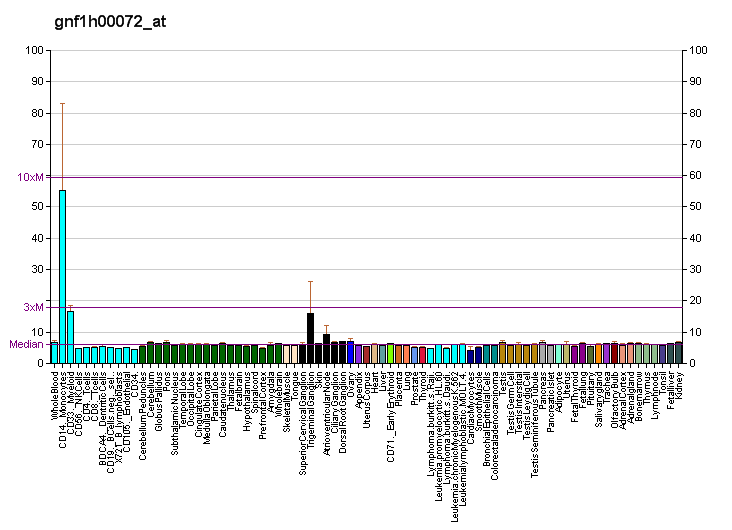
RNA expression pattern
Bgee	Human / Mouse (ortholog); Top expressed in: nasal epithelium; monocyte; mucosa of ileum; duodenum; bronchial epithelial cell; mucosa of sigmoid colon; pancreatic ductal cell; pylorus; rectum; blood / Top expressed in: spermatid; left colon; crypt of lieberkuhn of small intestine; spermatocyte; seminiferous tubule; duodenum; Paneth cell; migratory enteric neural crest cell; jejunum; ileum; More reference expression data
BioGPS	More reference expression data
Gene ontology
Molecular function	potassium channel activity; transmembrane transporter binding; voltage-gated ion channel activity; potassium channel regulator activity; protein binding; voltage-gated potassium channel activity; delayed rectifier potassium channel activity; voltage-gated potassium channel activity involved in ventricular cardiac muscle cell action potential repolarization
Cellular component	cytoplasm; integral component of membrane; vesicle; perikaryon; cell projection; membrane; voltage-gated potassium channel complex; plasma membrane; neuronal cell body membrane; dendrite; membrane raft
Biological process	regulation of potassium ion transport; positive regulation of voltage-gated calcium channel activity; regulation of ion transmembrane transport; ion transport; potassium ion transport; potassium ion transmembrane transport; negative regulation of delayed rectifier potassium channel activity; regulation of heart rate by cardiac conduction; negative regulation of potassium ion export across plasma membrane; negative regulation of voltage-gated potassium channel activity; negative regulation of membrane repolarization during ventricular cardiac muscle cell action potential; regulation of ventricular cardiac muscle cell membrane repolarization; ventricular cardiac muscle cell action potential; membrane repolarization during action potential; membrane repolarization during ventricular cardiac muscle cell action potential; potassium ion export across plasma membrane
Sources:Amigo / QuickGO
Orthologs
Species	Human	Mouse
Entrez	10008	57442
Ensembl	ENSG00000175538	ENSMUSG00000035165
UniProt	Q9Y6H6	Q9WTW2
RefSeq (mRNA)	NM_005472	NM_001190869; NM_001190870; NM_001190871; NM_001190950; NM_020574 NM_001360466; NM_001360467
RefSeq (protein)	NP_005463	NP_001177798; NP_001177799; NP_001177800; NP_001177879; NP_065599 NP_001347395; NP_001347396
Location (UCSC)	Chr 11: 74.45 – 74.47 Mb	Chr 7: 99.83 – 99.83 Mb
PubMed search
- Wikidata
View/Edit Human	View/Edit Mouse

Potassium voltage-gated channel, Isk-related family, member 3 (KCNE3), also known as MinK-related peptide 2 (MiRP2) is a protein that in humans is encoded by the KCNE3 gene.

== Function ==
Voltage-gated potassium channels (K_{v}) represent the most complex class of voltage-gated ion channels from both functional and structural standpoints. Their diverse functions include regulating neurotransmitter release, heart rate, insulin secretion, neuronal excitability, epithelial electrolyte transport, smooth muscle contraction, and cell volume. KCNE3 encodes a member of the five-member KCNE family of voltage-gated potassium (K_{v}) channel ancillary or β subunits.

KCNE3 is best known for modulating the KCNQ1 K_{v} α subunit, but it also regulates hERG, K_{v}2.1, K_{v}3.x, K_{v}4.x and K_{v}12.2 in heterologous co-expression experiments and/or in vivo.

Co-assembly with KCNE3 converts KCNQ1 from a voltage-dependent delayed rectifier K+ channel to a constitutively open K+ channel with an almost linear current/voltage (I/V) relationship. KCNQ1-KCNE3 channels have been detected in the basolateral membrane of mouse small intestinal crypts, where they provide a driving force to regulate Cl- secretion. Specific amino acids within the transmembrane segment (V72) and extracellular domain (D54 and D55) of KCNE3 are important for its control of KCNQ1 voltage dependence. D54 and D55 interact electrostatically with R237 in the S4 segment of the KCNQ1 voltage sensor, helping to stabilize S4 in the activated state, which in turn locks open the channel unless the cell is held at a strongly hyperpolarizing (negative) membrane potential. The ability of KCNQ1-KCNE3 channels to remain open at weakly negative membrane potentials permits their activity in non-excitable, polarized epithelial cells such as those in the intestine.

KCNE3 also interacts with hERG, and when co-expressed in Xenopus laevis oocytes KCNE3 inhibits hERG activity by an unknown mechanism. It is not known whether hERG-KCNE3 complexes occur in vivo.

KCNE3 interacts with Kv2.1 in vitro and forms complexes with it in rat heart and brain. KCNE3 slows Kv2.1 activation and deactivation. KCNE3 can also regulate channels of the Kv3 subfamily, which are best known for permitting ultrarapid firing of neurons because of the extremely fast gating (activation and deactivation). KCNE3 moderately slows Kv3.1 and Kv3.2 activation and deactivation, and moderately speeds their C-type inactivation. It is possible that KCNE3 (and KCNE1 and 2) regulation of Kv3.1 and Kv3.2 helps to increase functional diversity within the Kv3 subfamily. KCNE3 also regulates Kv3.4, augments its current by increasing the unitary conductance and by left-shifting the voltage dependence such that the channel can open at more negative voltages. This may allow Kv3.4-KCNE3 channels to contribute to setting resting membrane potential.

KCNE3 inhibits the fast inactivating K_{v} channel K_{v}4.3, which generates the transient outward Kv current (Ito) in human cardiac myocytes. similarly, KCNE3 was recently found to inhibit Kv4.2, and it is thought that this regulation modulates spike frequency and other electrical properties of auditory neurons.

Kv12.2 channels were found to be inhibited by endogenous KCNE3 (and KCNE1) subunits in Xenopus laevis oocytes. Thus, silencing of endogenous KCNE3 or KCNE1 using siRNA increases the macroscopic current of exogenously expressed Kv12.2. Kv12.2 forms a tripartite complex with KCNE1 and KCNE3 in oocytes, and may do so in mouse brain. Previously, endogenous oocyte KCNE3 and KCNE1 were also found to inhibit exogenous hERG activity and slow the gating of exogenous Kv2.1.

== Structure ==
KCNE proteins are type I membrane proteins, and each assembles with one or more types of K_{v} channel α subunit to modulate their gating kinetics and other functional parameters. KCNE3 has a larger predicted extracellular domain, and smaller predicted intracellular domain, in terms of primary structure, when compared to other KCNE proteins. As with other KCNE proteins, the transmembrane segment of KCNE3 is thought to be α-helical, and the extracellular domain also adopts a partly helical structure. KCNE3, like KCNE1 and possibly other KCNE proteins, are thought to make contact with the S4 of one α subunit and the S6 of another α subunit within the tetramer of Kv α subunits in a complex. No studies have as yet reported the number of KCNE3 subunits within a functional channel complex; it is likely to be either 2 or 4.

== Tissue distribution ==
KCNE3 is most prominently expressed in the colon, small intestine, and specific cell types in the stomach. It is also detectable in the kidney and trachea, and depending on the species is also reportedly expressed at lower levels in the brain, heart and skeletal muscle. Specifically, KCNE3 was detected in rat, horse and human heart, but not in mouse heart. Some have observed KCNE3 expression in rat brain, rat and human skeletal muscle, and the mouse C2C12 skeletal muscle cell line, others have not detected it in these tissues in the mouse.

== Clinical significance ==
Genetic disruption of the Kcne3 gene in mice impairs intestinal cyclic AMP-stimulated chloride secretion via disruption of intestinal KCNQ1-KCNE3 channels that are important for regulating the chloride current. KCNE3 also performs a similar function in mouse tracheal epithelium. Kcne3 deletion in mice also predisposes to ventricular arrhythmogenesis, but KCNE3 expression is not detectable in mouse heart. The mechanism for ventricular arrhythmogenesis was demonstrated to be indirect, and associated with autoimmune attack of the adrenal gland and secondary hyperaldosteronism (KCNE3 is not detectable in the adrenal gland). The elevated serum aldosterone predisposes to arrhythmias triggered in a coronary artery ligation ischemia/reperfusion injury model. Blockade of the aldosterone receptor with spironolactone removed the ventricular arrhythmia predisposition in Kcne3-/- mice. Kcne3 deletion also impairs auditory function because of the loss of regulation of Kv4.2 channels by KCNE3 in spiral ganglion neurons (SGNs) of the auditory system. KCNE3 is thought to regulate SGN firing properties and membrane potential via its modulation of Kv4.2. While one group reported not observing skeletal muscle abnormalities in Kcne3 null mice, a more comprehensive study showed clear skeletal muscle abnormalities as a result of germline Kcne3 deletion, including abnormal hindlimb clasping, altered contractile response to repetitive stimulation, and transcriptome remodeling.

Mutations in human KCNE3 have been associated with hypokalemic periodic paralysis and Brugada syndrome.

The association with the R83H mutation in KCNE3 is controversial and other groups have detected the same mutation in individuals not exhibiting symptoms of periodic paralysis. The mutation may instead be a benign polymorphism, or else it requires another genetic or environmental 'hit' before it becomes pathogenic, although the importance of KCNE3 in skeletal muscle function is supported by transgenic mouse studies. Kv channels formed by Kv3.4 and R83H-KCNE3 have impaired function compared to wild-type channels, are less able to open at negative potentials and are sensitive to proton block during acidosis.

KCNE3-linked Brugada syndrome is thought to arise because of mutant KCNE3 being unable to inhibit Kv4.3 channels in ventricular myocytes as it is suggested to do in healthy individuals. It appears that, unlike in mice, KCNE3 expression is detectable in human heart. It has not been reported whether people with KCNE3 mutations also have adrenal gland-related symptoms such as hyperaldosteronism.

KCNE3 mutations have been suggested to associate with Ménière's disease in Japanese, a condition that presents as tinnitus, spontaneous vertigo, and periodic hearing loss, however this association is also controversial and was not observed in a Caucasian population. In a study of tinnitus utilizing deep resequencing analysis, the authors were not able to prove or disprove association of KCNE3 sequence variation with tinnitus.

== See also ==
- Voltage-gated potassium channel
- KCNE1
- KCNE2
- KCNQ1
