= KCNQ1 =

Protein-coding gene in the species Homo sapiens

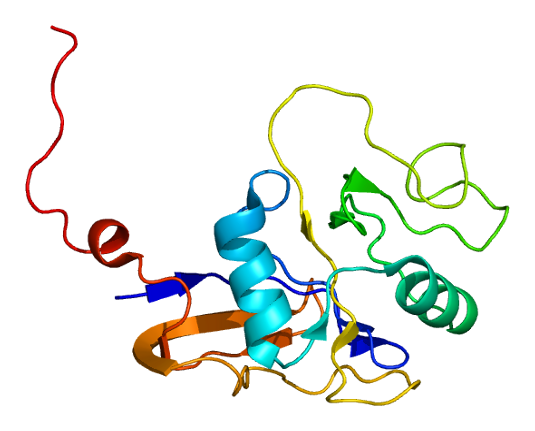

Identifiers
- Aliases: KCNQ1, ATFB1, ATFB3, JLNS1, KCNA8, KCNA9, KVLQT1, Kv1.9, Kv7.1, LQT, LQT1, RWS, SQT2, WRS, potassium voltage-gated channel subfamily Q member 1
- External IDs: OMIM: 607542; MGI: 108083; GeneCards: KCNQ1
Available structures
PDB	Ortholog search: PDBe RCSB
PDB	List of PDB id codes 3BJ4, 3HFC, 3HFE, 4UMO, 4V0C

Gene location (Human)
Chr.	Chromosome 11 (human)
Band	11p15.5-p15.4	Start	2,444,684 bp
Band	11p15.5-p15.4	End	2,849,105 bp

Gene location (Mouse)
Chr.	Chromosome 7 (mouse)
Band	7 F5|7 88.12 cM	Start	142,660,099 bp
Band	7 F5|7 88.12 cM	End	142,980,779 bp
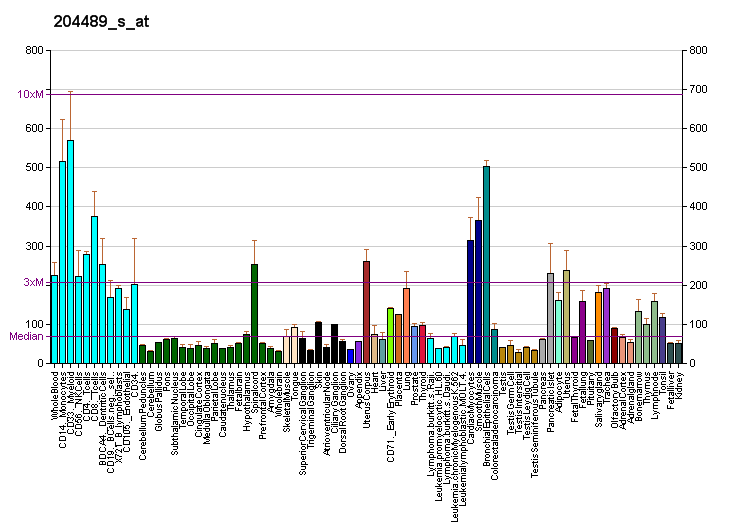

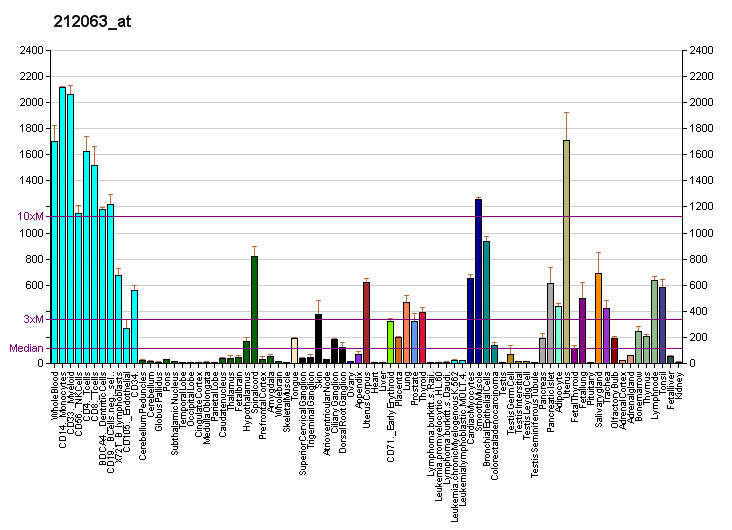

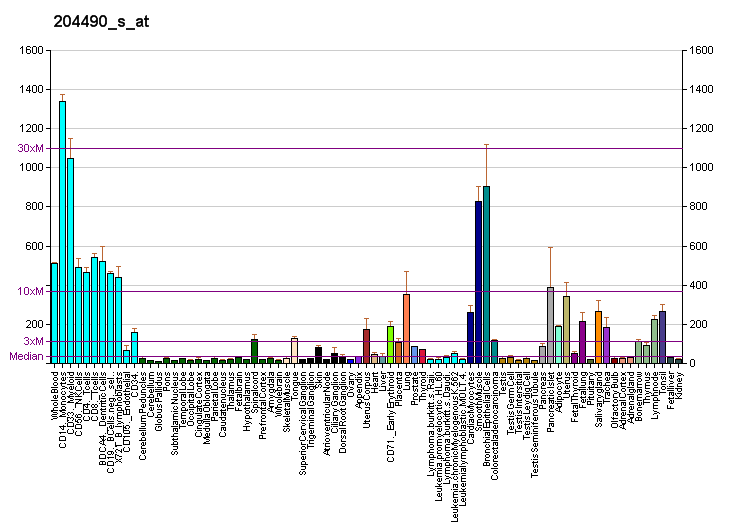
RNA expression pattern
Bgee	Human / Mouse (ortholog); Top expressed in: left adrenal cortex; right adrenal cortex; body of pancreas; duodenum; left lobe of thyroid gland; right lobe of thyroid gland; body of stomach; apex of heart; monocyte; left ventricle / Top expressed in: epithelium of stomach; stria vascularis; crypt of lieberkuhn of small intestine; pyloric antrum; myocardium of atrium; Paneth cell; right ventricle; mucous cell of stomach; secondary oocyte; myocardium of ventricle; More reference expression data
BioGPS	More reference expression data
Gene ontology
Molecular function	voltage-gated potassium channel activity involved in atrial cardiac muscle cell action potential repolarization; scaffold protein binding; protein kinase A regulatory subunit binding; calmodulin binding; ion channel activity; voltage-gated potassium channel activity; transmembrane transporter binding; outward rectifier potassium channel activity; delayed rectifier potassium channel activity; potassium channel activity; protein binding; phosphatidylinositol-4,5-bisphosphate binding; protein kinase A catalytic subunit binding; voltage-gated potassium channel activity involved in cardiac muscle cell action potential repolarization; protein phosphatase 1 binding; voltage-gated potassium channel activity involved in ventricular cardiac muscle cell action potential repolarization; voltage-gated ion channel activity
Cellular component	integral component of membrane; cytoplasmic vesicle; endosome; cytoplasmic vesicle membrane; voltage-gated potassium channel complex; membrane; lysosome; endoplasmic reticulum; membrane raft; basolateral plasma membrane; plasma membrane; ion channel complex; cytoplasm; late endosome; early endosome
Biological process	regulation of ventricular cardiac muscle cell membrane repolarization; negative regulation of delayed rectifier potassium channel activity; intestinal absorption; regulation of atrial cardiac muscle cell membrane repolarization; positive regulation of cardiac muscle contraction; cellular response to epinephrine stimulus; positive regulation of potassium ion transmembrane transport; renal absorption; negative regulation of voltage-gated potassium channel activity; inner ear development; cardiac muscle contraction; regulation of gene expression by genetic imprinting; hearing; atrial cardiac muscle cell action potential; regulation of heart rate by cardiac conduction; cellular response to cAMP; regulation of gastric acid secretion; transmembrane transport; ventricular cardiac muscle cell action potential; regulation of ion transmembrane transport; regulation of membrane repolarization; ion transport; potassium ion export across plasma membrane; positive regulation of heart rate; potassium ion transmembrane transport; membrane repolarization during cardiac muscle cell action potential; potassium ion transport; regulation of heart contraction; membrane repolarization; membrane repolarization during action potential; membrane repolarization during ventricular cardiac muscle cell action potential; membrane repolarization during atrial cardiac muscle cell action potential; cardiac conduction
Sources:Amigo / QuickGO
Orthologs
Databases	NCBI: entry; OMA: entry
Species	Human	Mouse
Entrez	3784	16535
Ensembl	ENSG00000282076; ENSG00000053918	ENSMUSG00000009545
UniProt	P51787	P97414
RefSeq (mRNA)	NM_181798; NM_000218; NM_181797	NM_008434
RefSeq (protein)	NP_000209; NP_861463	NP_032460
Location (UCSC)	Chr 11: 2.44 – 2.85 Mb	Chr 7: 142.66 – 142.98 Mb
PubMed search
- Wikidata
View/Edit Human	View/Edit Mouse

Potassium voltage-gated channel subfamily KQT member 1 is a potassium channel protein encoded in the human by the KCNQ1 gene. Its mutation causes long QT syndrome, K_{v}7.1 is a voltage and lipid-gated potassium channel present in the cell membranes of cardiac tissue and in inner ear neurons among other tissues. In the cardiac cells, K_{v}7.1 mediates the I_{Ks} (or slow delayed rectifying K^{+}) current that contributes to the repolarization of the cell, terminating the cardiac action potential and thereby the heart's contraction. It is a member of the KCNQ family of potassium channels.

== Structure ==
KvLQT1 is made of six membrane-spanning domains S1-S6, two intracellular domains, and a pore loop. The KvLQT1 channel is made of four KCNQ1 subunits, which form the actual ion channel.

== Function ==
This gene encodes a protein for a voltage-gated potassium channel required for the repolarization phase of the cardiac action potential. The gene product can form heteromultimers with two other potassium channel proteins, KCNE1 and KCNE3. The gene is located in a region of chromosome 11 that contains a large number of contiguous genes that are abnormally imprinted in cancer and the Beckwith-Wiedemann syndrome. Two alternative transcripts encoding distinct isoforms have been described.

== Clinical significance ==
Mutations in the gene can lead to a defective protein and several forms of inherited arrhythmias as Long QT syndrome which is a prolongation of the QT interval of heart repolarization, Short QT syndrome, and Familial Atrial Fibrillation. KvLQT1 are also expressed in the pancreas, and KvLQT1 Long QT syndrome patients has been shown to have hyperinsulinemic hypoglycaemia following an oral glucose load. Currents arising from K_{v}7.1 in over-expression systems have never been recapitulated in native tissues - K_{v}7.1 is always found in native tissues with a modulatory subunit. In cardiac tissue, these subunits comprise KCNE1 and yotiao. Though physiologically irrelevant, homotetrameric K_{v}7.1 channels also display a unique form of C-type inactivation that reaches equilibrium quickly, allowing KvLQT1 currents to plateau. This is different from the inactivation seen in A-type currents, which causes rapid current decay.

== Ligands ==
- ML277: potent and selective channel activator
- (R)-L3 (L‐364,373): potent channel activator

== Interactions ==
KvLQT1 has been shown to interact with PRKACA, PPP1CA and AKAP9.

KvLQT1 can also associate with any of the five members of the KCNE family of proteins, but interactions with KCNE1, KCNE2, KCNE3 are the only interactions within this protein family that affect the human heart. KCNE2, KCNE4, and KCNE5 have been shown to have an inhibitory effect on the functionality of KvLQT1, while KCNE1 and KCNE3 are activators of KvLQT1. KvLQT1 can associate with KCNE1 and KCNE4 with the activation effects of KCNE1 overriding the inhibitory effects of KCNE4 on the KvLQT1 channel, and KvLQT1 will commonly associate with anywhere from two to four different KCNE proteins in order to be functional. However, KvLQT1 most commonly associates with KCNE1 and forms the KvLQT1/KCNE1 complex since it has only been seen to function in vivo when associated with another protein. KCNQ1 will form a heteromer with KCNE1 in order to slow its activation and enhance the current density at the plasma membrane of the neuron. In addition to associating with KCNE proteins, the N-terminal juxtamembranous domain of KvLQT1 can also associate with SGK1, which stimulates the slow delayed potassium rectifier current. Since SGK1 requires structural integrity to stimulate KvLQT1/KCNE1, any mutations present in the KvLQT1 protein can result in reduced stimulation of this channel by SGK1. General mutations in KvLQT1 have been known to cause a decrease in this slow delayed potassium rectifier current, longer cardiac action potentials, and a tendency to have tachyarrhythmias.

== KvLQT1/KCNE1 ==
KCNE1 (minK), can assemble with KvLQT1 to form a slow delayed potassium rectifier channel. KCNE1 slows the inactivation of KvLQT1 when the two proteins form a heteromeric complex, and the current amplitude is greatly increased compared to WT-KvLQT1 homotetrameric channels. KCNE1 associates with the pore region of KvLQT1, and its transmembrane domain contributes to the selectivity filter of this heteromeric channel complex. The alpha helix of the KCNE1 protein interacts with the pore domain S5/S6 and with the S4 domain of the KvLQT1 channel. This results in structural modifications of the voltage sensor and the selectivity filter of the KvLQT1 channel. Mutations in either the alpha subunit of this complex, KvLQT1 or the beta subunit, KCNE1, can lead to Long QT Syndrome or other cardiac rhythmic deformities. When associated with KCNE1, the KvLQT1 channel activates much more slowly and at a more positive membrane potential. It is believed that two KCNE1 proteins interact with a tetrameric KvLQT1 channel, since experimental data suggests that there are 4 alpha subunits and 2 beta subunits in this complex. KVLQT1/KCNE1 channels are taken up from the plasma membrane through a RAB5 dependent mechanism, but inserted into the membrane by RAB11, a GTPase.

== See also ==
- Voltage-gated potassium channel
