= KCNE1 =

Protein-coding gene in the species Homo sapiens

Identifiers
- Aliases: KCNE1, ISK, JLNS, JLNS2, LQT2/5, LQT5, MinK, potassium voltage-gated channel subfamily E regulatory subunit 1
- External IDs: OMIM: 176261; GeneCards: KCNE1
Available structures
PDB	Human UniProt search: PDBe RCSB
PDB	List of PDB id codes 2K21

Gene location (Human)
Chr.	Chromosome 21 (human)
Band	21q22.12	Start	34,446,688 bp
Band	21q22.12	End	34,512,214 bp
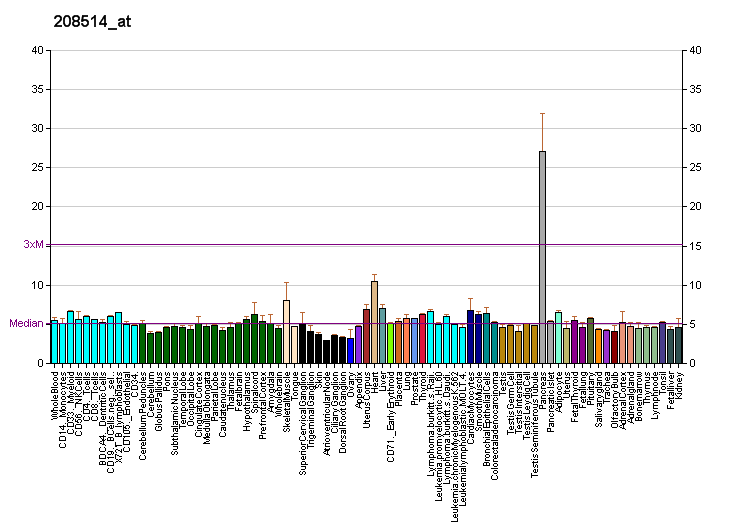
RNA expression pattern
Bgee	Human / Mouse (ortholog); Top expressed in: blood; monocyte; olfactory zone of nasal mucosa; granulocyte; spleen; right lung; upper lobe of left lung; apex of heart; bone marrow cell; fallopian tube / n/a; More reference expression data
BioGPS	More reference expression data
Gene ontology
Molecular function	potassium channel activity; delayed rectifier potassium channel activity; voltage-gated potassium channel activity involved in cardiac muscle cell action potential repolarization; voltage-gated ion channel activity; telethonin binding; potassium channel regulator activity; protein binding; voltage-gated potassium channel activity involved in ventricular cardiac muscle cell action potential repolarization; voltage-gated potassium channel activity; transmembrane transporter binding
Cellular component	membrane; integral component of membrane; voltage-gated potassium channel complex; plasma membrane; cell surface; Z discdkac; apical plasma membrane; membrane raft; lysosome
Biological process	regulation of ion transmembrane transport; protein O-linked glycosylation; ventricular cardiac muscle cell action potential; cardiac muscle cell action potential involved in contraction; ion transport; hearing; potassium ion transport; membrane repolarization; negative regulation of protein targeting to membrane; membrane repolarization during action potential; regulation of delayed rectifier potassium channel activity; cardiac conduction; potassium ion transmembrane transport; positive regulation of potassium ion transmembrane transport; protein N-linked glycosylation; membrane repolarization during cardiac muscle cell action potential; regulation of heart rate by cardiac conduction; regulation of potassium ion transmembrane transport; negative regulation of delayed rectifier potassium channel activity; cellular response to cAMP; regulation of ventricular cardiac muscle cell membrane repolarization; membrane repolarization during ventricular cardiac muscle cell action potential; transport; potassium ion export across plasma membrane
Sources:Amigo / QuickGO
Orthologs
Databases	NCBI: entry; OMA: entry
Species	Human	Mouse
Entrez	3753	n/a
Ensembl	ENSG00000180509	n/a
UniProt	P15382; Q6FHJ6	n/a
RefSeq (mRNA)	NM_000219; NM_001127668; NM_001127669; NM_001127670; NM_001270402 NM_001270403; NM_001270404; NM_001270405	n/a
RefSeq (protein)	NP_000210; NP_001121140; NP_001121141; NP_001121142; NP_001257331 NP_001257332; NP_001257333; NP_001257334; NP_000210.2	n/a
Location (UCSC)	Chr 21: 34.45 – 34.51 Mb	n/a
PubMed search		n/a
- Wikidata
View/Edit Human

Potassium voltage-gated channel subfamily E member 1 is a protein that in humans is encoded by the KCNE1 gene.

Voltage-gated potassium channels (Kv) represent the most complex class of voltage-gated ion channels from both functional and structural standpoints. Their diverse functions include regulating neurotransmitter release, heart rate, insulin secretion, neuronal excitability, epithelial electrolyte transport, smooth muscle contraction, and cell volume.

KCNE1 is one of five members of the KCNE family of Kv channel ancillary or β subunits. It is also known as minK (minimal potassium channel subunit).

== Function ==
KCNE1 is primarily known for modulating the cardiac and epithelial Kv channel alfa subunit, KCNQ1. KCNQ1 and KCNE1 form a complex in human ventricular cardiomyocytes that generates the slowly activating K+ current, IKs. Together with the rapidly activating K+ current (IKr), IKs is important for human ventricular repolarization. KCNQ1 is also essential for the normal function of many different epithelial tissues, but in these non-excitable cells it is thought to be predominantly regulated by KCNE2 or KCNE3.

KCNE1 slows the activation of KCNQ1 5-10 fold, increases its unitary conductance 4-fold, eliminates its inactivation, and alters the manner in which KCNQ1 is regulated by other proteins, lipids and small molecules. The association of KCNE1 with KCNQ1 was discovered 8 years after Takumi and colleagues reported the isolation of a fraction of RNA from rat kidney that, when injected into Xenopus oocytes, produced an unusually slow-activating, voltage-dependent, potassium-selective current. Takumi et al discovered the KCNE1 gene and it was correctly predicted to encode a single-transmembrane domain protein with an extracellular N-terminal domain and a cytosolic C-terminal domain. The ability of KCNE1 to generate this current was confusing because of its simple primary structure and topology, contrasting with the 6-transmembrane domain topology of other known Kv α subunits such as Shaker from Drosophila, cloned 2 years earlier. The mystery was solved when KCNQ1 was cloned and found to co-assemble with KCNE1, and it was shown that Xenopus laevis oocytes endogenously express KCNQ1, which is upregulated by exogenous expression of KCNE1 to generate the characteristic slowly activating current., KCNQ1 is also essential for the normal function of many different epithelial tissues, but in these non-excitable cells it is thought to be predominantly regulated by KCNE2 or KCNE3.

KCNE1 is also reported to regulate two other KCNQ family α subunits, KCNQ4 and KCNQ5. KCNE1 increased both their peak currents in oocyte expression studies, and slowed the activation of the latter.,

KCNE1 also regulates hERG, which is the Kv α subunit that generates ventricular IKr. KCNE1 doubled hERG current when the two were expressed in mammalian cells, although the mechanism for this remains unknown.

Although KCNE1 had no effect when co-expressed with the Kv1.1 α subunit in Chinese Hamster ovary (CHO) cells, KCNE1 traps the N-type (rapidly inactivating) Kv1.4 α subunit in the ER/Golgi when co-expressed with it. KCNE1 (and KCNE2) also has this effect on the two other canonical N-type Kv α subunits, Kv3.3 and Kv3.4. This appears to be a mechanism for ensuring that homomeric N-type channels do not reach the cell surface, as this mode of suppression by KCNE1 or KCNE2 is relieved by co-expression of same-subfamily delayed rectifier (slowly inactivating) α subunits. Thus, Kv1.1 rescued Kv1.4, Kv3.1 rescued Kv3.4; in each of these cases the resultant channels at the membrane were heteromers (e.g., Kv3.1-Kv3.4) and displayed intermediate inactivation kinetics to those of either α subunit alone.,

KCNE1 also regulates the gating kinetics of Kv2.1, Kv3.1 and Kv3.2, in each case slowing their activation and deactivation, and accelerating inactivation of the latter two., No effects were observed upon oocyte co-expression of KCNE1 and Kv4.2, but KCNE1 was found to slow the gating and increase macroscopic current of Kv4.3 in HEK cells. In contrast, channels formed by Kv4.3 and the cytosolic ancillary subunit KChIP2 exhibited faster activation and altered inactivation when co-expressed with KCNE1 in CHO cells. Finally, KCNE1 inhibited Kv12.2 in Xenopus oocytes.

== Structure ==
The large majority of studies into the structural basis for KCNE1 modulation of Kv channels focus on its interaction with KCNQ1 (previously named KvLQT1). Residues in the transmembrane domain of KCNE1 lies close to the selectivity filter of KCNQ1 within heteromeric KCNQ1-KCNE1 channel complexes., The C-terminal domain of KCNE1, specifically from amino acids 73 to 79 is necessary for stimulation of slow delayed potassium rectifier current by SGK1. The interaction of KCNE1 with an alpha helix in the S6 KvLQT1 domain contributes to the higher affinity this channel has for benzodiazepine L7 and chromanol 293B by repositioning amino acid residues to allow for this. KCNE1 destabilizes the S4-S5 alpha-helix linkage in the KCNQ1 channel protein in addition to destabilizing the S6 alpha helix, leading to slower activation of this channel when associated with KCNE1. Variable stohiometries have been discussed but there are probably 2 KCNE1 subunits and 4 KCNQ1 subunits in a plasma membrane IKs complex.

The transmembrane segment of KCNE1 is α-helical when in a membrane environment., The transmembrane segment of KCNE1 has been suggested to interact with the KCNQ1 pore domain (S5/S6) and with the S4 domain of the KCNQ1 (KvLQT1) channel. KCNE1 may bind to the outer part of the KCNQ1 pore domain, and slide from this position into the "activation cleft" which leads to greater current amplitudes

KCNE1 slows KCNQ1 activation several-fold, and there are ongoing discussions about the precise mechanisms underlying this. In a study in which KCNQ1 voltage sensor movement was monitored by site-directed fluorimetry and also by measuring the charge displacement associated with movement of charges within the S4 segment of the voltage sensor (gating current), KCNE1 was found to slow S4 movement so much that the gating current was no longer measurable. Fluorimetry measurements indicated that KCNQ1-KCNE1 channel S4 movement was 30-fold slower than that of the well-studied Drosophila Shaker Kv channel. Nakajo and Kubo found that KCNE1 either slowed KCNQ1 S4 movement upon membrane depolarization, or altered S4 equilibrium at a given membrane potential. The Kass lab deduced that while homomeric KCNQ1 channels can open after the movement of a single S4 segment, KCNQ1-KCNE1 channels can only open after all four S4 segments have been activated. The intracellular C-terminal domain of KCNE1 is thought to sit on the KCNQ1 S4-S5 linker, a segment of KCNQ1 crucial for communicating S4 status to the pore and thus control activation.

== Tissue distribution ==
KCNE1 is expressed in human heart (atria and ventricles), whereas in adult mouse heart its expression appears limited to the atria and/or conduction system. KCNE1 is also expressed in human and murine inner ear and kidneys. KCNE1 has been detected in mouse brain but this finding is a subject of ongoing debate.

== Clinical significance ==
Inherited or sporadic KCNE gene mutations can cause Romano–Ward syndrome (heterozygotes) and Jervell Lange-Nielsens syndrome (homozygotes). Both these syndromes are characterized by Long QT syndrome, a delay in ventricular repolarization. In addition, Jervell and Lange-Nielsen syndrome also involves bilateral sensorineural deafness. Mutation D76N in the KCNE1 protein can lead to long QT syndrome due to structural changes in the KvLQT1/KCNE1 complex, and people with these mutations are advised to avoid triggers of cardiac arrhythmia and prolonged QT intervals, such as stress or strenuous exercise.

While loss-of-function mutations in KCNE1 cause Long QT syndrome, gain-of-function KCNE1 mutations are associated with early-onset atrial fibrillation. A common KCNE1 polymorphism, S38G, is associated with altered predisposition to lone atrial fibrillation and postoperative atrial fibrillation. Atrial KCNE1 expression was downregulated in a porcine model of post-operative atrial fibrillation following lung lobectomy.

Recently an analysis of 32 KCNE1 variants shows that putative/confirmed loss-of-function KCNE1 variants predispose to QT-prolongation, however the low ECG penetrance observed suggests they do not manifest clinically in the majority of individuals, aligning with the mild phenotype observed for JLNS2 patients.

== See also ==
- Jervell and Lange-Nielsen syndrome
- Voltage-gated potassium channel
- KCNE2
- KCNE3
- KCNQ1
