= KCNE2 =

Protein-coding gene in the species Homo sapiens

Identifiers
- Aliases: KCNE2, ATFB4, LQT5, LQT6, MIRP1, potassium voltage-gated channel subfamily E regulatory subunit 2
- External IDs: OMIM: 603796; MGI: 1891123; GeneCards: KCNE2
Available structures
PDB	Ortholog search: PDBe RCSB
PDB	List of PDB id codes 2M0Q

Gene location (Human)
Chr.	Chromosome 21 (human)
Band	21q22.11	Start	34,364,006 bp
Band	21q22.11	End	34,371,381 bp

Gene location (Mouse)
Chr.	Chromosome 16 (mouse)
Band	16|16 C4	Start	92,089,277 bp
Band	16|16 C4	End	92,095,017 bp
RNA expression pattern
Bgee	Human / Mouse (ortholog); Top expressed in: body of stomach; pylorus; cardia; testicle; fundus; gonad; Descending thoracic aorta; duodenum; tibial arteries; right coronary artery / Top expressed in: Epithelium of choroid plexus; epithelium of stomach; vestibular membrane of cochlear duct; mucous cell of stomach; neural layer of retina; pyloric antrum; right lung lobe; epithelium of lens; choroid plexus of lateral ventricle; myocardium of atrium; More reference expression data
BioGPS	n/a
Gene ontology
Molecular function	potassium channel activity; protein homodimerization activity; transmembrane transporter binding; delayed rectifier potassium channel activity; voltage-gated ion channel activity; potassium channel regulator activity; protein binding; voltage-gated potassium channel activity involved in ventricular cardiac muscle cell action potential repolarization; voltage-gated potassium channel activity; inward rectifier potassium channel activity
Cellular component	integral component of membrane; membrane; voltage-gated potassium channel complex; plasma membrane; lysosome; endoplasmic reticulum; Golgi apparatus; cell surface
Biological process	negative regulation of voltage-gated potassium channel activity; tongue development; regulation of inward rectifier potassium channel activity; positive regulation of voltage-gated calcium channel activity; regulation of ion transmembrane transport; ventricular cardiac muscle cell action potential; ageing; cardiac muscle cell action potential involved in contraction; ion transport; potassium ion transport; membrane repolarization; membrane repolarization during action potential; regulation of delayed rectifier potassium channel activity; cardiac conduction; potassium ion transmembrane transport; regulation of membrane repolarization; positive regulation of proteasomal protein catabolic process; regulation of heart rate by cardiac conduction; regulation of potassium ion transmembrane transport; regulation of cyclic nucleotide-gated ion channel activity; negative regulation of delayed rectifier potassium channel activity; regulation of ventricular cardiac muscle cell membrane repolarization; membrane repolarization during ventricular cardiac muscle cell action potential; transport; potassium ion export across plasma membrane; potassium ion import across plasma membrane
Sources:Amigo / QuickGO
Orthologs
Databases	NCBI: entry; OMA: entry
Species	Human	Mouse
Entrez	9992	246133
Ensembl	ENSG00000159197	ENSMUSG00000039672
UniProt	Q9Y6J6	Q9D808
RefSeq (mRNA)	NM_172201; NM_005136	NM_134110; NM_001358372
RefSeq (protein)	NP_751951	NP_598871; NP_001345301
Location (UCSC)	Chr 21: 34.36 – 34.37 Mb	Chr 16: 92.09 – 92.1 Mb
PubMed search
- Wikidata
View/Edit Human	View/Edit Mouse

KCNE2 3D animation

Potassium voltage-gated channel subfamily E member 2 (KCNE2), also known as MinK-related peptide 1 (MiRP1), is a protein that in humans is encoded by the KCNE2 gene on chromosome 21. MiRP1 is a voltage-gated potassium channel accessory subunit (beta subunit) associated with Long QT syndrome. It is ubiquitously expressed in many tissues and cell types. Because of this and its ability to regulate multiple different ion channels, KCNE2 exerts considerable influence on a number of cell types and tissues. Human KCNE2 is a member of the five-strong family of human KCNE genes. KCNE proteins contain a single membrane-spanning region, extracellular N-terminal and intracellular C-terminal. KCNE proteins have been widely studied for their roles in the heart and in genetic predisposition to inherited cardiac arrhythmias. The KCNE2 gene also contains one of 27 SNPs associated with increased risk of coronary artery disease. More recently, roles for KCNE proteins in a variety of non-cardiac tissues have also been explored.

== Discovery ==
Steve Goldstein (then at Yale University) used a BLAST search strategy, focusing on KCNE1 sequence stretches known to be important for function, to identify related expressed sequence tags (ESTs) in the NCBI database. Using sequences from these ESTs, KCNE2, 3 and 4 were cloned.

== Tissue distribution ==
KCNE2 protein is most readily detected in the choroid plexus epithelium, gastric parietal cells, and thyroid epithelial cells. KCNE2 is also expressed in atrial and ventricular cardiomyocytes, the pancreas, pituitary gland, and lung epithelium. In situ hybridization data suggest that KCNE2 transcript may also be expressed in various neuronal populations.

== Structure ==
=== Gene ===
The KCNE2 gene resides on chromosome 21 at the band 21q22.11 and contains 2 exons. Since human KCNE2 is located ~79 kb from KCNE1 and in the opposite direction, KCNE2 is proposed to originate from a gene duplication event.

=== Protein ===
This protein belongs to the potassium channel KCNE family and is one five single transmembrane domain voltage-gated potassium (Kv) channel ancillary subunits. KCNE2 is composed of three major domains: the N-terminal domain, the transmembrane domain, and the C-terminal domain. The N-terminal domain protrudes out of the extracellular side of the cell membrane and is, thus, soluble in the aqueous environment. Meanwhile, the transmembrane and C-terminal domains are lipid-soluble to enable the protein to incorporate into the cell membrane. The C-terminal faces the intracellular side of the membrane and may share a putative PKC phosphorylation site with other KCNE proteins.

Like other KCNEs, KCNE2 forms a heteromeric complex with the Kv α subunits.

== Function ==
=== Choroid plexus epithelium ===
KCNE2 protein is most readily detected in the choroid plexus epithelium, at the apical side. KCNE2 forms complexes there with the voltage-gated potassium channel α subunit, Kv1.3. In addition, KCNE2 forms reciprocally regulating tripartite complexes in the choroid plexus epithelium with the KCNQ1 α subunit and the sodium-dependent myo-inositol transporter, SMIT1. Kcne2-/- mice exhibit increased seizure susceptibility, reduced immobility time in the tail suspension test, and reduced cerebrospinal fluid myo-inositol content, compared to wild-type littermates. Mega-dosing of myo-inositol reverses all these phenotypes, suggesting a link between myo-inositol and the seizure susceptibility and behavioral alterations in Kcne2-/- mice.

=== Gastric epithelium ===
KCNE2 is also highly expressed in parietal cells of the gastric epithelium, also at the apical side. In these cells, KCNQ1-KCNE2 K^{+} channels, which are constitutively active, provide a conduit to return K^{+} ions back to the stomach lumen. The K^{+} ions enter the parietal cell through the gastric H^{+}/K^{+}-ATPase, which swaps them for protons as it acidifies the stomach. While KCNQ1 channels are inhibited by low extracellular pH, KCNQ1-KCNE2 channels activity is augmented by extracellular protons, an ideal characteristic for their role in parietal cells.

=== Thyroid epithelium ===
KCNE2 forms constitutively active K^{+} channels with KCNQ1 in the basolateral membrane of thyroid epithelial cells. Kcne2-/- mice exhibit hypothyroidism, particularly apparent during gestation or lactation. KCNQ1-KCNE2 is required for optimal iodide uptake into the thyroid by the basolateral sodium iodide symporter (NIS). Iodide is required for biosynthesis of thyroid hormones.

=== Heart ===
KCNE2 was originally discovered to regulate hERG channel function. KCNE2 decreases macroscopic and unitary current through hERG, and speeds hERG deactivation. hERG generates IKr, the most prominent repolarizing current in human ventricular cardiomyocytes. hERG, and IKr, are highly susceptible to block by a range of structurally diverse pharmacological agents. This property means that many drugs or potential drugs have the capacity to impair human ventricular repolarization, leading to drug-induced long QT syndrome. KCNE2 may also regulate hyperpolarization-activated, cyclic-nucleotide-gated (HCN) pacemaker channels in human heart and in the hearts of other species, as well as the Cav1.2 voltage-gated calcium channel.

In mice, mERG and KCNQ1, another Kv α subunit regulated by KCNE2, are neither influential nor highly expressed in adult ventricles. However, Kcne2-/- mice exhibit QT prolongation at baseline at 7 months of age, or earlier if provoked with a QT-prolonging agent such as sevoflurane. This is because KCNE2 is a promiscuous regulatory subunit that forms complexes with Kv1.5 and with Kv4.2 in adult mouse ventricular myocytes. KCNE2 increases currents though Kv4.2 channels and slows their inactivation. KCNE2 is required for Kv1.5 to localize to the intercalated discs of mouse ventricular myocytes. Kcne2 deletion in mice reduces the native currents generated in ventricular myocytes by Kv4.2 and Kv1.5, namely I_{to} and I_{Kslow}, respectively.

== Clinical significance ==
=== Gastric epithelium ===
Kcne2-/- mice exhibit achlorhydria, gastric hyperplasia, and mis-trafficking of KCNQ1 to the parietal cell basal membrane. The mis-trafficking occurs because KCNE3 is upregulated in the parietal cells of Kcne2-/- mice, and hijacks KCNQ1, taking it to the basolateral membrane. When both Kcne2 and Kcne3 are germline-deleted in mice, KCNQ1 traffics to the parietal cell apical membrane but the gastric phenotype is even worse than for Kcne2-/- mice, emphasizing that KCNQ1 requires KCNE2 co-assembly for functional attributes other than targeting in parietal cells. Kcne2-/- mice also develop gastritis cystica profunda and gastric neoplasia. Human KCNE2 downregulation is also observed in sites of gastritis cystica profunda and gastric adenocarcinoma.

=== Thyroid epithelium ===
Positron emission tomography data show that with KCNE2, 124I uptake by the thyroid is impaired. Kcne2 deletion does not impair organification of iodide once it has been taken up by NIS. Pups raised by Kcne2-/- dams are particularly severely affected becauset they receive less milk (hypothyroidism of the dams impairs milk ejection), the milk they receive is deficient in T_{4}, and they themselves cannot adequately transport iodide into the thyroid. Kcne2-/- pups exhibit stunted growth, alopecia, cardiomegaly and reduced cardiac ejection fraction, all of which are alleviated by thyroid hormone supplementation of pups or dams. Surrogating Kcne2-/- pups with Kcne2+/+ dams also alleviates these phenotypes, highlighting the influence of maternal genotype in this case.

=== Heart ===
As observed for hERG mutations, KCNE2 loss-of-function mutations are associated with inherited long QT syndrome, and hERG-KCNE2 channels carrying the mutations show reduced activity compared to wild-type channels. In addition, some KCNE2 mutations and also more common polymorphisms are associated with drug-induced long QT syndrome. In several cases, specific KCNE2 sequence variants increase the susceptibility to hERG-KCNE2 channel inhibition by the drug that precipitated the QT prolongation in the patient from which the gene variant was isolated. Long QT syndrome predisposes to potentially lethal ventricular cardiac arrhythmias including torsades de pointe, which can degenerate into ventricular fibrillation and sudden cardiac death. Moreover, KCNE2 gene variation can disrupt HCN1-KCNE2 channel function and this may potentially contribute to cardiac arrhythmogenesis. KCNE2 is also associated with familial atrial fibrillation, which may involve excessive KCNQ1-KCNE2 current caused by KCNE2 gain-of-function mutations.

Recently, a battery of extracardiac effects were discovered in Kcne2-/- mice that may contribute to cardiac arrhythmogenesis in Kcne2-/- mice and could potentially contribute to human cardiac arrhythmias if similar effects are observed in human populations. Kcne2 deletion in mice causes anemia, glucose intolerance, dyslipidemia, hyperkalemia and elevated serum angiotensin II. Some or all of these might contribute to predisposition to sudden cardiac death in Kcne2-/- mice in the context of myocardial ischemia and post-ischemic arrhythmogenesis.

==== Clinical marker ====
A multi-locus genetic risk score study based on a combination of 27 loci, including the KCNE2 gene, identified individuals at increased risk for both incident and recurrent coronary artery disease events, as well as an enhanced clinical benefit from statin therapy. The study was based on a community cohort study (the Malmo Diet and Cancer study) and four additional randomized controlled trials of primary prevention cohorts (JUPITER and ASCOT) and secondary prevention cohorts (CARE and PROVE IT-TIMI 22).

== See also ==
- Voltage-gated potassium channel
- KCNE1
- KCNE3
- KCNQ1
