= SGK3 =

Protein-coding gene in the species Homo sapiens

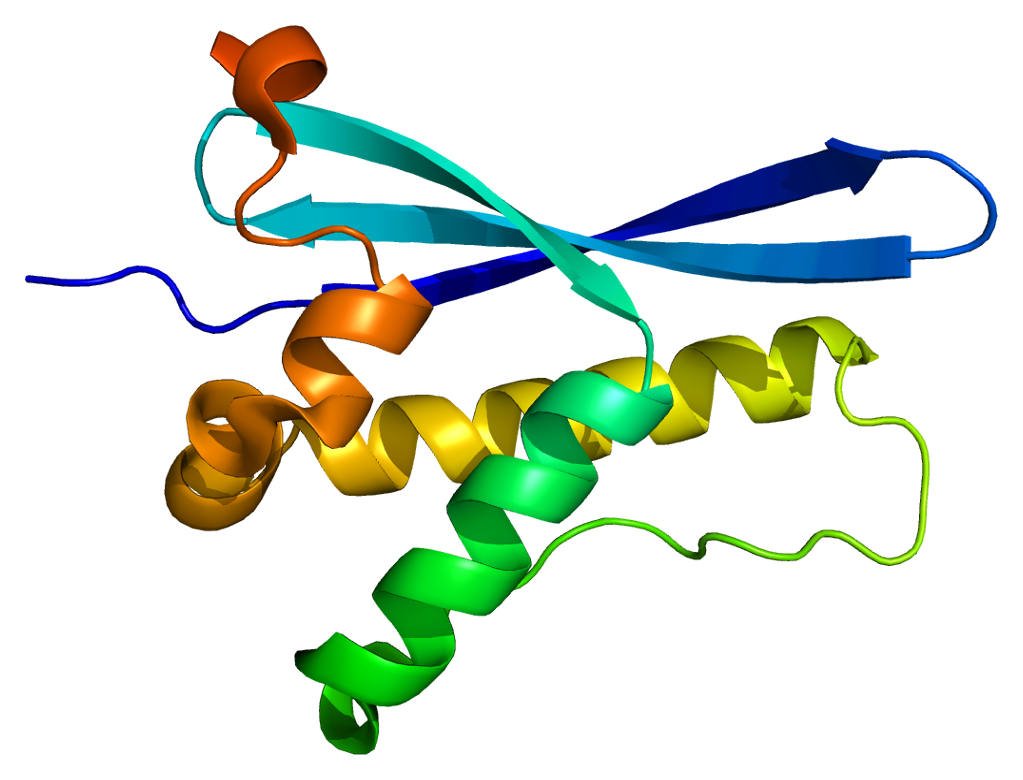

Identifiers
- Aliases: SGK3, CISK, SGK2, SGKL, serum/glucocorticoid regulated kinase family member 3
- External IDs: OMIM: 607591; MGI: 2182368; GeneCards: SGK3
Enzyme activity
EC #	BRENDA	ExPASy	KEGG	MetaCyc
2.7.11.1	↗	↗	↗	↗

Gene location (Human)
Chr.	Chromosome 8 (human)
Band	8q13.1	Start	66,712,734 bp
Band	8q13.1	End	66,862,022 bp

Gene location (Mouse)
Chr.	Chromosome 1 (mouse)
Band	1 A2|1 2.08 cM	Start	9,868,332 bp
Band	1 A2|1 2.08 cM	End	9,971,070 bp
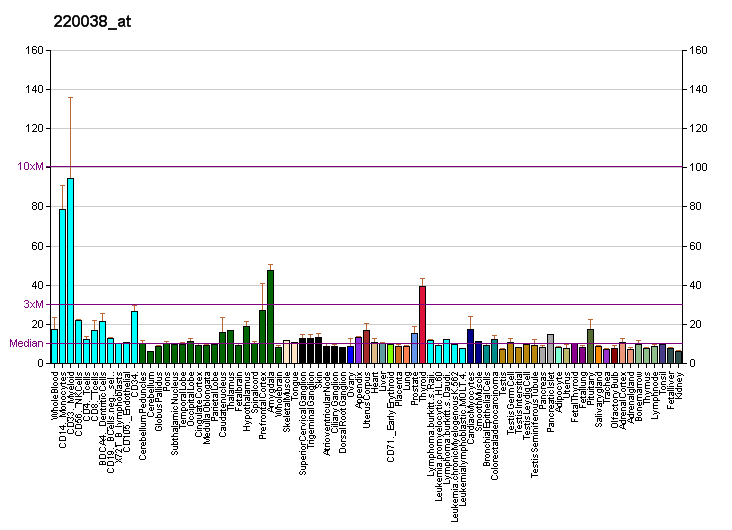
RNA expression pattern
Bgee	Human / Mouse (ortholog); Top expressed in: retinal pigment epithelium; corpus callosum; inferior ganglion of vagus nerve; mucosa of ileum; subthalamic nucleus; skin of arm; pars reticulata; jejunal mucosa; medulla oblongata; skin of hip / Top expressed in: vestibular membrane of cochlear duct; retinal pigment epithelium; Epithelium of choroid plexus; molar; gastrula; granulocyte; hair follicle; endothelial cell of lymphatic vessel; cornea; stria vascularis; More reference expression data
BioGPS	More reference expression data
Gene ontology
Molecular function	transferase activity; protein kinase activity; nucleotide binding; sodium channel regulator activity; calcium channel regulator activity; kinase activity; potassium channel regulator activity; protein binding; phosphatidylinositol binding; chloride channel regulator activity; ATP binding; protein serine/threonine kinase activity
Cellular component	recycling endosome; cytosol; endosome; early endosome; cytoplasmic vesicle
Biological process	regulation of apoptotic process; intracellular signal transduction; regulation of cell migration; positive regulation of transporter activity; phosphorylation; protein phosphorylation; ion transmembrane transport; regulation of cell population proliferation; peptidyl-serine phosphorylation; regulation of DNA-binding transcription factor activity; regulation of cell growth; negative regulation of extrinsic apoptotic signaling pathway in absence of ligand
Sources:Amigo / QuickGO
Orthologs
Databases	NCBI: entry; OMA: entry
Species	Human	Mouse
Entrez	23678	170755
Ensembl	ENSG00000104205	ENSMUSG00000025915
UniProt	Q96BR1	Q9ERE3
RefSeq (mRNA)	NM_170709; NM_001033578; NM_013257	NM_001037759; NM_133220; NM_177547
RefSeq (protein)	NP_001191102; NP_001028750; NP_037389; NP_733827	NP_001032848; NP_573483; NP_808215
Location (UCSC)	Chr 8: 66.71 – 66.86 Mb	Chr 1: 9.87 – 9.97 Mb
PubMed search
- Wikidata
View/Edit Human	View/Edit Mouse

Serine/threonine-protein kinase Sgk3 is an enzyme that in humans is encoded by the SGK3 gene.

== Function ==
This gene is a member of the serine/threonine protein kinase family and encodes a phosphoprotein with a PX (phox homology) domain. The protein phosphorylates several target proteins and has a role in neutral amino acid transport and activation of potassium and chloride channels. Alternate transcriptional splice variants, encoding different isoforms, have been characterized.

In melanocytic cells SGK3 gene expression may be regulated by MITF.

== Interactions ==
SGK3 has been shown to interact with GSK3B.
