= SGK =

Protein family

Serine/threonine-protein kinases SGK represent a kinase subfamily with orthologs found across animal clades and in yeast (compare Treefam family TF320906). In most vertebrates, including humans, there are three isoforms encoded by the genes SGK1, SGK2, and SGK3. The name Serum/glucocorticoid-regulated kinase refers to the first cloning of a SGK family member from a cDNA library screen for genes upregulated by the glucocorticoid dexamethasone in a rat mammary epithelial tumor cell line. The first human family member (human SGK1) was cloned in a screen of hepatocellular genes regulated in response to cellular hydration or swelling.

The term SGK is also used as a synonym for SGK1.

== Function ==
Among the three SGK genes, the SGK1 gene is the most intensively studied. This gene encodes a serine/threonine protein kinase that is highly similar to the rat serum-and glucocorticoid-induced protein kinase (SGK). This gene was identified in a screen of hepatocellular genes regulated in response to cellular hydration or swelling. Cellular hydration is a catabolic signal, stimulating glycogenolysis and proteolysis, and inhibiting protein and glycogen synthesis. This kinase has been shown to be important in activating certain potassium, sodium, and chloride channels. Expression of this gene in hepatocytes is stimulated by transforming growth factor-beta (TGF-beta), which participates in the pathophysiology of diabetic complications. Since both TGF-beta expression and SGK expression are elevated in diabetic nephropathy, an involvement of SGK in the development of this condition is suggested.

The SGK1 kinase regulates the myo-inositol transporter during osmotic stress.

Deregulated expression of SGK1 in the endometrium has been implicated in cases of infertility or recurrent miscarriage in humans, and SGK1 expression in the endometrium also affects fertility in mice.
