= TWA (disambiguation) =

TWA was Trans World Airlines, an American airline (1930–2001) which was acquired by American Airlines and subsequently liquidated.

TWA may also refer to:

== Arts and entertainment ==
- "TWA" (song), 1982, by Ted Hawkins
- Texas Wrestling Academy, founded 1999
- Tri-State Wrestling Alliance, 1992–2001
- The Wrestling Alliance, a UK wrestling promotion 1989-2003 which had a 2002-2003 promotional war with All Star Wrestling

== Transport ==
- Transport and Works Act 1992, a UK law on public transport infrastructure
- True wind angle, in sailing
- Trailing wire antenna, on Boeing E-4 aircraft

== Other uses ==
- Twa, an ethnic group native to the African Great Lakes region
- T wave alternans, in electrocardiography
- Teeny Weeny Afro, a hairstyle
- Towerrunning World Association, a tower running sports body
- Time-weighted average (PEL), under US safety laws
- Time-weighted average price, of a financial security
- Traveling-wave antenna
