= QT interval variability =

QT interval variability (QTV) refers to the physiological phenomenon of beat-to-beat fluctuations in QT interval of electrocardiograms. Increased QTV appears to be a marker of arrhythmic and cardiovascular death; it may also play a role for noninvasive assessment of sympathetic nervous system activity.

Other terms used include: "QT variability", "beat-to-beat variability of ventricular repolarization (BRV)"

Beat-to-beat measurement of QT interval using two-dimensional signal warping (2DSW).

== QT interval measurement ==
Under normal resting conditions, beat-to-beat changes in QT interval are very small with a standard deviation typically below 5 ms. Digital high resolution ECG sampled at 300 Hz or higher and dedicated computer algorithms are required for QTV assessment. Template-based algorithms that use parts of, or the entire ECG waveform usually deliver good results; template stretching or warping techniques perform comparably well in the presence of noise.

== QTV Analysis ==
A number of metrics have been proposed for QTV quantification. The QT variability index (QTVi) has been most frequently reported in the literature: $QTVi = \log\frac{SDQT^2/(QT_{mean})^2}{SDHR^2/(HR_{mean})^2}$, where $SDQT$, $SDHR$, $QT_{mean}$, and $HR_{mean}$ denote standard deviation and mean of QT interval and heart rate time series, respectively.

More advanced approaches that take into account the relationship between QTV and heart rate variability include vector autoregressive process models and information domain approaches.

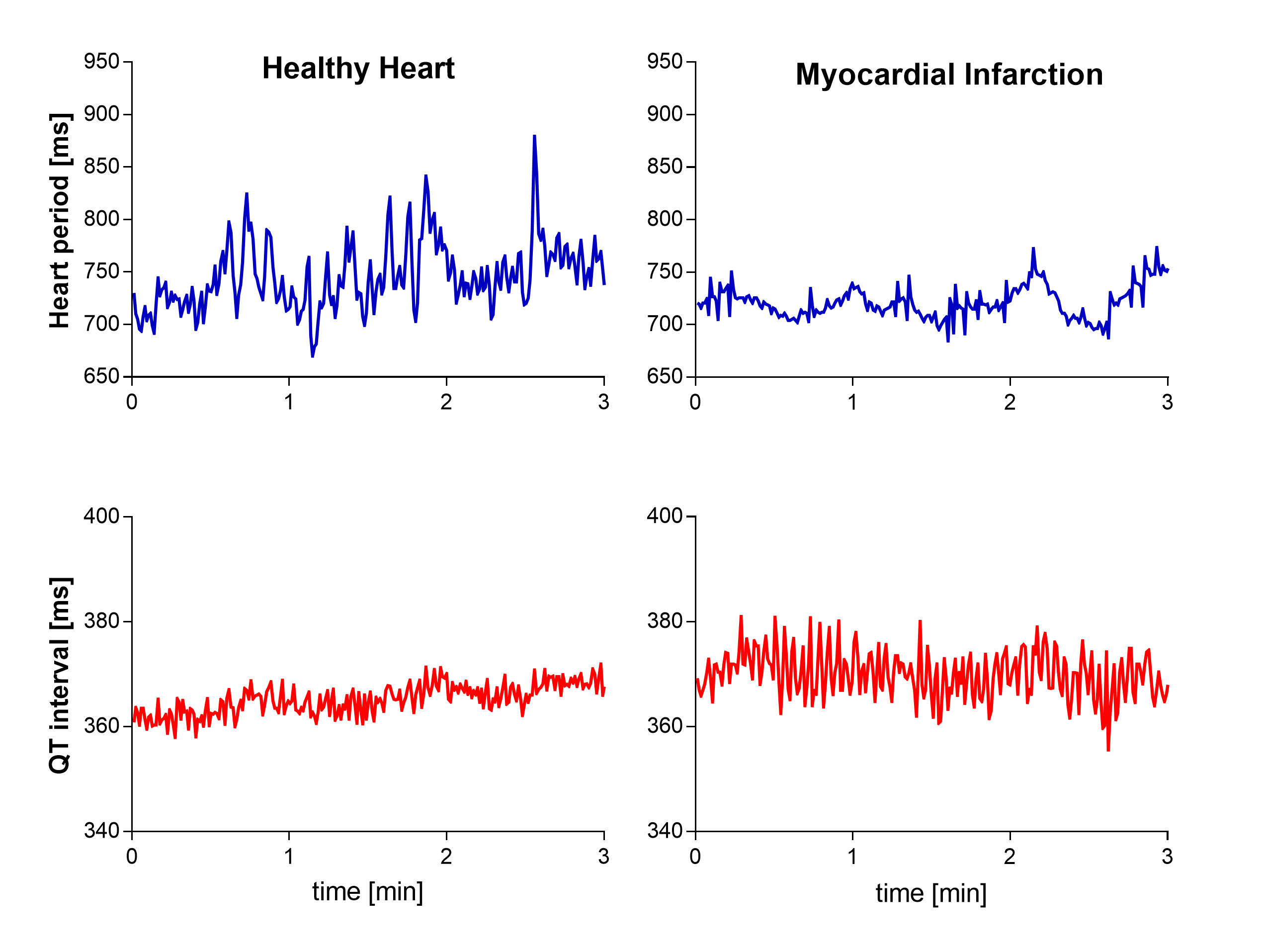
Example traces of heart rate and QT interval variability in a normal heart and after myocardial infarction.
