= T-wave =

The term T-wave may refer to:

- T wave, a portion of the recording of a heartbeat in an electrocardiogram
- Terahertz radiation, electromagnetic radiation in the microwave band
- T wave (seismic), a form of seismic wave
