= T wave alternans =

Periodic variation in the T wave of an electrocardiogram

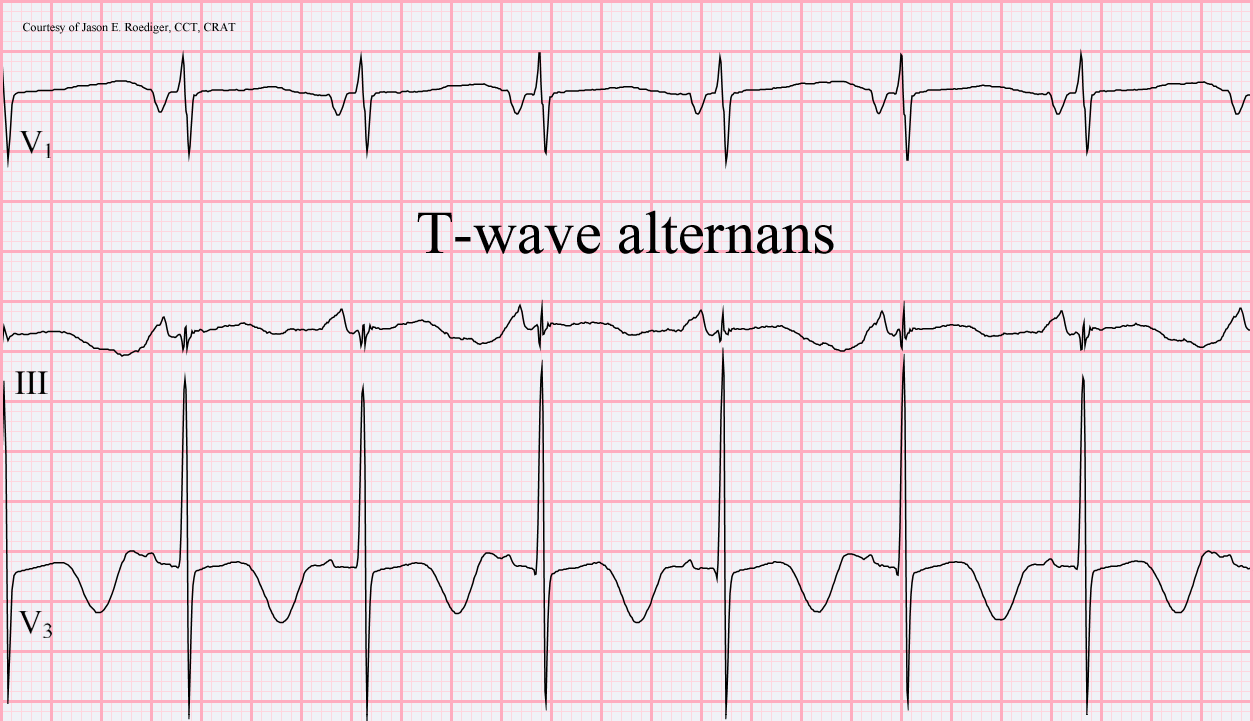
T-wave alternans and prolonged QT interval in a male patient found to be in a narrow-complex tachycardia and ruled in for an acute myocardial infarction. Administered Ibutilide and converted to sinus rhythm but subsequently had an episode of Torsades de Pointes which required DC cardioversion back into sinus rhythm.

In cardiology, T wave alternans (TWA) is a periodic beat-to-beat variation in the amplitude or shape of the T wave in an electrocardiogram (ECG or EKG). TWA was first described in 1908. At that time, only large variations ("macroscopic" TWA) could be detected. Those large TWAs were associated with increased susceptibility to lethal ventricular tachycardias.

Most modern references to TWA refer to microvolt T wave alternans (MTWA), a non-invasive heart test that can identify patients who are at increased risk of sudden cardiac death. It is most often used in patients who have had myocardial infarctions (heart attacks) or other heart damage to see if they are at high risk of developing a potentially lethal cardiac arrhythmia. Those who are found to be at high risk would therefore benefit from the placement of a defibrillator device which can stop an arrhythmia and save the patient's life.

The TWA test uses an ECG measurement of the heart's electrical conduction using electrodes attached to one's torso. It takes approximately a half-hour to perform on an outpatient basis. The test looks for the presence of repolarization alternans (T-wave alternans), which is variation in the vector and amplitude of the T wave component of the EKG. The amount of variation is small, on the order of microvolts, so sensitive digital signal processing techniques are required to detect TWA. See also wikidoc article on TWA.

== Microvolt T wave Alternans (MTWA) ==
Microvolt T wave alternans is a variant of T wave alternans that detects T wave alternans signals as small as one-millionth of a volt. Microvolt T wave alternans is defined as an alternation in the morphology of the T wave in an every other beat or AB-AB pattern. It has long been associated with ventricular arrhythmias and sudden death. First recognized nearly a century ago, visually discernible alternans were linked to the rapid onset of ventricular tachyarrhythmias.

=== Historical Development ===
Research conducted in the early 1980s by Dr. Richard Cohen and his colleagues at MIT explored the idea that visually indiscernible alternans may be equally significant. These efforts established a link between visually imperceptible alternans at the microvolt level and susceptibility to arrhythmias and showed alternans to be a heart rate dependent phenomenon. In addition, Dr. Joseph Smith, working with Dr. Cohen developed a methodology known as the Spectral Method which allowed measurement of alternans at the level of one microvolt.

=== Clinical significance ===
Microvolt T wave alternans testing acts as a risk stratifier between patients who need implantable cardiac defibrillators (ICDs) and those who do not. Patients who test negative for MTWA are less likely to require an ICD than those who test positive. In some cases, the test is equivalent to a more invasive electrophysiology (EP) study.

Multiple prospective clinical trials indicate that patients from broad groups of at risk populations who test MTWA negative will likely live ventricular event-free for 12 to 24 months after their initial MTWA test.

MTWA results are given as positive, negative, or indeterminate. Those with indeterminate results can be tested again. Otherwise, positive and indeterminate results are often lumped together when making clinical judgments about the likelihood of sudden cardiac death. In patients who have a negative (normal) MTWA test the risk of sudden cardiac death is very low. The Negative Predictive Value of MTWA testing has been shown to be 98% accurate for follow-up periods of 12–24 months in various clinical studies. Negative patients should be retested every 12 months as cardiac function can change over time.

Patients who test MTWA positive or indeterminate for heart rate or dense ectopy (abnormal) should be referred to an electrophysiologist for further evaluation.

Patients who have an indeterminate test should be retested immediately. Studies indicate that over 50% of patients who initially test as indeterminate, become determinate if retested during the same session.

Two methods are currently FDA-cleared to perform MTWA testing in the U.S., namely, the Spectral Method, which was developed by Cohen and Smith at M.I.T. and was commercialized by Cambridge Heart, and the Modified Moving Average (MMA) method, which was developed by Nearing and Verrier at Harvard Medical School, Beth Israel Deaconess Medical Center, and is commercialized by GE Healthcare. The Spectral Method requires a specialized exercise protocol and proprietary electrodes and washout of beta-adrenergic blocking agents to allow the patient to achieve a target heart rate of 105-110 beats/min. The MMA method uses routine, symptom-limited exercise stress testing or ambulatory ECG monitoring and standard electrodes and requires that chronic medications be retained. Both methods achieve 1-microvolt resolution. Interpretation of Spectral Method test results is described above. With the MMA method, risk is defined by the peak MTWA level, with cutpoints of 47μV and 60 μV for abnormal and severely abnormal risk, respectively. Quantification of TWA levels allows physicians to track patients' responses to medications and cardiac rehabilitation.

Over 8000 subjects have been enrolled in Spectral Method studies that predicted outcomes, including the ALPHA study and the ABCD study. An additional 3145 (28% of total) subjects were enrolled in Spectral Method studies that did not predict outcomes, including the SCD-HeFT TWA substudy, the MASTER study, and the CARISMA study. Over 5000 patients have been enrolled in MMA studies, with >3500 in the FINCAVAS exercise-based series. The remaining 1500 patients were studied during ambulatory ECG monitoring. All MMA-based TWA studies have predicted outcomes. A head-to-head comparison of the Spectral and MMA methods revealed similar hazard ratios, kappa statistics, and areas under the receiver-operator characteristic curve. The MTWA consensus guideline, authored by 11 experts in both methods, described both methods, their history, and their utility. A trial of MTWA-guided ICD implantation, REFINE-ICD (NCT00673842), is underway. MTWA testing has been recommended for ventricular arrhythmia risk assessment by the American College of Cardiology, American Heart Association and European Society of Cardiology and by CMS in National Coverage Analysis for Implantable Cardioverter Defibrillators (CAG-00157N).

=== Economics of MTWA ===
This test is significant for insurance companies because it can potentially save thousands of dollars per patient by reducing the implantation of unnecessary implantable cardiac defibrillators (ICD's). Use of the spectral method for measuring Microvolt T-wave Alternans has been approved for reimbursement by Medicare, as well as major insurers such as Aetna, Cigna, and Humana. The Spectral Method was FDA approved in 2001 and approved in 2006 for federal reimbursement by the Center for Medicare and Medicaid Services (CMS), (CAG-00293N). The MMA method received federal approval for local CMS contractor reimbursement in 2015 (CAG-00293R2). Both methods use CPT code 93025.

=== MTWA and NASA ===
In 2004 & 2005, NASA's Glenn Research Center and Cleveland's MetroHealth Medical Center, Case Western Reserve University, teamed to investigate the value of MTWA testing for astronauts both pre- and during space flight. Experiments were performed both on the ground and on NASA's KC-135 aircraft.
