= Louis Sigurd Fridericia =

Louis Sigurd Fridericia (24 February 1881 – February 1947) was a Danish hygienist and professor born in Copenhagen.

Fridericia's family moved to Denmark in the 1750s and took as a name a form of the name of the Jutland town, Fredericia, where they settled. He attended the University of Copenhagen and graduated in medicine in 1906.

He became a physician that year and received further education from Christian Bohr (1855-1911) in Copenhagen, Ernst Leopold Salkowski (1844-1923) in Berlin, Georges Dreyer (1873-1934) and Francis Gotch (1853-1913) at Oxford.

In Copenhagen, he was an assistant at the institutes of physiology, bacteriology and general pathology, and assistant physician at the Rigshospitalet, the Kommunehospitalet and the Bispebjerg Hospital.

He was habilitated in 1910 and in 1918 was appointed Professor of Hygiene. His first works concern the study of metabolism, respiration and circulation, his later works nutritional hygiene and nutritional physiology. He is most known for his repolarization correction formula of the QT interval QTcF.

Fridericia went into hiding after the Nazi occupation of Denmark and, in 1943, was smuggled to Sweden hidden in a fishing boat. He then went to London where he remained until the liberation. His wife, the violinist Karen (Monies) Fridericia, died of overwork a few days after their return to Denmark, and he never really recovered from the shock. He died of an inoperable cancer that had affected his liver, spleen and aorta.
