= Torsades de pointes =

Type of abnormal heart rhythm

Torsades de pointes or Twisting of the Points
- Other names: Torsade(s)
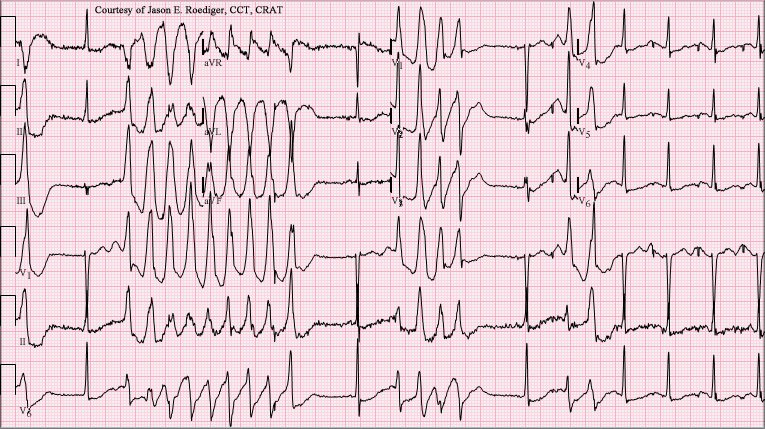
- 12-lead ECG of torsades de pointes (TdP) in a 56-year-old white female with low blood potassium (2.4 mmol/L) and low blood magnesium (1.6 mg/dL)
- Specialty: Cardiology
- Complications: Cardiac arrest
- Causes: Hereditary, certain drugs, electrolyte disorders which cause increased QT interval
- Risk factors: Medications, hypokalemia, hypomagnesemia, hypocalcemia, bradycardia, heart failure, left ventricular hypertrophy, hypothermia, subarachnoid hemorrhage, hypothyroidism
- Deaths: ~5% of 300,000 sudden cardiac deaths in the US

Torsades de pointes, torsade de pointes or torsades des pointes (TdP; also called torsades) (/tɔːrˌsɑːd də ˈpwæ̃t/, French: [tɔʁsad də pwɛ̃t̪], translated as "twisting of peaks") is a specific type of abnormal heart rhythm that can lead to sudden cardiac death. It is a polymorphic ventricular tachycardia that exhibits distinct characteristics on the electrocardiogram (ECG). It was described by French physician François Dessertenne in 1966. Prolongation of the QT interval can increase a person's risk of developing this abnormal heart rhythm, occurring in between 1% and 10% of patients who receive QT-prolonging antiarrhythmic drugs.

== Signs and symptoms ==
Most episodes will revert spontaneously to a normal sinus rhythm. Symptoms and consequences include palpitations, dizziness, lightheadedness (during shorter episodes), fainting (during longer episodes), and sudden cardiac death.

== Causes ==
Torsades occurs as both an inherited (linked to at least 17 genes) and as an acquired form caused most often by drugs and/or electrolyte disorders that cause excessive lengthening of the QT interval.

Common causes for torsades de pointes include drug-induced QT prolongation and, less often diarrhea, low serum magnesium, and low serum potassium or congenital long QT syndrome. It can be seen in malnourished individuals and chronic alcoholics, due to a deficiency in potassium and/or magnesium. Certain drugs and combinations of drugs resulting in drug interactions are common contributors to torsades de pointes risk. QT-prolonging medications such as clarithromycin, levofloxacin, or haloperidol, when taken concurrently with cytochrome P450 inhibitors, such as fluoxetine, cimetidine, or particular foods including grapefruit, can result in higher-than-normal levels of medications that prolong the QT interval in the bloodstream and therefore increase a person's risk of developing torsades de pointes. A TdP cardiac event precipitated by loperamide has been reported (although the dose was well beyond the therapeutic range of the medication).

=== Medications as causes ===
Knowledge that TdP may occur in patients taking certain prescription drugs has been both a major liability and a reason for the removal of 14 medications from the marketplace. Forty-nine drugs known to cause TdP and another 170 that are known to prolong QT remain on the market because the drugs provide medical benefit and the risk of TdP can be managed and mitigated by instructions in the drug label. Examples of compounds linked to clinical observations of TdP include amiodarone, most fluoroquinolones, methadone, chloroquine, erythromycin, azithromycin, pimozide, and phenothiazines. The anti-emetic agent ondansetron may also increase the risk of developing TdP. It has also been shown as a side effect of certain anti-arrhythmic medications, such as sotalol, procainamide, quinidine, ibutilide, and dofetilide. In one example, the gastrokinetic drug cisapride (Propulsid) was withdrawn from the US market in 2000 after it was linked to deaths caused by long QT syndrome-induced torsades de pointes. This effect can be directly linked to QT prolongation mediated predominantly by inhibition of the hERG channel and, in some cases, augmentation of the late sodium channel.

== Risk factors ==
Lead II ECG showing a TdP patient being shocked by an implantable cardioverter-defibrillator back to their baseline cardiac rhythm

The following is a partial list of factors associated with an increased tendency towards developing torsades de pointes:

- Medications
- Hypokalemia (low serum potassium)
- Hypomagnesemia (low serum magnesium)
- Hypocalcemia (low serum calcium)
- Bradycardia (slow heartbeat)
- Heart failure
- Left ventricular hypertrophy
- Hypothermia
- Subarachnoid hemorrhage
- Hypothyroidism

== Pathophysiology ==
The action potential of cardiac muscles can be broken down into five phases:

- Phase 0: Sodium channels open, resulting in the entrance of Na^{+} into the cells; this results in the depolarization of the cardiac muscles.
- Phase 1: Sodium channels close; this stops depolarization. Potassium channels open, leading to an outward current of K^{+} out of the cells.
- Phase 2: Potassium channels remain open (outward current of K^{+}), and calcium channels now also open (inward current of Ca^{++}), resulting in a plateau state.
- Phase 3: Calcium channels close (inward Ca^{++} stops), but potassium channels are still open (outward K^{+} current); this persists until the cells gain back normal polarization (repolarization achieved). Please note that phase 0 leads to a net gain of Na^{+}, while phases 1–3 lead to a net loss of K^{+}. This imbalance is corrected by the Na^{+}/K^{+}-ATPase channel that pumps K^{+} into the cell and sodium out of the cell; this does not change polarization of the cells, but does restore ionic content to its initial state.
- Phase 4: Exciting triggers (e.g., sinus node) will cause minor depolarization in the cells; this will result in increasing permeability of sodium channels, which trigger the opening of sodium channels.

Repolarization of the cardiomyocytes occurs in phases 1–3 and is caused predominantly by the outward movement of potassium ions. In Torsades de pointes, however, the repolarization is prolonged; this can be due to electrolyte disturbances (hypokalemia, hypomagnesemia, hypocalcemia), bradycardia, certain drugs (disopyramide, sotalol, amiodarone, amitriptyline, chlorpromazine, erythromycin) and/or congenital syndromes.

The prolongation of repolarisation may result in subsequent activation of an inward depolarisation current, known as an early after-depolarisation, which may promote triggered activity. Re-entry, due to a dispersion of refractory periods, is also possible; this is because M Cells (found in the mid-myocardial layer) show a more prolonged repolarization phase in response to potassium blockage than other cells. In turn, this produces a zone of functional refractoriness (inability to depolarize) in the mid-myocardial layer. When a new action potential is generated, the mid-myocardial layer will remain in a refractory period, but the surrounding tissue will depolarize. As soon as the mid-myocardial layer is no longer in a refractory period, excitation from nearby tissue will cause a retrograde current and a reentry circuit that will result in a positive chronotropic cycle, leading to tachycardia.

== Diagnosis ==
The ECG tracing in torsades demonstrates a polymorphic ventricular tachycardia with a characteristic illusion of a twisting of the QRS complex around the isoelectric baseline (peaks, which are at first pointing up, appear to be pointing down for subsequent "beats" when looking at ECG traces of the "heartbeat"). It is hemodynamically unstable and causes a sudden drop in arterial blood pressure, leading to dizziness and fainting. Depending on their cause, most individual episodes of torsades de pointes revert to normal sinus rhythm within a few seconds; however, episodes may also persist and possibly degenerate into ventricular fibrillation, leading to sudden death in the absence of prompt medical intervention. Torsades de pointes is associated with long QT syndrome, a condition whereby prolonged QT intervals are visible on an ECG. Long QT intervals predispose the patient to an R-on-T phenomenon, wherein the R-wave, representing ventricular depolarization, occurs during the relative refractory period at the end of repolarization (represented by the latter half of the T-wave). An R-on-T can initiate torsades. Sometimes, pathologic T-U waves may be seen in the ECG before the initiation of torsades.

A "short-coupled variant of torsade de pointes", which presents without long QT syndrome, was also described in 1994 as having the following characteristics:

- Drastic rotation of the heart's electrical axis
- Prolonged QT interval (LQTS) - may not be present in the short-coupled variant of torsade de pointes
- Preceded by long and short RR-intervals - not present in the short-coupled variant of torsade de pointes
- Triggered by a premature ventricular contraction (R-on-T PVC)

== R-on-T phenomenon ==
The R-on-T phenomenon is the superimposition of a premature ventricular contraction on the T wave of a preceding heartbeat. Studies suggest that the R-on-T phenomenon is likely to start a sustained ventricular tachycardia and ventricular fibrillation. It's considered a cardiac arrhythmia in which the ventricles of the heart become again excited during the repolarization of the previous heart action. Because part of the heart muscle cannot be excited at this early point in time, a premature chamber action can trigger life-threatening cardiac arrhythmias (e.g., ventricular fibrillation or Torsades de pointes).

On the ECG, this phenomenon is shown when a ventricular extrasystole (R) (T-wave) is superimposed during the repolarization phase of the previous action of the heart. Not all premature chamber actions can trigger these dangerous arrhythmias; the risk is increased with ischemia of the heart muscle or with prolonged repolarization time (long QT syndrome). The arrhythmia can also be triggered when an external stimulus such as cardioversion falls in the vulnerable phase of the cardiac cycle.

In the Lown grading system of ventricular arrhythmias, the R-on-T phenomenon is the fifth, most threatening class.

== Treatment ==
The treatment of torsades de pointes aims to restore a normal rhythm and to prevent the arrhythmia from recurring. While torsades may spontaneously revert to a normal sinus rhythm, sustained torsades requires emergency treatment to prevent cardiac arrest. Intravenous magnesium sulfate is the first-line agent recommended for immediate treatment of torsades. Electrical cardioversion – a procedure in which an electrical current is applied across the heart to temporarily stop and then resynchronise the heart's cells - is also necessary in some cases and performed in conjunction with magnesium sulfate infusion. Treatment to prevent recurrent torsades includes infusion of magnesium sulfate, correction of electrolyte imbalances such as low blood potassium levels (hypokalaemia), and withdrawal of any medications that prolong the QT interval. Treatments used to prevent torsades in specific circumstances include beta blockers or mexiletine in long QT syndrome. Occasionally a pacemaker may be used to accelerate the heart's own sinus rhythm, and those at risk of further torsades may be offered an implantable defibrillator to automatically detect and defibrillate further episodes of the arrhythmia.

Magnesium is used in the treatment of torsades de pointes because it functions as a physiologic calcium channel blocker. By blocking the calcium channels in phase 2 of the myocardial action potential, magnesium suppresses the early afterdepolarizations that occur in this phase with calcium influx into the cell.

== History ==
The phenomenon was originally described in a French medical journal by Dessertenne in 1966, when he observed this cardiac rhythm disorder in an 80-year-old female patient with complete intermittent atrioventricular block. In coining the term, he referred his colleagues to the "Dictionnaire Le Robert", a bilingual French English dictionary, of which his wife had just given him a copy. Here, "torsade" is defined as:

- a bundle of threads, twisted in a helix or spiral, for ornamental purposes (such as in an Aran sweater);
- long hair twisted together;
- an ornamental motif, as seen on architectural columns.

== Terminology ==
The singular and plural forms (torsade de pointes, torsades de pointes) have often been used. The question of whether each one is grammatically "correct" and the others "incorrect" has repeatedly arisen. This is seen among major medical dictionaries, where one enters only the plural form, another enters the plural form as the headword but lists the singular as a variant, and yet another enters the singular form as the headword and gives a usage comment saying that the plural is not preferred. One group of physicians has suggested that it would make the most sense to use the singular form to refer to the arrhythmia entity (where an arrhythmia may involve one or multiple episodes), and that one might best reserve the plural form for describing repeated twisting during a single episode. Other authors have suggested all three words should be plural.
