= François Dessertenne =

French physician (1917–2006)

François Dessertenne (1917–2006) was a French physician who first described the special type of ventricular tachycardia in 1966 known as Torsades de pointes. In 1948, Dessertenne became the Assistant Professor of Medicine at Hôpital Lariboisière in France, assisting to Prof Yves Bouvrain (1910-2002).
