= Anion exchange protein 3 =

Protein found in humans

SLC4A3
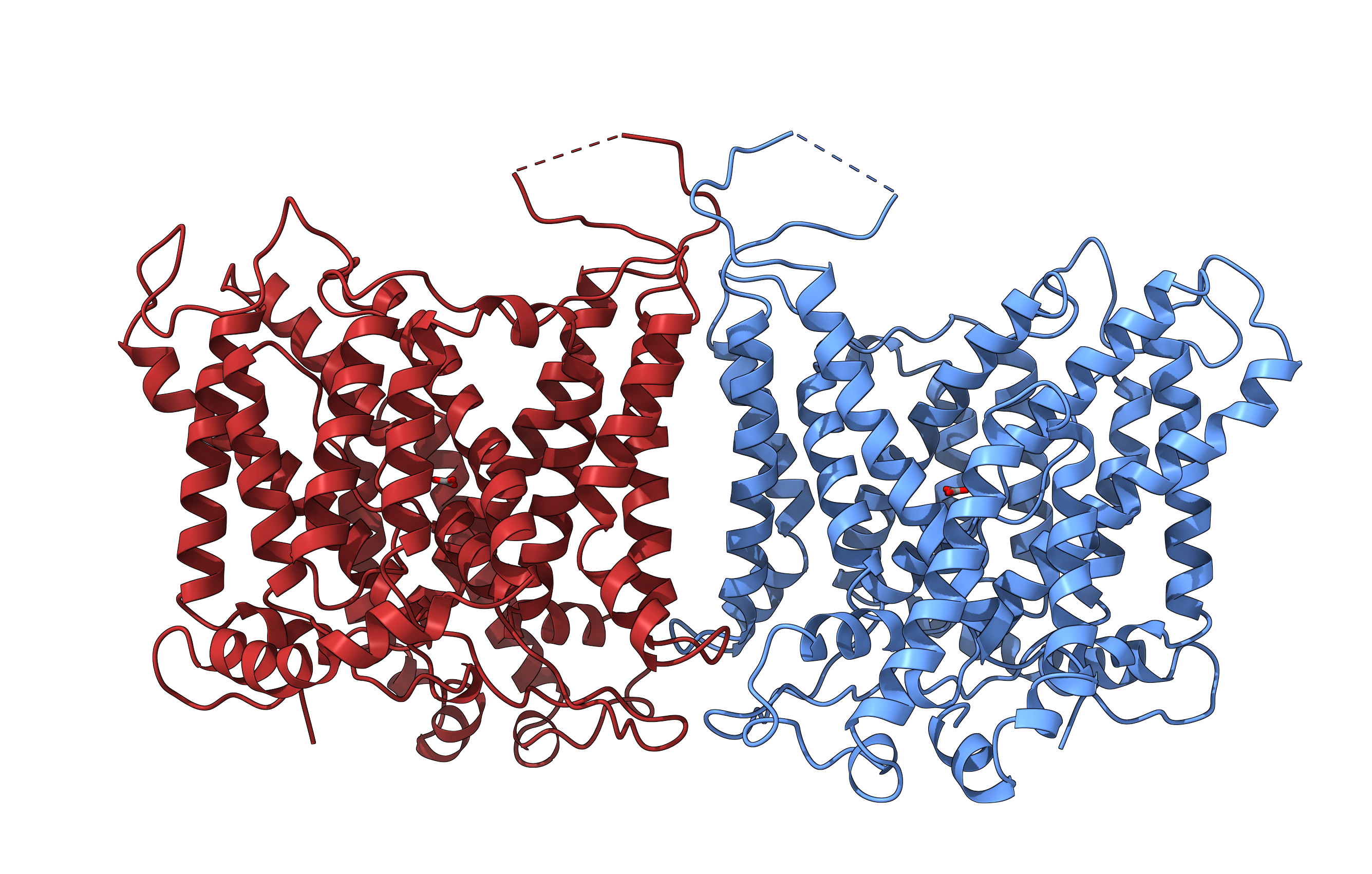

Identifiers
- Aliases: SLC4A3, AE3, SLC2C, CAE3/BAE3, solute carrier family 4 member 3
- External IDs: OMIM: 106195; MGI: 109350; GeneCards: SLC4A3

Gene location (Human)
Chr.	Chromosome 2 (human)
Band	2q35	Start	219,627,394 bp
Band	2q35	End	219,641,980 bp

Gene location (Mouse)
Chr.	Chromosome 1 (mouse)
Band	1 C4|1 39.16 cM	Start	75,522,910 bp
Band	1 C4|1 39.16 cM	End	75,538,816 bp
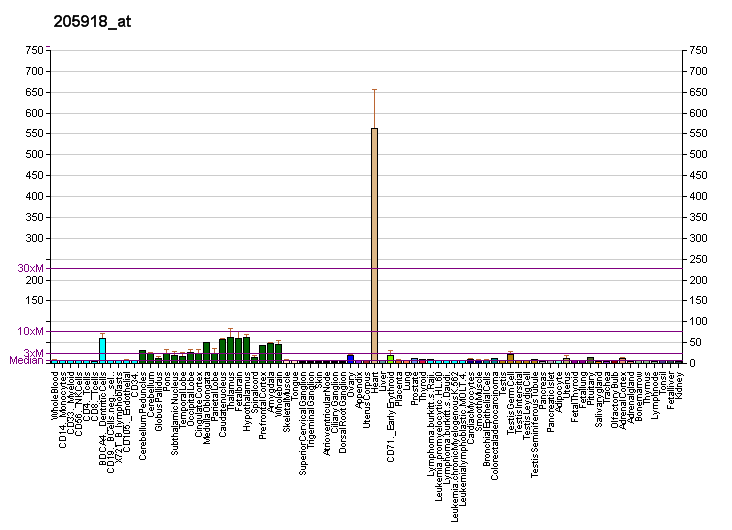
RNA expression pattern
Bgee	Human / Mouse (ortholog); Top expressed in: apex of heart; right auricle of heart; left ventricle; left ovary; right ovary; myocardium of left ventricle; right ventricle; nucleus accumbens; cardiac muscle tissue of right atrium; lateral nuclear group of thalamus / Top expressed in: perirhinal cortex; entorhinal cortex; interventricular septum; right ventricle; myocardium of ventricle; cardiac muscles; central gray substance of midbrain; CA3 field; pontine nuclei; cingulate gyrus; More reference expression data
BioGPS	More reference expression data
Gene ontology
Molecular function	antiporter activity; inorganic anion exchanger activity; anion transmembrane transporter activity; sodium:bicarbonate symporter activity
Cellular component	integral component of membrane; integral component of plasma membrane; plasma membrane; membrane
Biological process	anion transport; regulation of intracellular pH; ion transport; inorganic anion transport; bicarbonate transport; transmembrane transport; anion transmembrane transport
Sources:Amigo / QuickGO
Orthologs
Databases	NCBI: entry; OMA: entry
Species	Human	Mouse
Entrez	6508	20536
Ensembl	ENSG00000114923	ENSMUSG00000006576
UniProt	P48751	P16283
RefSeq (mRNA)	NM_005070; NM_201574; NM_001326559	NM_009208; NM_001357149; NM_001357150
RefSeq (protein)	NP_001313488; NP_005061; NP_963868	NP_033234; NP_001344078; NP_001344079
Location (UCSC)	Chr 2: 219.63 – 219.64 Mb	Chr 1: 75.52 – 75.54 Mb
PubMed search
- Wikidata
View/Edit Human	View/Edit Mouse

Anion exchange protein 3 (AE3) is a membrane transport protein encoded by the human SLC4A3 gene.

== Structure ==
Cryo-electron microscopy studies have revealed that AE3 forms a homodimeric complex, structurally similar to other members of the SLC4 family, such as AE1 and AE2. AE3 is stabilized in an outward-facing conformation under resting conditions, contrasting with AE2, which predominantly adopts an inward-facing conformation. This conformational preference renders AE3 more susceptible to inhibition by DIDS (4,4′-diisothiocyanatostilbene-2,2′-disulfonic acid), a pan-inhibitor of anion transporters. In addition to its transmembrane domain (TMD), which mediates ion exchange, the soluble N-terminal domain (NTD) of AE3 has also been structurally characterized. A chimeric construct combining the AE3 NTD with the AE2 TMD has provided further insights into domain organization and functional modulation.

== Function ==
AE3 mediates the electroneutral exchange of Cl^{−} and HCO_{3}^{–}, contributing to intracellular pH regulation and bicarbonate homeostasis. It is functionally similar to Band 3 (AE1), but exhibits distinct tissue specificity. AE3 is expressed primarily in brain neurons and cardiac tissue. Like other members of the SLC4 family, including AE2, AE3 activity is sensitive to changes in intracellular pH, which modulates its transport kinetics.

== Clinical significance ==
Mutations in the SLC4A3 gene have been associated with neurological and cardiac disorders. Animal models with targeted disruption of AE3 exhibit reduced seizure thresholds, indicating a role for AE3 in neuronal excitability and seizure susceptibility. A variant of AE3 has also been identified in patients with epilepsy, supporting its involvement in human seizure disorders. More recently, loss-of-function mutations in SLC4A3 have been linked to Short QT syndrome (SQTS), a rare cardiac channelopathy associated with a high risk of sudden cardiac death. Subsequent genetic analyses have suggested that SLC4A3 mutations may be one of the most frequent causes of SQTS, underscoring AE3’s importance in cardiac electrophysiology.

== See also ==
- Solute carrier family
