= Repolarization =

Change in membrane potential

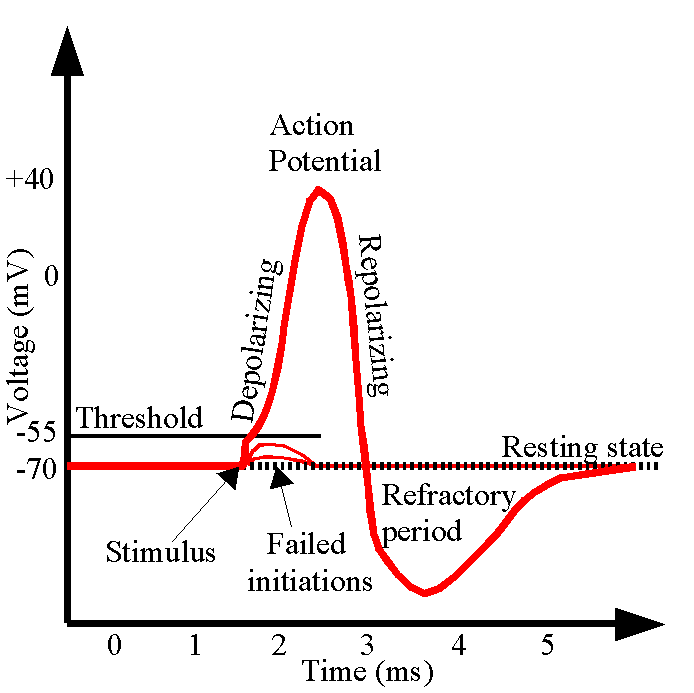
A labeled diagram of an action potential. As seen above, repolarization takes place just after the peak of the action potential, when K^{+} ions rush out of the cell.

In neuroscience, repolarization refers to the change in membrane potential that returns it to a negative value just after the depolarization phase of an action potential which has changed the membrane potential to a positive value. The repolarization phase usually returns the membrane potential back to the resting membrane potential. The efflux of potassium (K^{+}) ions results in the falling phase of an action potential. The ions pass through the selectivity filter of the K^{+} channel pore.

Repolarization typically results from the movement of positively charged K^{+} ions out of the cell. The repolarization phase of an action potential initially results in hyperpolarization, attainment of a membrane potential, termed the afterhyperpolarization, that is more negative than the resting potential. Repolarization usually takes several milliseconds.

Repolarization is a stage of an action potential in which the cell experiences a decrease of voltage due to the efflux of potassium (K^{+}) ions along its electrochemical gradient. This phase occurs after the cell reaches its highest voltage from depolarization. After repolarization, the cell hyperpolarizes as it reaches resting membrane potential (−70 mV in neuron). Sodium (Na^{+}) and potassium ions inside and outside the cell are moved by a sodium potassium pump, ensuring that electrochemical equilibrium remains unreached to allow the cell to maintain a state of resting membrane potential. In the graph of an action potential, the hyper-polarization section looks like a downward dip that goes lower than the line of resting membrane potential. In this afterhyperpolarization (the downward dip), the cell sits at more negative potential than rest (about −80 mV) due to the slow inactivation of voltage gated K^{+} delayed rectifier channels, which are the primary K^{+} channels associated with repolarization. At these low voltages, all of the voltage gated K^{+} channels close, and the cell returns to resting potential within a few milliseconds. A cell which is experiencing repolarization is said to be in its absolute refractory period. Other voltage gated K^{+} channels which contribute to repolarization include A-type channels and Ca^{2+}-activated K^{+} channels. Protein transport molecules are responsible for Na^{+} out of the cell and K^{+} into the cell to restore the original resting ion concentrations.

== Deviations from normal repolarization ==
Blockages in repolarization can arise due to modifications of the voltage-gated K^{+} channels. This is demonstrated with selectively blocking voltage gated K^{+} channels with the antagonist tetraethylammonium (TEA). By blocking the channel, repolarization is effectively stopped. Dendrotoxins are another example of a selective pharmacological blocker for voltage gated K^{+} channels. The lack of repolarization means that neuron stays at a high voltage, which slows sodium channel deactivation to a point where there is not enough inwards Na^{+} current to depolarize and sustain firing.

== Voltage gated K^{+} mechanisms ==
The structure of the voltage gated K^{+} channel is that of six transmembrane helices along the lipid bilayer. The selectivity of this channel to voltage is mediated by four of these transmembrane domains (S1–S4) – the voltage sensing domain. The other two domains (S5, S6) form the pore by which ions traverse. Activation and deactivation of the voltage gated K^{+} channel is triggered by conformational changes in the voltage sensing domain. Specifically, the S4 domain moves such that it activates and deactivates the pore. During activation, there is outward S4 motion, causing tighter VSD-pore linkage. Deactivation is characterized by inward S4 motion.

The switch from depolarization into repolarization is dependent on the kinetic mechanisms of both voltage gated K^{+} and Na^{+} channels. Although both voltage gated Na^{+} and K^{+} channels activate at roughly the same voltage (−50 mV), Na^{+} channels have faster kinetics and activate/deinactivate much more quickly. Repolarization occurs as the influx of Na^{+} decreases (channels deinactivate) and the efflux of K^{+} ions increases as its channels open. The decreased conductance of sodium ions and increased conductance of potassium ions cause the cell's membrane potential to very quickly return to, and past the resting membrane potential, which causes the hyperpolarization due to the potassium channels closing slowly, allowing more potassium to flow through after the resting membrane potential has been reached.

== Type of K^{+} channels in repolarization ==
Following the action potential, characteristically generated by the influx of Na^{+} through voltage gated Na^{+} channels, there is a period of repolarization in which the Na^{+} channels are inactivated while K^{+} channels are activated. Further study of K^{+} channels shows that there are four types which influence the repolarization of the cell membrane to re-establish the resting potential. The four types are K_{v}1, K_{v}2, K_{v}3 and K_{v}4. The K_{v}1 channel primarily influences the repolarization of the axon. The K_{v}2 channel is characteristically activated slower. The K_{v}4 channels are characteristically activated rapidly. When K_{v}2 and K_{v}4 channels are blocked, the action potential predictably widens. The K_{v}3 channels open at a more positive membrane potential and deactivate 10 times faster than the other K_{v} channels. These properties allow for the high-frequency firing that mammalian neurons require. Areas with dense K_{v}3 channels include the neocortex, basal ganglia, brain stem and hippocampus as these regions create microsecond action potentials that requires quick repolarization.

Utilizing voltage-clamp data from experiments based on rodent neurons, the K_{v}4 channels are associated with the primary repolarization conductance following the depolarization period of a neuron. When the K_{v}4 channel is blocked, the action potential becomes broader, resulting in an extended repolarization period, delaying the neuron from being able to fire again. The rate of repolarization closely regulates the amount of Ca^{2+} ions entering the cell. When large quantities of Ca^{2+} ions enter the cell due to extended repolarization periods, the neuron may die, leading to the development of stroke or seizures.

The K_{v}1 channels are found to contribute to repolarization of pyramidal neurons, likely associated with an upregulation of the K_{v}4 channels. The K_{v}2 channels were not found to contribute to repolarization rate as blocking these channels did not result in changes in neuron repolarization rates.

== Repolarization of atria cells ==
Another type of K^{+} channel that helps to mediate repolarization in the human atria is the SK channel, which are K^{+} channels which are activated by increases in Ca^{2+} concentration. "SK channel" stands for a small conductance calcium activated potassium channel, and the channels are found in the heart. SK channels specifically act in the right atrium of the heart, and have not been found to be functionally important in the ventricles of the human heart. The channels are active during repolarization as well as during the atrial diastole phase when the current undergoes hyperpolarization. Specifically, these channels are activated when Ca^{2+} binds to calmodulin (CaM) because the N-lobe of CaM interacts with the channel's S4/S5 linker to induce conformational change. When these K^{+} channels are activated, the K^{+} ions rush out of the cell during the peak of its action potential causing the cell to repolarize as the influx of Ca^{2+} ions are exceeded by K^{+} ions leaving the cell continuously.

== Ventricular repolarization ==
In the human ventricles, repolarization can be seen on an ECG (electrocardiogram) via the J-wave (Osborn), ST segment, T wave and U wave. Due to the complexity of the heart, specifically how it contains three layers of cells (endocardium, myocardium and epicardium), there are many physiological changes effecting repolarization that will also affect these waves. Apart from changes in the structure of the heart that effect repolarization, there are many pharmaceuticals that have the same effect.

On top of that, repolarization is also altered based on the location and duration of the initial action potential. In action potentials stimulated on the epicardium, it was found that the duration of the action potential needed to be 40–60 msec to give a normal, upright T-wave, whereas a duration of 20–40 msec would give an isoelectric wave and anything under 20 msec would result in a negative T-wave.

Early repolarization is a phenomenon that can be seen in ECG recordings of ventricular cells where there is an elevated ST segment, also known as a J wave. The J wave is prominent when there is a larger outward current in the epicardium compared to the endocardium. It has been historically considered to be a normal variant in cardiac rhythm but recent studies show that it is related to an increased risk of cardiac arrest. Early repolarization occurs mainly in males and is associated with a larger potassium current caused by the hormone testosterone. Additionally, although the risk is unknown, African American individuals seem more likely to have the early repolarization more often.

== Early repolarization syndrome ==
As mentioned in the previous section, early repolarization is known as appearing as elevated wave segments on ECGs. Recent studies have shown a connection between early repolarization and sudden cardiac death, which is identified as early repolarization syndrome. The condition is shown in both ventricular fibrillation without other structural heart defects as well as an early depolarization pattern, which can be seen on ECG.

The primary root of early repolarization syndrome stems from malfunctions of electrical conductance in ion channels, which may be due to genetic factors. Malfunctions of the syndrome include fluctuating sodium, potassium, and calcium currents. Changes in these currents may result in overlap of myocardial regions undergoing different phases of the action potential simultaneously, leading to risk of ventricular fibrillation and arrhythmias.

Upon being diagnosed, most individuals do not need immediate intervention, as early repolarization on an ECG does not indicate any life-threatening medical emergency. Three to thirteen percent of healthy individuals have been observed to have early repolarization on an ECG. However, patients who display early repolarization after surviving an event of early repolarization syndrome (a sudden-cardiac death experience), an implantable cardioverter-defibrillator (ICD) is strongly recommended. In addition, a patient may be more prone to atrial fibrillation if the individual has early repolarization syndrome and is under sixty years of age.

== Impaired cardiac repolarization with obstructive sleep apnea ==
Patients who suffer from obstructive sleep apnea can experience impaired cardiac repolarization, increasing the morbidity and mortality of the condition greatly. Especially at higher altitudes, patients are much more susceptible to repolarization disturbances. This can be somewhat mitigated through the use of medications such as acetazolamide, but the drugs do not provide sufficient protection. Acetazolamide and similar drugs are known to be able to improve the oxygenation and sleep apnea for patients in higher altitudes, but the benefits of the drug have been observed only when traveling at altitudes temporarily, not for people who remain at a higher altitude for a longer time.
