= T wave =

Electrocardiogram waveform representing repolarization of the heart's ventricles

Normal T wave

In electrocardiography, the T wave represents the repolarization of the ventricles. The interval from the beginning of the QRS complex to the apex of the T wave is referred to as the absolute refractory period. The last half of the T wave is referred to as the relative refractory period or vulnerable period. The T wave contains more information than the QT interval. The T wave can be described by its symmetry, skewness, slope of ascending and descending limbs, amplitude and subintervals like the T_{peak}–T_{end} interval.

In most leads, the T wave is positive. This is due to the repolarization of the membrane. During ventricle contraction (QRS complex), the heart depolarizes. Repolarization of the ventricle happens in the opposite direction of depolarization and is negative current, signifying the relaxation of the cardiac muscle of the ventricles. But this negative flow causes a positive T wave; although the cell becomes more negatively charged, the net effect is in the positive direction, and the ECG reports this as a positive spike. However, a negative T wave is normal in lead aVR. Lead V1 generally have a negative T wave. In addition, it is not uncommon to have a negative T wave in lead III, aVL, or aVF. A periodic beat-to-beat variation in the amplitude or shape of the T wave may be termed T wave alternans.

== Cardiac physiology ==
The refractory period of cardiac muscle is distinct from that of skeletal muscle. Nerves that innervate skeletal muscle have an extremely short refractory period after being subjected to an action potential (of the order of 1 ms). This can lead to sustained or tetanic contraction. In the heart, contractions must be spaced to maintain a rhythm. Unlike in muscle, repolarization occurs at a slow rate (100 ms). This prevents the heart from undergoing sustained contractions because it forces the refractory period and cardiac action potential firing to be of the same length of time.

Repolarization depends on the charges of ions and their flow across membranes. In skeletal muscle cells, repolarization is simple. First, sodium ions flow into the cell to depolarize it and cause skeletal muscle contraction. Once the action potential is over, potassium ions flow out of the cell due to increased cell membrane permeability to those ions. This high permeability contributes to the rapid repolarization of the membrane potential. This repolarization occurs quickly enough that another action potential can cause depolarization before the last action potential has dissipated. Cardiac muscle differs in that there are more calcium channels that counteract the potassium channels. While potassium quickly flows out of the cell, calcium slowly flows into the cell. This causes the repolarization to occur more slowly, making the refractory period as long as the action potential, preventing sustained contractions.

The T wave is representative of the repolarization of the membrane. In an EKG reading, the T wave is notable because it must be present before the next depolarization. An absent or strangely shaped T wave may signify disruption in repolarization or another segment of the heartbeat.

== Normal T wave ==
Normally, T waves are upright in all leads, except aVR and V1 leads. Highest amplitude of T wave is found at V2 and V3 leads. The shape of the T wave is usually asymmetrical with a rounded peak. T wave inversions from V2 to V4 leads are frequently found and normal in children. In normal adults, T wave inversions from V2 to V3 are less commonly found but can be normal. The depth of the T wave also becomes progressively shallow from one to the next lead. The height of the T wave should not exceed 5 mm in limb leads and more than 10 mm in precordial leads.

== Abnormalities ==
Both the abnormalities of the ST segment and T wave represents the abnormalities of the ventricular repolarization or secondary to abnormalities in ventricular depolarisation.

=== Inverted T wave ===
Inverted T wave is considered abnormal if inversion is deeper than 1.0 mm. Inverted T waves found in leads other than the V1 to V4 leads is associated with increased cardiac deaths. Inverted T waves associated with cardiac signs and symptoms (chest pain and cardiac murmur) are highly suggestive of myocardial ischaemia. Other ECG changes associate with myocardial ischaemia are: ST segment depression with an upright T wave; ST segment depression with biphasic T wave or inverted T wave with negative QRS complex; T wave symmetrically inverted with a pointed apex, while the ST segment is either bowed upwards or horizontally depressed, or not deviated; and ST segment depression progressing to abnormal T wave during ischaemia free intervals. However, ST segment depression is not suggestive of ischaemic location of the heart. ST segment depression in eight or more leads, associated with ST segment elevation in aVR and V1 are associated with left main coronary artery disease or three-vessel disease (blockage of all three major branches of coronary arteries). ST segment depression most prominent from V1 to V3 is suggestive of posterior infarction. Furthermore, tall or wide QRS complex with an upright T wave is further suggestive of the posterior infarction.

Wellens' syndrome is caused by the injury or blockage of the left anterior descending artery, therefore resulting in symmetrical T wave inversions from V2 to V4 with depth more than 5 mm in 75% of the cases. Meanwhile, the remaining 25% of the cases shows biphasic T wave morphology. ST segments remains neutral in this syndrome. Those who were treated without angiography will develop anterior wall myocardial infarction in a mean period of 9 days. An episode of chest pain in Wellens' syndrome is associated with ST elevation or depression and later progressed to T wave abnormality after chest pain subsided. T wave inversion less than 5 mm may still represents myocardial ischaemia, but is less severe than Wellens' syndrome.

Hypertrophic cardiomyopathy is the thickening of the left ventricle, occasionally right ventricle. It may be associated with left ventricular outflow tract obstruction or may not be associated with it in 75% of the cases. ECG would be abnormal in 75 to 95% of the patients. Characteristic ECG changes would be large QRS complex associated with giant T wave inversion in lateral leads I, aVL, V5, and V6, together with ST segment depression in left ventricular thickening. For right ventricular thickening, T waves are inverted from V2 to V3 leads. ST and T waves changes may not be apparent in hypertrophic cardiomyopathy, but if there is presence of ST and T waves changes indicates severe hypertrophy or ventricular systolic dysfunction. According to Sokolow-Lyon criterion, the height of R wave in V5 or V6 + the height of S wave in V1 more than 35 mm would be suggestive of left ventricular hypertrophy.

Both right and left bundle branch blocks are associated with similar ST and T wave changes as in hypertrophic cardiomyopathy, but are opposite to the direction of the QRS complex.

In pulmonary embolism, T wave can be symmetrically inverted at V2 to V4 leads but sinus tachycardia is usually the more common finding. T wave inversion is only present in 19% of mild pulmonary embolism, but the T inversion can be present in 85% of the cases in severe pulmonary embolism. Besides, T inversion can also exist in leads III and aVF.

Inversion of T waves in most of the ECG leads except aVR indicates many causes most commonly myocardial ischaemia and intracranial haemorrhage. Others include: hypertrophic cardiomyopathy, Takotsubo cardiomyopathy (stress-induced cardiomyopathy), cocaine abuse, pericarditis, pulmonary embolism, and advanced or complete atrioventricular block.

==== Frequency of inverted T-waves ====
Numbers from Lepeschkin E in

	Age (ethnicity)	n	V1	V2	V3	V4	V5	V6
Children
	1 week – 1 year	210	92%	74%	27%	20%	0.5%	0%
	1–2 y	154	96%	85%	39%	10%	0.7%	0%
	2–5 y	202	98%	50%	22%	7%	1%	0%
	5–8 y	94	91%	25%	14%	5%	1%	1%
	8–16 y	90	62%	7%	2%	0%	0%	0%
Males								
	12–13 y	209	46%	7%	0%	0%	0%	0%
	13–14 y	260	35%	4.6%	0.8%	0%	0%	0%
	16–19 y (whites)	50	32%	0%	0%	0%	0%	0%
	16–19 y (blacks)	310	46%	7%	2.9%	1.3%	0%	0%
	20–30 y (whites)	285	55%	0%	0%	0%	0%	0%
	20–30 y (blacks)	295	47%	0%	0%	0%	0%	0%
Females								
	12–13 y	174	69%	11%	1.2%	0%	0%	0%
	13–14 y	154	52%	8.4%	1.4%	0%	0%	0%
	16–19 y (whites)	50	66%	0%	0%	0%	0%	0%
	16–19 y (blacks)	310	73%	9%	1.3%	0.6%	0%	0%
	20–30 y (whites)	280	55%	0%	0%	0%	0%	0%
	20–30 y (blacks)	330	55%	2.4%	1%	0%	0%	0%

=== Biphasic T wave ===
As the name suggests, Biphasic T waves move in opposite directions. The two main causes of these waves are myocardial ischemia and hypokalemia.

- Ischemic T waves rise and then fall below the cardiac resting membrane potential
- Hypokalemic T waves fall and then rise above the cardiac resting membrane potential

Wellens' Syndrome is a pattern of biphasic T waves in V2–3. It is generally present in patients with ischemic chest pain.

- Type 1: T-waves are symmetrically and deeply inverted
- Type 2: T-waves are biphasic with negative terminal deflection and positive initial deflection

=== Flattened T wave ===
T wave is considered flat when the wave varies from -1.0 mm to + 1.0 mm in height. Hypokalemia or digitalis therapy can cause flattened T wave with a prominent U wave. As hypokalemia progressively worsens, the T wave becomes more flattened while the U wave becomes more prominent, with progressively deeper ST segment depression. For digitalis toxicity, there will be a sagging QT interval, flattened T wave, and prominent U wave with a shortened QT interval.

=== Hyperacute T wave ===
These T waves may be seen in patients displaying Prinzmetal angina. Additionally, patients exhibiting the early stages of STEMI may display these broad and disproportional waves.

=== 'Camel hump' T wave ===
The name of these T waves suggests the shape it exhibits (double peaks). Since these T wave abnormalities may arise from different events, i.e. hypothermia and severe brain damage, they have been deemed as nonspecific, making them much more difficult to interpret.

=== Peaked T wave ===
High blood potassium levels (hyperkalemia) can cause "peaked t-waves."

== See also ==
- Electrocardiography (ECG)
- Cardiac action potential
- QRS Complex
- P wave
- Cardiac pacemaker
